= National Register of Historic Places listings in Fauquier County, Virginia =

Location of Fauquier County in Virginia

This is a list of the National Register of Historic Places listings in Fauquier County, Virginia.

This is intended to be a complete list of the properties and districts on the National Register of Historic Places in Fauquier County, Virginia, United States. The locations of National Register properties and districts for which the latitude and longitude coordinates are included below, may be seen in an online map.

There are 72 properties and districts listed on the National Register in the county, including 1 National Historic Landmark.

This National Park Service list is complete through NPS recent listings posted September 18, 2026.

== Current listings ==
	Name on the Register	Image	Date listed	Location	City or town	Description
1	Ashleigh	Ashleigh	August 14, 1973 (#73002012)	South of Delaplane, off U.S. Route 17; 38°54′08″N 77°55′07″W	Delaplane	
2	Ashville Historic District	Ashville Historic District	February 11, 2004 (#04000043)	4236-4130 Ashville Rd. and part of Old Ashville Rd. 38°51′54″N 77°55′21″W	Marshall	
3	Atoka Historic District	Atoka Historic District	November 27, 2004 (#04001266)	1461, 1466, 1468, and 1481 Atoka Rd. and 7258 and 7260 Rectors Ln. 38°58′30″N 77°48′33″W	Atoka	
4	Auburn Battlefield	Auburn Battlefield	December 5, 2011 (#11000873)	Bounded by Casanova, Auburn Baptist Church, and Catlett; 38°42′09″N 77°42′06″W	Catlett	part of the Civil War in Virginia Multiple Property Submission (MPS)
5	Belle Grove	Belle Grove	August 30, 2006 (#06000756)	1402 Winchester Rd. 38°58′46″N 77°57′16″W	Delaplane	
6	Beverley Mill	Beverley Mill	February 23, 1972 (#72001411)	Junction of State Route 55 and Beverleys Mill Rd. 38°49′28″N 77°42′38″W	The Plains	
7	Blue Ridge Farm	Blue Ridge Farm	August 30, 2006 (#06000753)	1799 Blue Ridge Farm Rd. 38°57′28″N 77°52′43″W	Upperville	
8	Brentmoor	Brentmoor	January 20, 1978 (#78003016)	173 Main St. 38°42′42″N 77°47′26″W	Warrenton	
9	Bristersburg Historic District	Bristersburg Historic District	May 21, 2009 (#09000336)	Parts of Elk Run and Bristersburg Rds. 38°35′01″N 77°36′47″W	Bristersburg	
10	Broad Run-Little Georgetown Rural Historic District	Broad Run-Little Georgetown Rural Historic District	April 21, 2016 (#16000205)	Roughly bounded by The Plains, the Bull Run Mountains, State Route 55, Bust Head Rd., and Hopewell Rd. 38°49′29″N 77°43′53″W	Broad Run	Extends into Prince William County
11	Burrland Farm Historic District	Burrland Farm Historic District	November 7, 1997 (#97001406)	Burrland Ln. 38°57′08″N 77°45′05″W	Middleburg	
12	Calverton Historic District	Calverton Historic District	August 12, 2010 (#10000542)	Parts of Bristersburg and Catlett Rds. 38°38′07″N 77°40′25″W	Calverton	
13	Carters Run Rural Historic District	Carters Run Rural Historic District	May 15, 2014 (#14000236)	Generally centered along Carters Run, Scotts Rd., and the eastern side of Free State Rd. 38°49′50″N 77°51′24″W	Marshall	
14	Casanova Historic District	Casanova Historic District	November 16, 2005 (#05001264)	Parts of Casanova Rd., Rogues Rd., and Weston Rd. 38°39′28″N 77°43′02″W	Casanova	
15	Catlett Historic District	Catlett Historic District	February 21, 2008 (#08000069)	Prospect Ave. and parts of Gaskins Ln. and Tenerife, Elk Run, Old Catlett, Catlett, Old Dumfries, and Catlett School Rds. 38°39′16″N 77°38′27″W	Catlett	
16	Cromwell's Run Rural Historic District	Cromwell's Run Rural Historic District	September 19, 2008 (#08000907)	Along Atoka Rd., roughly bounded on the west by Goose Creek, on the north by U.S. Route 50, and on the east by Cromwell's Run; also bounded by the Fauquier County line on the north and the existing Cromwell's Run Rural Historic District on the east 38°56′35″N 77°49′20″W	Rectortown	Second set of boundaries represents a boundary increase of November 12, 2008
17	Crooked Run Valley Rural Historic District	Crooked Run Valley Rural Historic District	May 27, 2004 (#04000550)	Roughly bounded by the Fauquier County line, Interstate 66, Delaplane Grade Rd., Naked Mountain, and State Route 55; 38°55′50″N 77°57′24″W	Paris	
18	Dakota	Dakota	July 27, 2005 (#05000768)	8134 Springs Rd. 38°42′12″N 77°48′25″W	Warrenton	
19	Deerfield	Deerfield	January 14, 2019 (#100003309)	9009 John S. Mosby Highway; 38°59′20″N 77°52′36″W	Upperville	
20	Delaplane Historic District	Delaplane Historic District	February 11, 2004 (#04000050)	Parts of Delaplane Grade Rd. and Rokeby Rd. 38°54′56″N 77°55′12″W	Delaplane	
21	Galemont	Galemont	September 25, 2012 (#12000824)	5071 Galemont Ln. 38°50′00″N 77°44′05″W	Broad Run	
22	Germantown Archeological Sites		September 16, 1982 (#82004555)	Southeast of Rogues Rd. 38°36′49″N 77°43′13″W	Midland	
23	Green Pastures	Green Pastures	May 29, 2002 (#02000596)	2337 Zulla Rd. 38°56′30″N 77°46′26″W	Middleburg	
24	Heflin's Store	Heflin's Store	February 11, 2004 (#04000046)	5310 Blantyre Rd. 38°49′28″N 77°43′55″W	Little Georgetown	
25	The Hollow	The Hollow	January 16, 2004 (#03001442)	Leeds Manor Rd. and north of Marshall School Ln. 38°54′34″N 77°59′38″W	Markham	Boyhood home of John Marshall, Chief Justice of the United States 1801-1835
26	Hopefield	Hopefield	March 10, 2009 (#09000120)	6763 Airlie Rd. 38°44′51″N 77°47′31″W	Warrenton	
27	Hume Historic District	Hume Historic District	February 21, 2008 (#08000070)	Hume and Leeds Manor Rds. 38°49′51″N 77°59′56″W	Hume	
28	Little River Rural Historic District	Little River Rural Historic District	February 14, 2014 (#14000011)	Roughly bounded by U.S. Route 50, Bull Run Mountain Rd., and Landmark School Rd. 38°54′57″N 77°44′39″W	The Plains	
29	Loretta	Loretta	December 23, 1993 (#93001442)	Eastern side of U.S. Route 17, 3,500 feet (1,100 m) north of the Warrenton town limits 38°44′53″N 77°48′32″W	Warrenton	
30	Markham Historic District	Markham Historic District	November 17, 2005 (#05001261)	Parts of E. State Route 55, Farm House Rd., Leeds Manor Rd., Old Markham Rd., Poverty Hollow Lane, Rail Stop Rd., and Stone Church Rd. 38°54′18″N 77°59′40″W	Markham	
31	Marshall Historic District	Marshall Historic District	March 19, 2007 (#07000191)	Including parts of Anderson Ave., Emerald Ln., Frost St., Main St., Rosstown Rd., Wild Aster Ct., and Winchester Rd. 38°51′59″N 77°51′17″W	Marshall	
32	John Marshall's Leeds Manor Rural Historic District	John Marshall's Leeds Manor Rural Historic District	November 1, 2007 (#07001138)	Centered along Leeds Manor Rd. from Leeds Church to Raven Ln. 38°54′38″N 77°59′26″W	Markham	
33	Melrose	Melrose	February 10, 1983 (#83003281)	North of Casanova on Rogues Rd. 38°40′25″N 77°42′33″W	Casanova	
34	Midland Historic District	Midland Historic District	January 31, 2019 (#100003392)	Includes parts of Rogues, Midland, Catlett, Dowell, Germantown, and Old Carolina Rds., and Linden, Chestnut, and 2nd Sts. 38°35′53″N 77°43′27″W	Midland	
35	Mill House	Mill House	January 12, 1984 (#84003527)	U.S. Route 50; 38°58′10″N 77°47′29″W	Middleburg	
36	Gen. William Mitchell House	Gen. William Mitchell House	December 8, 1976 (#76002112)	0.5 miles (0.8 km) south of Middleburg on The Plains Rd. 38°57′44″N 77°44′36″W	Middleburg	
37	Monterosa	Monterosa	January 25, 1991 (#90002193)	343 Culpeper St. 38°42′27″N 77°48′01″W	Warrenton	
38	Morgantown Historic District	Morgantown Historic District	February 11, 2004 (#04000045)	Roughly surrounding the junction of Freestate Rd. and Mount Nebo Church Rd., as well as a discontiguous cemetery located approximately 0.2 miles (0.32 km) to the southeast at the end of Mount Nebo Church Rd. 38°50′29″N 77°52′47″W	Marshall	
39	Morven	Morven	May 30, 2002 (#02000597)	3918 Leeds Manor Rd. 38°52′21″N 77°59′51″W	Markham	
40	Mount Hope	Mount Hope	February 1, 2006 (#05001625)	6015 Georgetown Rd. 38°47′30″N 77°44′02″W	New Baltimore	
41	Mt. Bleak-Skye Farm (030-0283)	Mt. Bleak-Skye Farm (030-0283)	May 24, 2004 (#04000552)	11012 Edmonds Ln. 38°59′28″N 77°57′57″W	Delaplane	
42	New Baltimore Historic District	New Baltimore Historic District	February 11, 2004 (#04000044)	Parts of Old Alexandria Turnpike, Mason Ln., Georgetown Rd., and Beverley's Mill Rd. 38°46′01″N 77°43′36″W	New Baltimore	
43	North Wales	North Wales	June 29, 1999 (#99000726)	7392 Ironwood Ln. 38°40′24″N 77°49′16″W	Warrenton	
44	Number 18 School in Marshall	Number 18 School in Marshall	November 7, 1997 (#97001405)	Junction of State Route 55 and Whiting Rd. 38°52′11″N 77°49′54″W	Marshall	
45	Oak Hill	Oak Hill	June 18, 1973 (#73002013)	2.2 miles (3.5 km) south of Delaplane; 38°53′16″N 77°54′03″W	Delaplane	
46	Oakley	Oakley	February 24, 1983 (#83003282)	East of Upperville on U.S. Route 50; 38°58′36″N 77°51′55″W	Upperville	
47	The Oaks	The Oaks	May 30, 2002 (#02000585)	8457 Oaks Rd. 38°41′08″N 77°50′32″W	Warrenton	
48	Oakwood	Oakwood	February 2, 2016 (#15001038)	7433 Oakwood Dr. 38°43′38″N 77°50′59″W	Warrenton	
49	Old Denton	Old Denton	March 12, 2012 (#12000123)	7064 Young Rd. 38°54′55″N 77°47′45″W	The Plains	
50	Old Fauquier County Jail	Old Fauquier County Jail	January 20, 1978 (#78003015)	Fauquier County Courthouse Sq. 38°42′49″N 77°47′46″W	Warrenton	
51	Orlean Historic District	Orlean Historic District	August 14, 2009 (#09000615)	Parts of John Barnton Payne and Leeds Manor Rds. 38°45′10″N 77°57′50″W	Orlean	
52	Paradise	Paradise	April 11, 2014 (#14000147)	158 Winchester St. 38°43′02″N 77°47′57″W	Warrenton	
53	Paris Historic District	Paris Historic District	March 21, 2007 (#07000192)	Federal St. and parts of Republican St. and Gap Run Rd. 39°00′17″N 77°57′06″W	Paris	
54	The Plains Historic District	The Plains Historic District	May 21, 2014 (#14000232)	Parts of Main, Mosby, Lee, Bragg, Stuart, Jackson, Pickett, and Broad Sts., Fauquier and Loudoun Aves., and Hopewell Rd. 38°51′44″N 77°46′27″W	The Plains	
55	Rectortown Historic District	Rectortown Historic District	November 27, 2004 (#04001267)	Roughly bounded by Maidstone, Rectortown, Atoka, Lost Corner, and Crenshaw Rds. 38°55′12″N 77°51′38″W	Rectortown	
56	Remington Historic District	Remington Historic District	May 5, 2005 (#05000395)	Parts of E. and W. Bowen St., N. Church St., N. Franklin St., N. John Stone St., E. and W. Main St., S. Mill St., Sumerduck Rd., Tinpot Run Lane, and E. and W. Washington St. 38°32′06″N 77°48′26″W	Remington	
57	St. James Baptist Church and Cemetery		November 22, 2021 (#100007186)	7353 Botha Rd. 38°35′24″N 77°48′37″W	Bealeton	
58	Saunders House		July 16, 2026 (#100013214)	310 Waterloo Street; 38°43′01″N 77°48′19″W	Warrenton	
59	Silver Hill Baptist Church and School		December 15, 2022 (#100008482)	13323 Silver Hill Rd. 38°28′57″N 77°41′45″W	Bealeton	
60	Sumerduck Historic District	Sumerduck Historic District	May 21, 2009 (#09000337)	Parts of Sumerduck Rd. 38°27′37″N 77°43′39″W	Sumerduck	
61	Thoroughfare Gap Battlefield	Thoroughfare Gap Battlefield	November 18, 1999 (#99001374)	Junction of Interstate 66 and State Route 55; 38°49′26″N 77°42′52″W	Broad Run	Extends into Prince William County
62	Unison Battlefield Historic District	Unison Battlefield Historic District	November 22, 2011 (#11000835)	Parts of Quaker Ln. and Jeb Stuart, Unison, Newlin Mill, Millville, Bloomfield, Welbourne, and Greengarden Rds. 39°02′12″N 77°47′15″W	Unison	
63	Upperville Colt and Horse Show Grounds		April 1, 2022 (#100007572)	8301 John S. Mosby Hwy. 38°59′17″N 77°51′15″W	Upperville vicinity	
64	Upperville Historic District	Upperville Historic District	October 18, 1972 (#72001394)	Including the entire village extending approximately 1 mile (1.6 km) along U.S. Route 50; 38°59′39″N 77°53′03″W	Upperville	
65	Vint Hill Farms Station Historic District		November 8, 2021 (#100007135)	Aiken Dr., Kennedy Rd., Vint Hill Pkwy., Farm Station Rd., Bludau Dr., Sigler Rd. 38°44′39″N 77°40′54″W	Warrenton	
66	Warrenton Historic District	Warrenton Historic District	October 13, 1983 (#83004243)	Roughly Main, Waterloo, Alexandria, Winchester, Culpeper, High, Falmouth, Lee, and Horner Sts.; also Alexandria Pike, Chestnut St., Cul~per St., East St.. Falmouth St.. Franklin St., Green St., John Marshall St., Keith St., Lee St., Pelham St., Washington St.. 38°42′40″N 77°47′35″W	Warrenton	A boundary increase was approved August 27, 2024.
67	Waveland	Waveland	August 20, 2004 (#04000888)	Carter's Run Rd. 38°49′50″N 77°51′24″W	Marshall	
68	Waverly	Waverly	March 26, 1979 (#79003040)	South of Middleburg on Halfway Rd. 38°55′51″N 77°44′39″W	Middleburg	
69	Weston	Weston	December 6, 1996 (#96001447)	4477 Weston Rd. 38°39′48″N 77°41′57″W	Casanova	
70	Woodside	Woodside	August 12, 2009 (#09000616)	9525 Maidstone Rd. 38°54′13″N 77°54′06″W	Delaplane	
71	Yew Hill-Robert Ashby's Tavern-Shacklett's Tavern	Yew Hill-Robert Ashby's Tavern-Shacklett's Tavern	January 20, 2005 (#04001535)	10030 State Route 55; 38°54′26″N 77°55′11″W	Delaplane	
72	Yorkshire House	Yorkshire House	June 1, 2005 (#05000522)	405 Winchester St. 38°43′23″N 77°47′57″W	Warrenton	

== See also ==
- List of National Historic Landmarks in Virginia
- National Register of Historic Places listings in Virginia
