= Little River Rural Historic District =

Historic district in Virginia, United States

- U.S. National Register of Historic Places
- U.S. Historic district
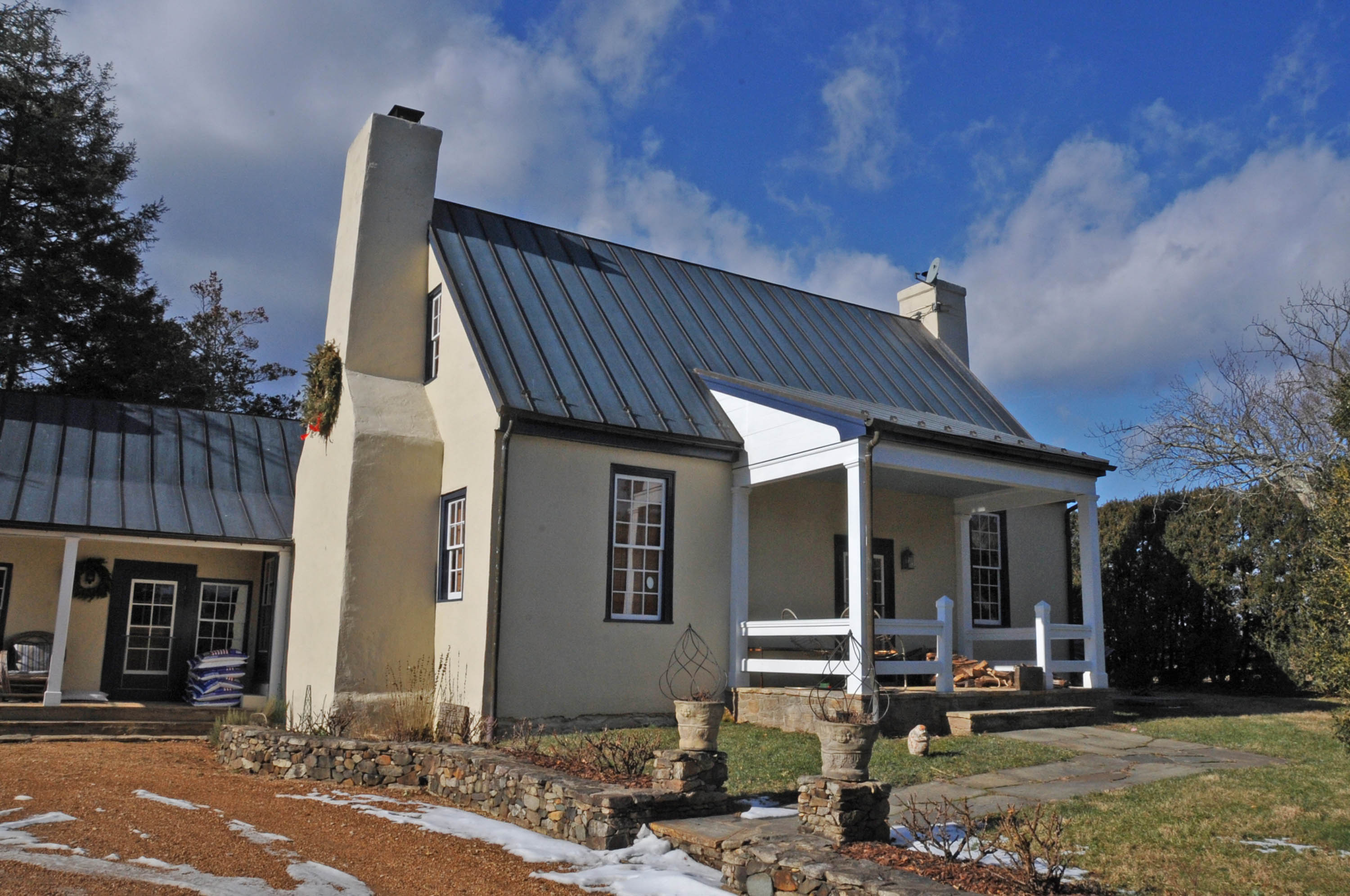
- Chinn house c. 1770

- Location within Northern Virginia Location within Virginia Location within the United States
- Location: The Plains, Virginia
- Coordinates: 38°58′20″N 77°42′10″W
- Area: 23,116 acres (9,355 ha)
- Built: 1736
- NRHP reference No.: 14000011
- Added to NRHP: February 14, 2014

The Little River Rural Historic District encompasses a large rural landscape in northeastern Fauquier County. Covering some 23,000 acres (9,300 ha), the district extends from near The Plains in the south to near Middleburg in the north. On the east it is bounded by the Bull Run Mountains, and on the west by Cromwell's Run. The area's landscape typifies the characteristics of the Piedmont region of Virginia, and is devoid of high-density residential, commercial, or industrial activity. Land use is largely devoted to agricultural, equestrian, and hunting pursuits. There are a few places where mills historically operated, and there are three small village centers in the district. A portion of the Middleburg battlefield lies in the northern part of the district, and the district encompasses several previously listed areas, including the Burrland Farm Historic District, the Gen. William Mitchell House (a National Historic Landmark), the Waverly house, Old Denton, and Green Pastures.

The district was listed on the National Register of Historic Places in 2014.

== See also ==
- National Register of Historic Places listings in Fauquier County, Virginia
