= Hopefield =

Hopefield can refer to:

- Hopefield, New South Wales in Australia
- Hopefield, Western Cape, in South Africa
- Hopefield, Bonnyrigg, in Scotland
- Hopefield, Caithness, in Scotland
- Hopefield, Arkansas, a former town in West Memphis, USA
- Hopefield (Warrenton, Virginia), listed on the NRHP in Fauquier County, Virginia
- Hope Field Aerodrome, near Ottawa, Canada

== See also ==
- Hopfield (disambiguation)
