= Peyton House (Raymond, Mississippi) =

Historic house in Mississippi, United States

- U.S. National Register of Historic Places
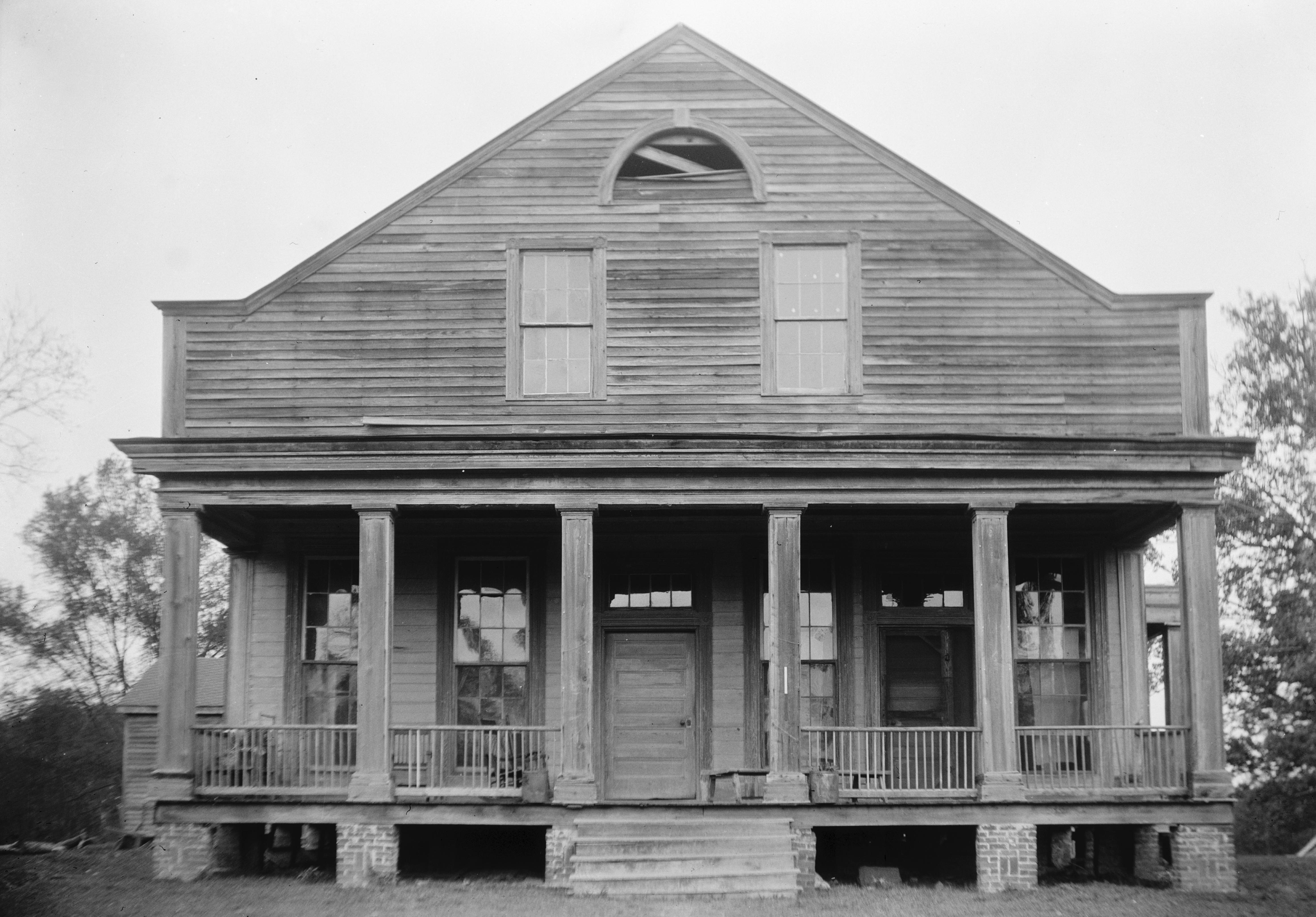
- 1936 HABS photo

- Location within Mississippi Location within the United States
- Nearest city: Raymond, Mississippi
- Coordinates: 32°16′1″N 90°25′12″W
- Built: 1831-34
- Built by: John B. Peyton
- NRHP reference No.: 73001016
- Added to NRHP: October 3, 1973

Peyton House, also known as Waverly, in Raymond, Mississippi, in central Hinds County, was built during 1831–34. It was listed on the National Register of Historic Places in 1973.

The house was built by, and is significant for its association with, John B. Peyton (1797-1868), an early surveyor and settler of central Mississippi. Peyton was born in Fauquier County, Virginia in 1797 and came to Natchez, Mississippi in 1819. He worked as a surveyor for many years. He was elected major of the Mississippi Militia's 18th Regiment in 1827. He was elected to the Mississippi legislature in 1828. According to the NRHP nomination for the property,

In 1829, Peyton cast the deciding vote that kept the state capital from being moved to the town of Clinton and was challenged to a duel by Judge Isaac Caldwellof that community. Peyton, having the choice of weapons, selected rifles. No real damage resulted in the exchange of fire, but Caldwell was grazed by the ball from Peyton's rifle.

The house is a one-and-a-half-story gable-front house with dormers and elaborate woodwork, built on brick piers. The gable end included a partial Palladian window, which had side windows and a rounded top window, but lacked an opening where the central window would go. The house was also unusual for having a lower-level room. The house's style is an adaptation of a Virginia style of home (or perhaps a specific Virginia house, presumably Waverly, house built in 1790 in Fauquier County, Virginia), modified to allow more ventilation needed in the Mississippi climate. The house has been modified somewhat from its historic form, including by adding a central window in the gable.

The property's livestock was seized by the Union Army after the 1863 Battle of Raymond, a significant battle in the Vicksburg Campaign. An order of Major General Ulysses S. Grant released the livestock, perhaps due to Peyton "being a strong Union man".

Peyton died in 1868 at the home, aged 70 or 71. He was known as the father of the town of Raymond and was its oldest citizen when he died.

The house was documented by the Historic American Buildings Survey (HABS) in 1936. According to the HABS report, the house was located on the Natchez Trace.
