= Broad Run–Little Georgetown Rural Historic District =

Historic district in Virginia, United States

- U.S. National Register of Historic Places
- U.S. Historic district
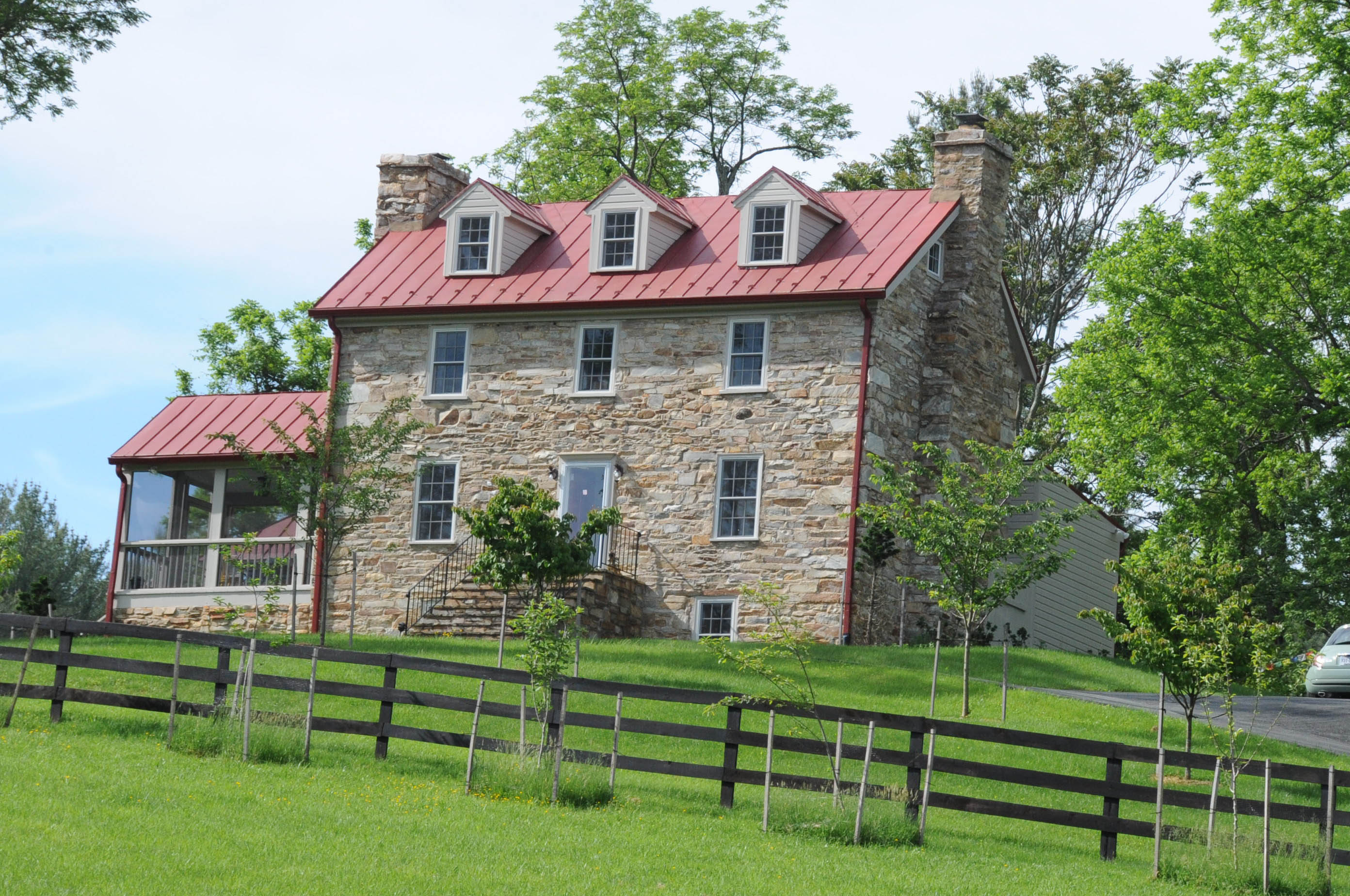
- Contributing building

- Location within Northern Virginia Location within Virginia Location within the United States
- Location: Roughly bounded by The Plains, Bull Run Mountains, John Marshall Hwy., Bust Head Rd., and Hopewell Rd., near Broad Run, Virginia
- Coordinates: 38°51′4″N 77°44′17″W
- Area: 9,500 acres (3,800 ha)
- NRHP reference No.: 16000205
- Added to NRHP: April 21, 2016

The Broad Run–Little Georgetown Rural Historic District encompasses a large rural landscape in northeastern Fauquier County, Virginia, and a small portion of neighboring Prince William County, Virginia. The district covers about 9,500 acres (3,800 ha) of rolling hills, that has an agricultural history dating to the 18th century. It is roughly divided by the John Marshall Highway (Virginia State Route 55), and is bounded on the west by The Plains, the east by the Bull Run Mountains, and the south by Pignut Mountain.

The district was listed on the National Register of Historic Places in 2016. It includes two individually listed properties: Heflin's Store, and the Beverley Mill.

== Gallery ==
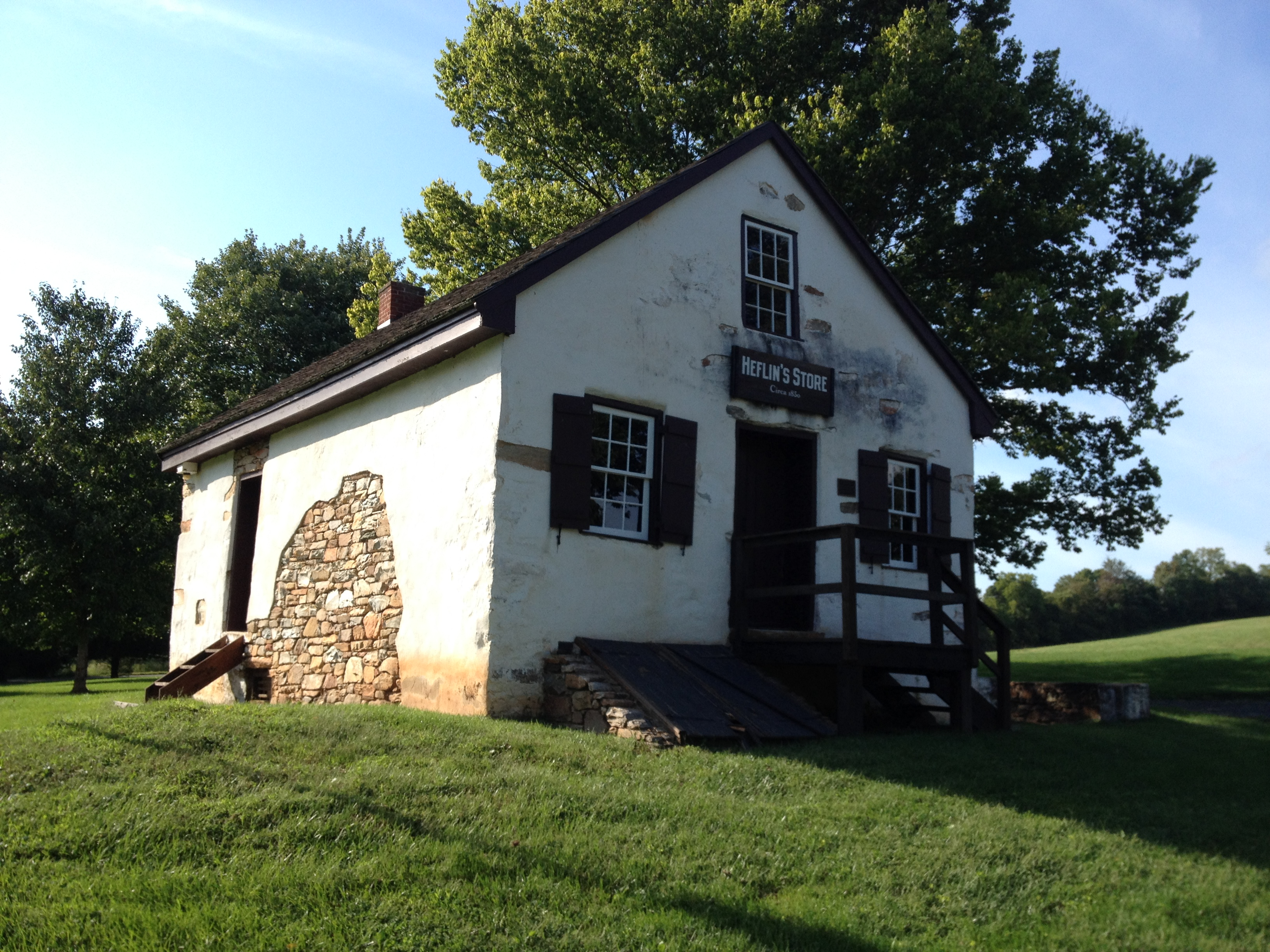
Heflin's Store

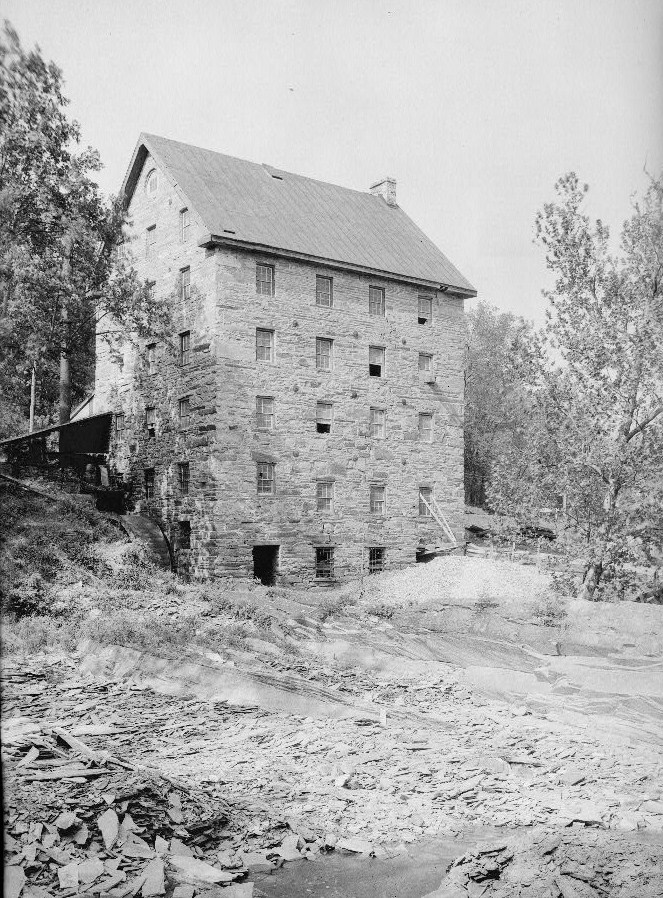
Beverley's Mill

== See also ==
- National Register of Historic Places listings in Fauquier County, Virginia
- National Register of Historic Places listings in Prince William County, Virginia
