= Oakwood (Fauquier County, Virginia) =

Historic house in Virginia, United States

- U.S. National Register of Historic Places
- Virginia Landmarks Register
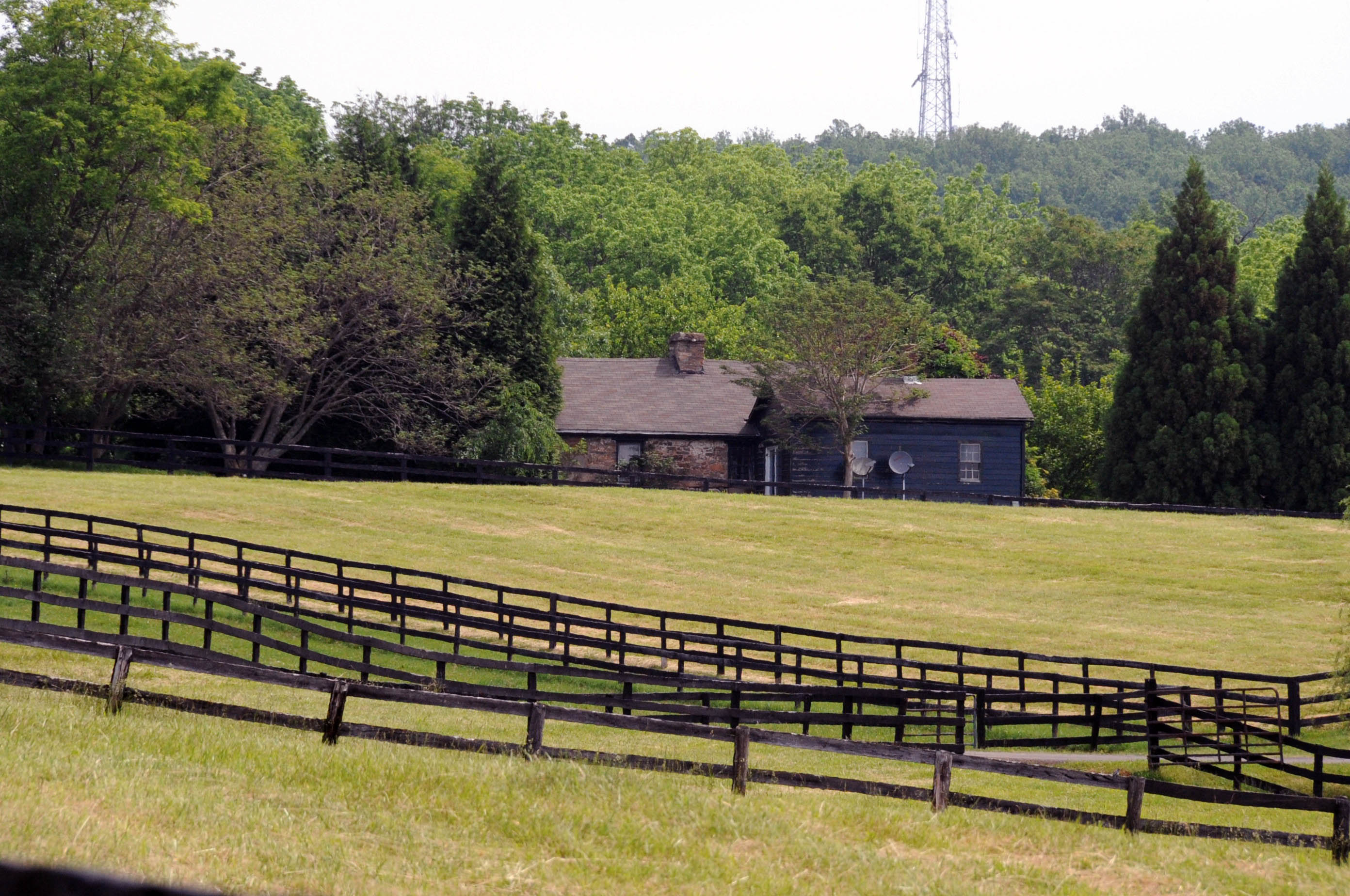

- Location within Northern Virginia Location within Virginia Location within the United States
- Location: 7433 Oakwood Dr., near Warrenton, Virginia
- Coordinates: 38°43′34″N 77°51′3″W
- Area: 600.6 acres (243.1 ha)
- Built: 1785
- Architectural style: Greek Revival; Colonial Revival
- NRHP reference No.: 15001038
- VLR No.: 030-0083

Significant dates
- Added to NRHP: February 2, 2016
- Designated VLR: December 10, 2015

Oakwood is a historic farm property west of Warrenton in rural Fauquier County, Virginia. It is bounded on the south by Old Waterloo Road, and on the west by Great Run, a south-flowing tributary of the Rappahannock River. The main house is a rambling two-story masonry building, whose oldest portions date to the 18th century. Its present appearance has significant Greek Revival features, include a gabled temple-front portico added about 1838. The property is also notable in local culture for hosting the very first Virginia Gold Cup race in 1922.

The property was listed on the National Register of Historic Places in 2016.

== See also ==
- National Register of Historic Places listings in Fauquier County, Virginia
