= Heflin's Store =

Historic commercial building in Virginia, United States

- U.S. National Register of Historic Places
- U.S. Historic district – Contributing property
- Virginia Landmarks Register
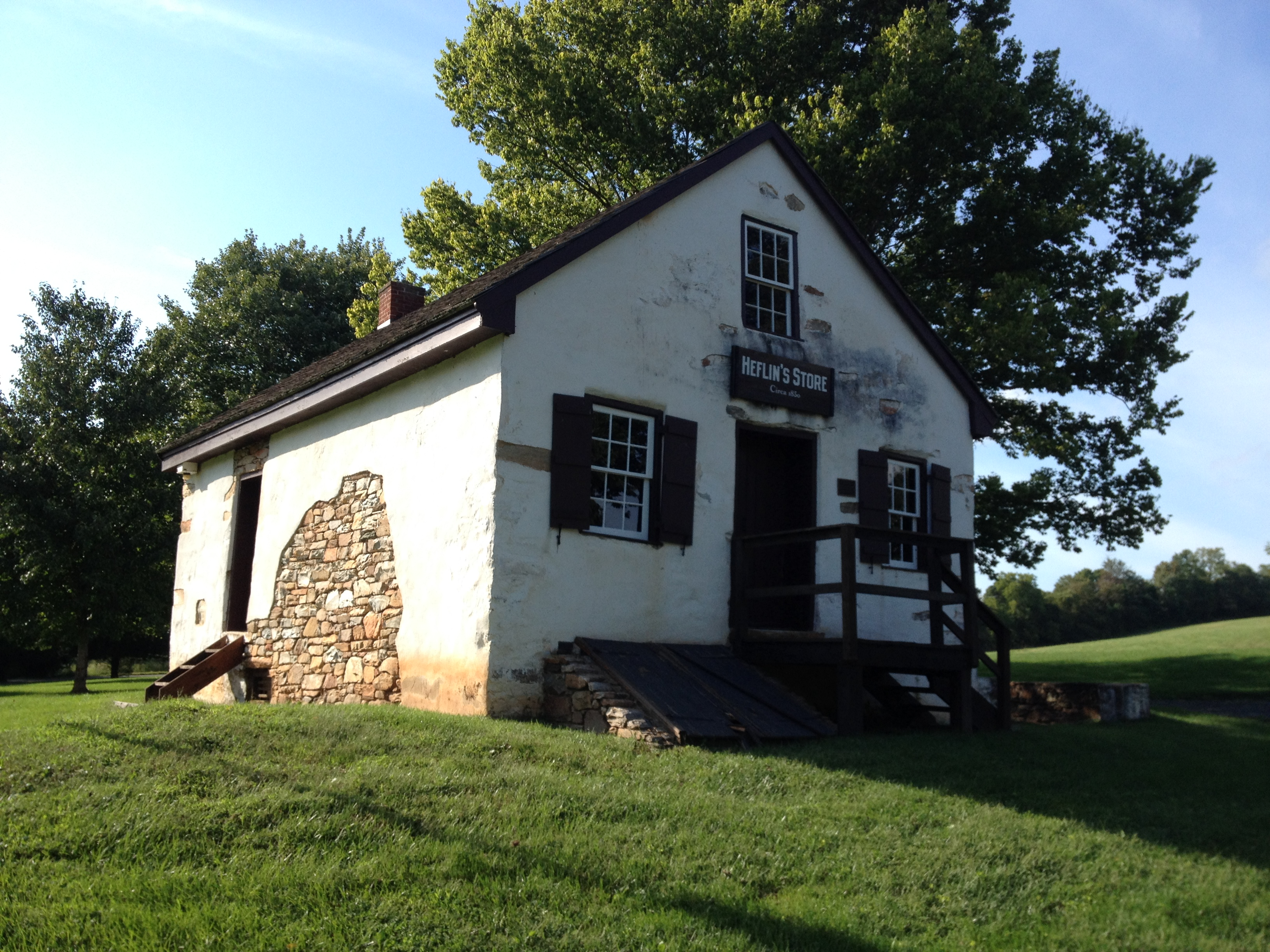

- Location within Northern Virginia Location within Virginia Location within the United States
- Location: 5310 Blantyre Rd., near Little Georgetown, Virginia
- Coordinates: 38°49′33″N 77°43′56″W
- Area: 1.4 acres (0.57 ha)
- Built: 1845
- Built by: Fry, John M., Stonemason
- Part of: Broad Run-Little Georgetown Rural Historic District (ID16000205)
- NRHP reference No.: 04000046
- VLR No.: 030-0520

Significant dates
- Added to NRHP: February 11, 2004
- Designated CP: April 21, 2016
- Designated VLR: December 3, 2003

Heflin's Store, also known as Stover's Store and Brawner's Store, is a historic general store located near Little Georgetown, Fauquier County, Virginia. It was built in 1845, and is a 1 1/2-story, three-bay, stuccoed rubble stone structure. It has a front gable roof. The building housed a general store from the time of its construction into the 1970s.

It was listed on the National Register of Historic Places in 2004.

== See also ==
- National Register of Historic Places listings in Fauquier County, Virginia
