= Yew Hill-Robert Ashby's Tavern-Shacklett's Tavern =

Historic commercial building in Virginia, United States

- U.S. National Register of Historic Places
- Virginia Landmarks Register
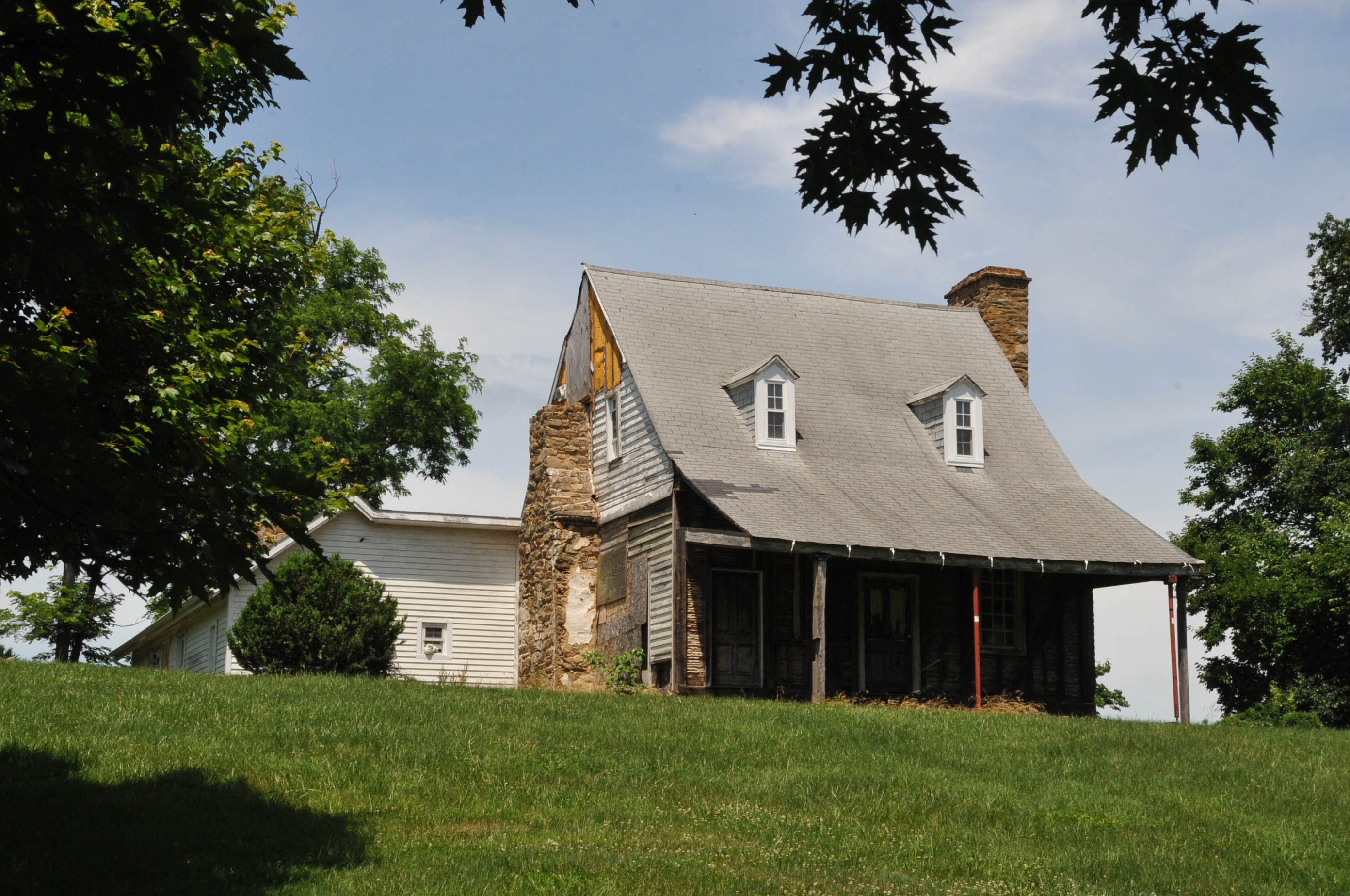

- Location within Northern Virginia Location within Virginia Location within the United States
- Location: 10030 John Marshall Hwy., near Delaplane, Virginia
- Coordinates: 38°54′14″N 77°55′28″W
- Area: 98 acres (40 ha)
- Built: 1760-1761
- Architectural style: Colonial, Double-pile
- NRHP reference No.: 04001535
- VLR No.: 030-0060

Significant dates
- Added to NRHP: January 20, 2005
- Designated VLR: December 1, 2004

Yew Hill-Robert Ashby's Tavern-Shacklett's Tavern, known before 1760 as "Watts" or "Watts Ordinary", is a historic inn and tavern located near Delaplane, Fauquier County, Virginia. The main house was built about 1760–1761, and is a 1 1/2-story, three-bay, Colonial-era frame structure. It sits on a stone foundation and features a jerkin-head gable roof. Also on the property are the contributing meat house, built about 1760–1817; barn (1798–1799, 1857); and spring house ruin (c. 1800). The building housed an ordinary from the time of its construction until 1879.

It was listed on the National Register of Historic Places in 2005.
