= Hume, Virginia =

Unincorporated community in Virginia, United States

- Unincorporated community
- Location within the Commonwealth of Virginia Hume (Virginia) Hume (the United States)
- Coordinates: 38°49′55″N 77°59′58″W
- Country: United States
- State: Virginia
- County: Fauquier
- Time zone: UTC−5 (Eastern (EST))
  - Summer (DST): UTC−4 (EDT)
- ZIP codes: 22639

Hume is a small unincorporated village in Fauquier County, Virginia, United States. Hume is five miles south of Interstate 66's Exit 18 and is named after the local Hume family. It runs along Virginia State Route 688 and is located east of the Rappahannock County line. The community has a post office and ZIP Code of 22639, and is home to a local winery.

== History ==
Hume was known as Barbee's Crossroads in the mid 19th century, after Joseph Barbee who leased the land from Denny Fairfax in 1787. The village was at the north end of the Leeds Manor Turnpike which was incorporated in 1848. The village's center is at the corner of Leeds of Manor Road (Route 688) and Hume Road (Route 635), formerly known as the "Crossroads".

At one time, the village had three stores and four blacksmiths, a fourth store existed later. The large cattle farms in the surrounding areas employed many families. During the American Civil War, wounded from the First and Second Battles of Bull Run were taken to Barbee's Crossroads. The Leed's Church (Episcopal) was occupied at different times by both Union and Confederate soldiers. As a result of nearby fighting, the church walls were pierced by a shell which exploded within the church, damaging the interior. In 1873, the church burned and was rebuilt.

== Famous buildings ==
Barbee's Tavern - On the northwest corner of the Crossroads is a yellow stuccoed frame building (old log tavern) with a center stone chimney, which was Barbee's tavern, dating from the pre-stage coach days, circa 1787 built by Joe Barbee. The tavern was in operation during colonial and Civil War times and apparently had a thriving business. The building has wide pine flooring, exposed American Chestnut interior logs, and three stone fireplaces. When the tavern was converted to a house, while in the process of removing many of the walls, the owners, Mr. and Mrs. Thomas Furr (Joe Barbee's grand daughter and her husband), found the walls were lined with old newspapers. It is believed this was also the location of Barbee's Post Office. Barbee's Post Office was actually attached to a house on the Southwest corner of the Crossroads, directly across from Barbee's Tavern.

The Hume Historic District was listed on the National Register of Historic Places in 2008.
