= Hume Historic District =

Historic district in Virginia, United States

- U.S. National Register of Historic Places
- U.S. Historic district
- Virginia Landmarks Register
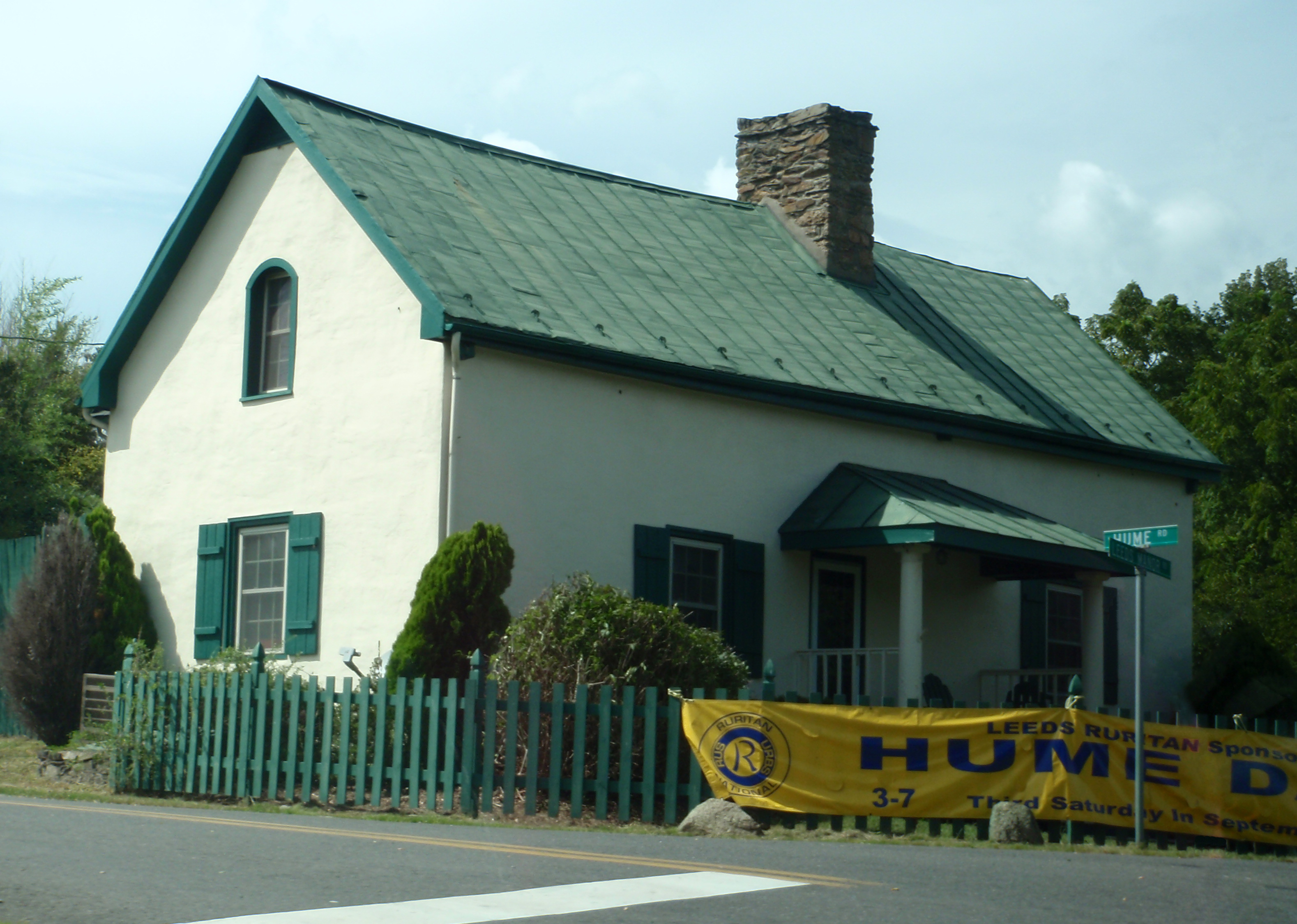
- Hume Historic District, September 2012

- Location within Northern Virginia Location within Virginia Location within the United States
- Location: Hume & Leeds Manor Rds., Hume, Virginia
- Coordinates: 38°49′55″N 77°59′58″W
- Area: 63 acres (25 ha)
- Built: 1787
- Architectural style: Mid 19th Century Revival, Late Victorian
- NRHP reference No.: 08000070
- VLR No.: 030-5158

Significant dates
- Added to NRHP: February 21, 2008
- Designated VLR: December 5, 2007

Hume Historic District is a national historic district located at Hume, Fauquier County, Virginia. It encompasses 59 contributing buildings in the rural village of Hume. The majority of the buildings in the district are vernacular in nature and are late-19th- to early- 20th-century frame dwellings of the side-passage and I-house form. It also contains three commercial buildings, a church, two schools, and a former tavern. Notable buildings include Barbee's Tavern (c. 1787), "The Dell," the parsonage for Leeds Church (c. 1855), former Captain Marshall's Store (c. 1860), the African-American Hume School (c. 1906), the former Hume Methodist Church (c. 1900), and the Hume Baptist Church (1921).

It was listed on the National Register of Historic Places in 2008.
