= Hopfield =

Hopfield may refer to:

- A field used for cultivating hops
- Hopfield net, a type of neural network
- John Joseph Hopfield (born 1933), American biologist and physicist, inventor of the Hopfield net
- John J. Hopfield (spectroscopist) (1891–1953), American spectroscopist, with several eponymous spectral details:
  - Hopfield bands, one of the important molecular oxygen absorption bands
  - Lyman–Birge–Hopfield bands (LBH bands), one of the important molecular nitrogen absorption bands
  - Hopfield continuum, a band in the emission spectrum of helium

== See also ==
- Adventure in the Hopfields, a 1954 black and white short (60 min) film, directed by John Guillermin and written by John Cresswell, thought to have been lost until 2002 when an American film fan found a copy in a rubbish skip outside a Chicago television studio
