= Bristersburg, Virginia =

Unincorporated community in Virginia, United States

- Unincorporated community
- Location within Northern Virginia Location within Virginia Location within the United States
- Coordinates: 38°39′27″N 77°43′01″W
- Country: United States
- State: Virginia
- County: Fauquier
- Time zone: UTC−5 (Eastern (EST))
  - Summer (DST): UTC−4 (EDT)
- GNIS feature ID: 1463830

Bristersburg is an unincorporated community in Fauquier County, Virginia, United States. It is in the southern part of the county, centered on State Route 806 and State Route 616. The village is near Prince William County and Stafford County.

The Bristersburg Historic District was listed on the National Register of Historic Places in 2009.
