= Gen. William Mitchell House =

Historic house in Virginia, United States

- Gen. William "Billy" Mitchell House
- U.S. National Register of Historic Places
- U.S. National Historic Landmark
- Virginia Landmarks Register
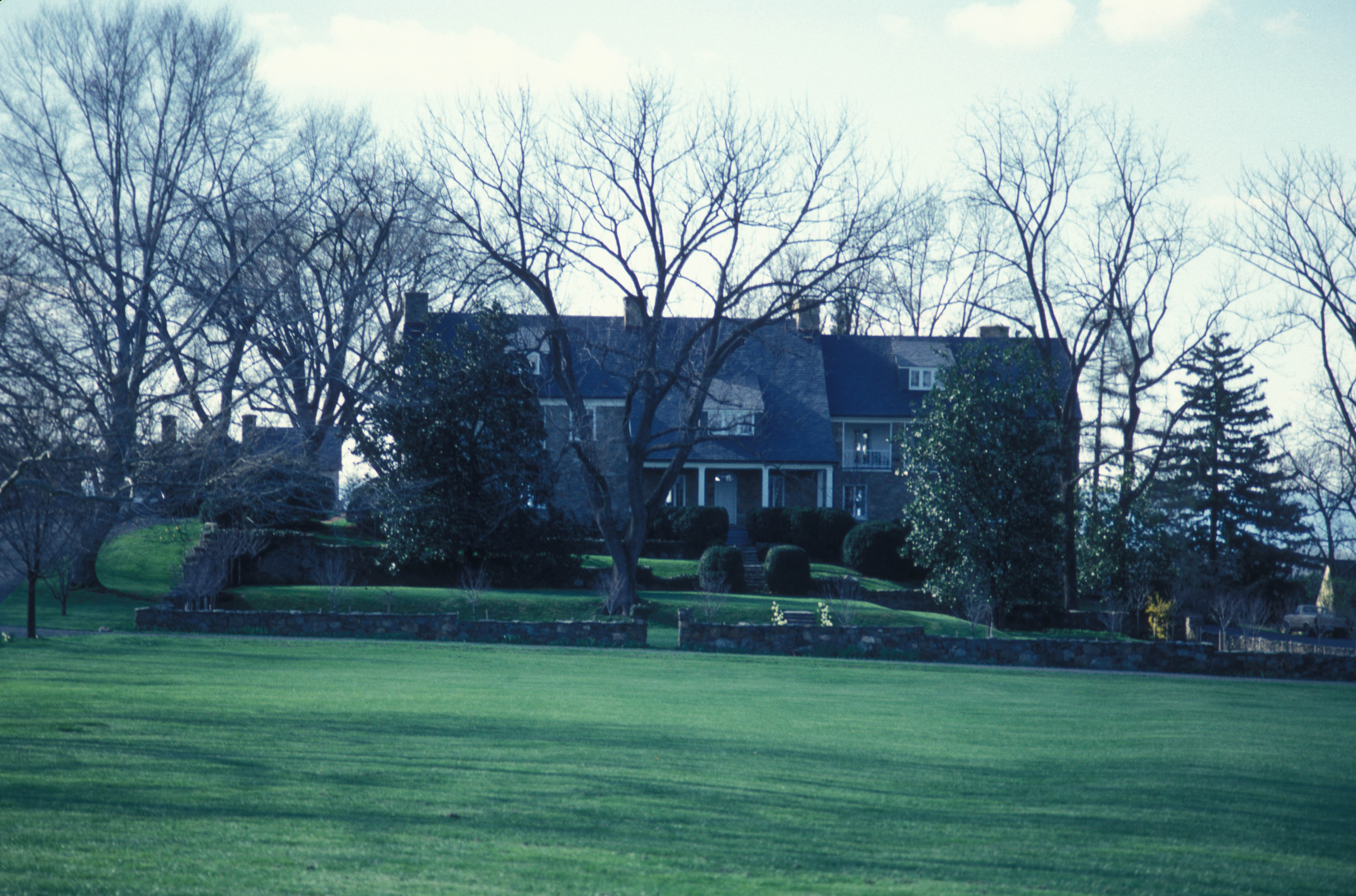

- Location within Northern Virginia Location within Virginia Location within the United States
- Interactive map of Gen. William "Billy" Mitchell House
- Location: 0.5 miles (0.80 km) south of Middleburg on VA 626, near Middleburg, Virginia
- Coordinates: 38°57′40″N 77°44′44″W
- Area: 120 acres (49 ha)
- Built: 1826
- Architect: William Swart; William Mitchell
- NRHP reference No.: 76002112
- VLR No.: 030-0091

Significant dates
- Added to NRHP: December 8, 1976
- Designated NHL: December 8, 1976
- Designated VLR: February 15, 1977

Gen. William Mitchell House, also known as Boxwood or the Gen. Billy Mitchell House was the country estate and home of General Billy Mitchell (1879–1936) during the last ten years of his life, from 1926 through 1936. Mitchell was an American general who is regarded as the father of the U.S. Air Force. He is regarded as one of the most famous and most controversial figures in American airpower history. The house was declared a National Historic Landmark in 1976. It is located about .5 mile south of Middleburg on Virginia Route 626, straddling the county lines of Fauquier and Loudoun Counties. Part of the estate is now home to Boxwood Estate Winery.

== Description and history ==
Boxwood is 120 acres (49 ha) located south of the Loudoun County town of Middleburg, extending along the northwest side of VA 626 roughly from the city line to the highway's junction with Virginia Route 705. The centerpiece of the estate is a cluster of buildings that are set well back from the road. The main building is the farmhouse, which has at its core an 1826 farmstead. Now L-shaped in plan, it is 2 1/2 stories in height, with stone walls and wooden trim. The original farmhouse portion has a bellcast roof that curves down to shelter a porch.

The original farmhouse was built in 1826 by William Swart, and passed through several hands before its purchase in 1925 by Elizabeth Mitchell, the wife of General Billy Mitchell. The Mitchells added an ell to the southwest in 1925, and also built an outbuilding that served them as a library. It was their home until Mitchell died in 1936, and has not received major alterations since then. Mitchell, a horse enthusiast, kept horses and wrote extensively during his years there, expanding on his theories regarding the military use of air power.

== See also ==
- Billy Mitchell (volcano)
- Mount Billy Mitchell (Chugach Mountains)
- List of National Historic Landmarks in Virginia
- National Register of Historic Places listings in Fauquier County, Virginia
- National Register of Historic Places listings in Loudoun County, Virginia
