= Yorkshire House =

Historic house in Virginia, United States

- U.S. National Register of Historic Places
- Virginia Landmarks Register
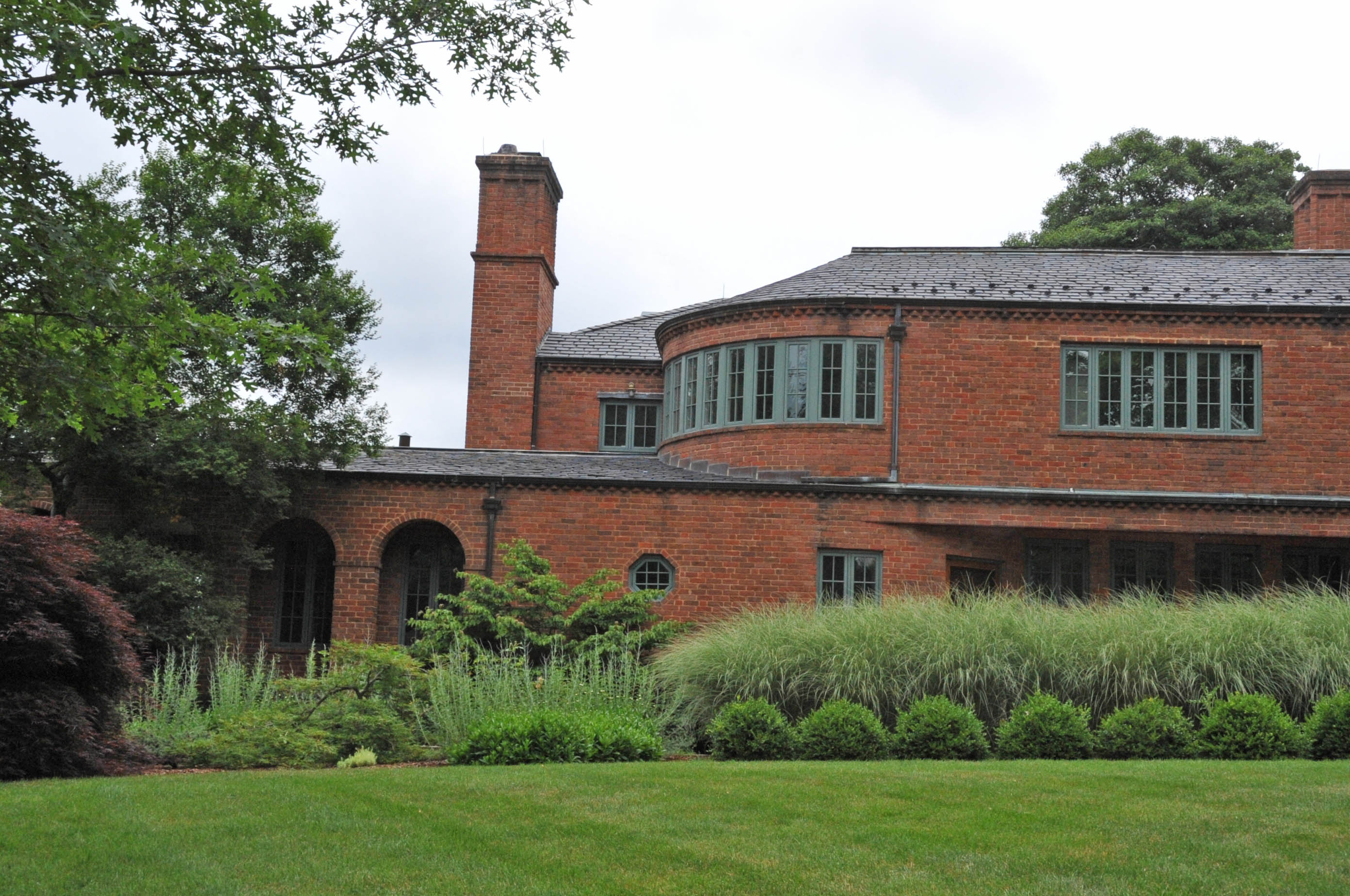

- Location within Northern Virginia Location within Virginia Location within the United States
- Location: 405 Winchester St., Warrenton, Virginia
- Coordinates: 38°43′30″N 77°47′57″W
- Area: 9.8 acres (4.0 ha)
- Built: 1938-1939
- Built by: Grant, Charles T.
- Architect: Heller, Henri de
- Architectural style: Modern Movement
- NRHP reference No.: 05000522
- VLR No.: 156-5095

Significant dates
- Added to NRHP: June 1, 2005
- Designated VLR: March 16, 2005

Yorkshire House is a historic home located at Warrenton, Fauquier County, Virginia. It was built in 1938–1939, and is a two-story, 13 bay, brick dwelling in the Modern Movement style. It features a low-pitched slate roof, a horizontal emphasis, a curved corner with continuous steel windows, a large glass block window, an elliptical bay window with steel casements and a foliated, geometric, metal balustrade on the rear balcony. Also on the property are the contributing brick and- stucco garage, a banked stone pump house, and a frame storage shed (c. 1939).

It was listed on the National Register of Historic Places in 2005."
