= The Oaks (Warrenton, Virginia) =

Historic house in Virginia, United States

- U.S. National Register of Historic Places
- Virginia Landmarks Register
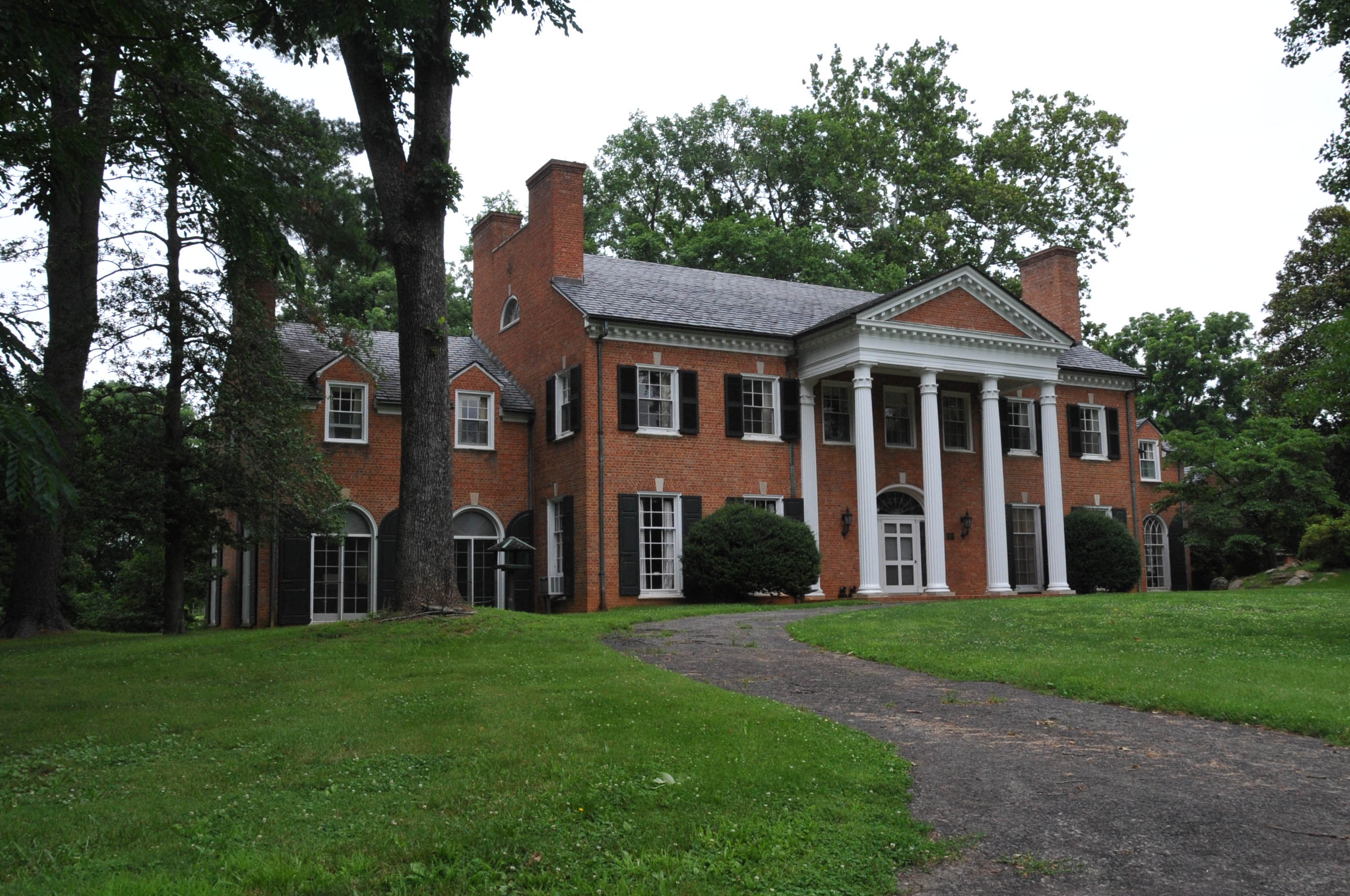

- Location within Northern Virginia Location within Virginia Location within the United States
- Location: 8457 Oaks Rd., near Warrenton, Virginia
- Coordinates: 38°41′04″N 77°50′52″W
- Area: 151.4 acres (61.3 ha)
- Built: 1931–1933
- Built by: Fleming, W.H. Irwin; Hanback, W.J.
- Architectural style: Classical Revival
- NRHP reference No.: 02000585
- VLR No.: 030-0320

Significant dates
- Added to NRHP: May 30, 2002
- Designated VLR: December 5, 2001

The Oaks, also known as Innes Hill, is a historic home and farm located near Warrenton, Fauquier County, Virginia. The house was built between 1931 and 1933, and consists of a 1 to 2 1/2-story, five-bay, Classical Revival style main block with a four-part plan. The attached sections are a one-story pantry and kitchen wing and garage attached by a four-bay arcade. The main block features a prominent two-story, four-bay, pedimented portico has four extraordinary fluted Tower of the Winds columns. Also on the property are the contributing Italianate style brick stable (c. 1847); a brick smokehouse; and an agent's cottage, tile barn, corn house, spring house and summerhouse built between 1928 and 1930; garage with servants' quarters, greenhouse, log cabin, potato house, pump house, chicken house and field shed built between 1931 and 1945; the mansion landscape and scene of the 1881 duel; and a windmill. In September 1881, it was the site of one of the last four duels in Virginia, prior to enactment of anti-duel legislation in 1882.

It was listed on the National Register of Historic Places in 2002.
