= Orlean Historic District =

Historic district in Virginia, United States

- U.S. National Register of Historic Places
- U.S. Historic district
- Virginia Landmarks Register
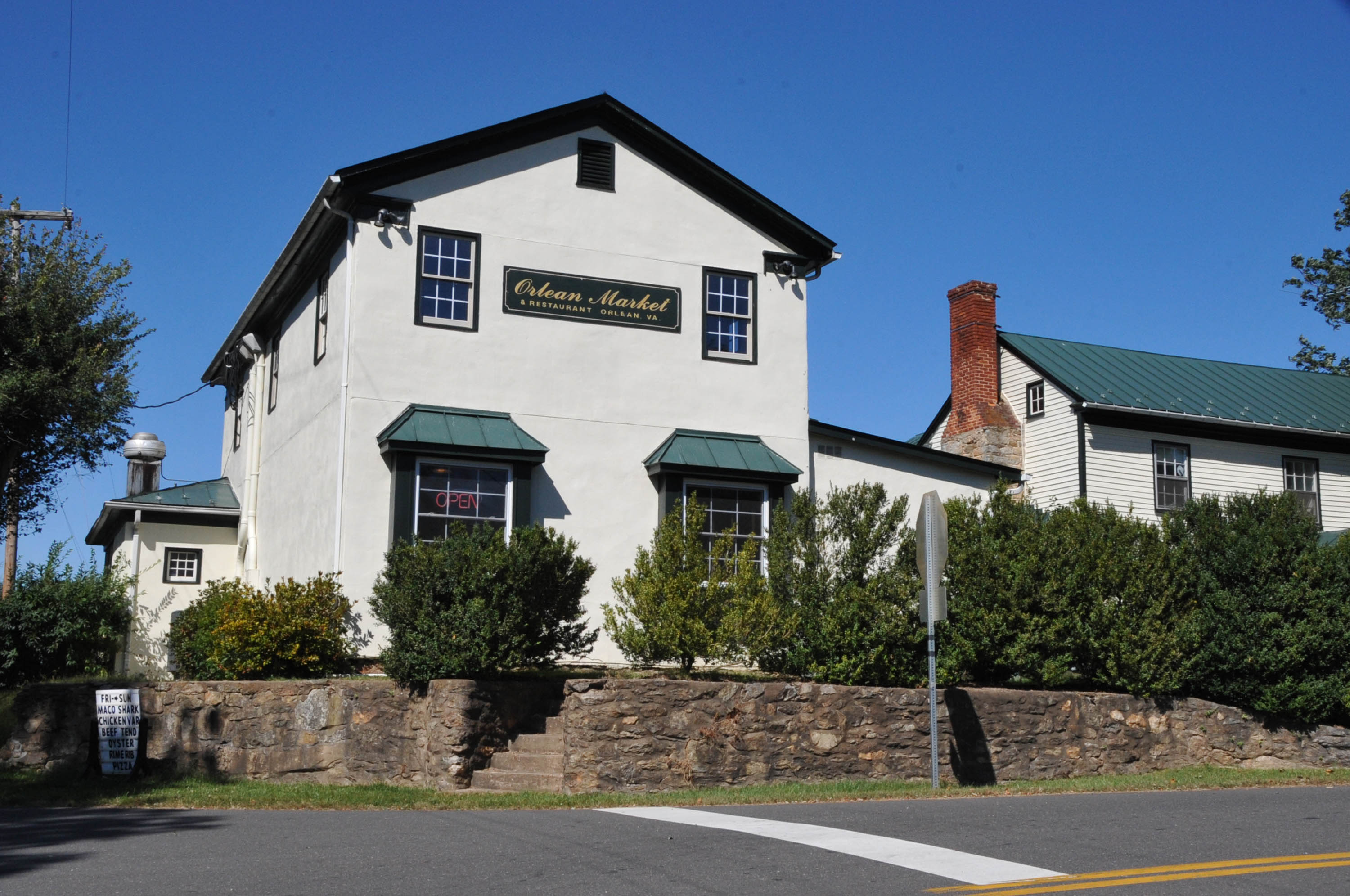

- Location within Northern Virginia Location within Virginia Location within the United States
- Location: Area including parts of John Barnton Payne and Leeds Manor Rds., Orlean, Virginia
- Coordinates: 38°45′10″N 77°47′50″W
- Area: 80 acres (32 ha)
- Built: 1817
- Architect: Hinckley, Albert P. Jr. (Post Office)
- Architectural style: Federal, Greek Revival, Queen Anne
- NRHP reference No.: 09000615
- VLR No.: 030-5159

Significant dates
- Added to NRHP: August 14, 2009
- Designated VLR: June 18, 2009

Orlean Historic District is a national historic district located at Orlean, Fauquier County, Virginia. It encompasses 51 contributing buildings and 2 contributing sites in the rural village of Orlean. The district includes commercial buildings, churches, a post office, a former school, and multiple residences and their ancillary outbuildings that date from the late 18th century to the mid-20th century. Notable buildings include the Orlean Farm House (c. 1795), Smith-Hinkley House (c. 1830), the Anderson-Rector House and Store (c. 1870), the Greek Revival style Thorpe-Cornwell House, Jeffries Store (1885), Orlean Methodist Church (1881–1883), Providence Baptist Church (1883), and Orlean post office building (1956).

It was listed on the National Register of Historic Places in 2009.

== Gallery ==
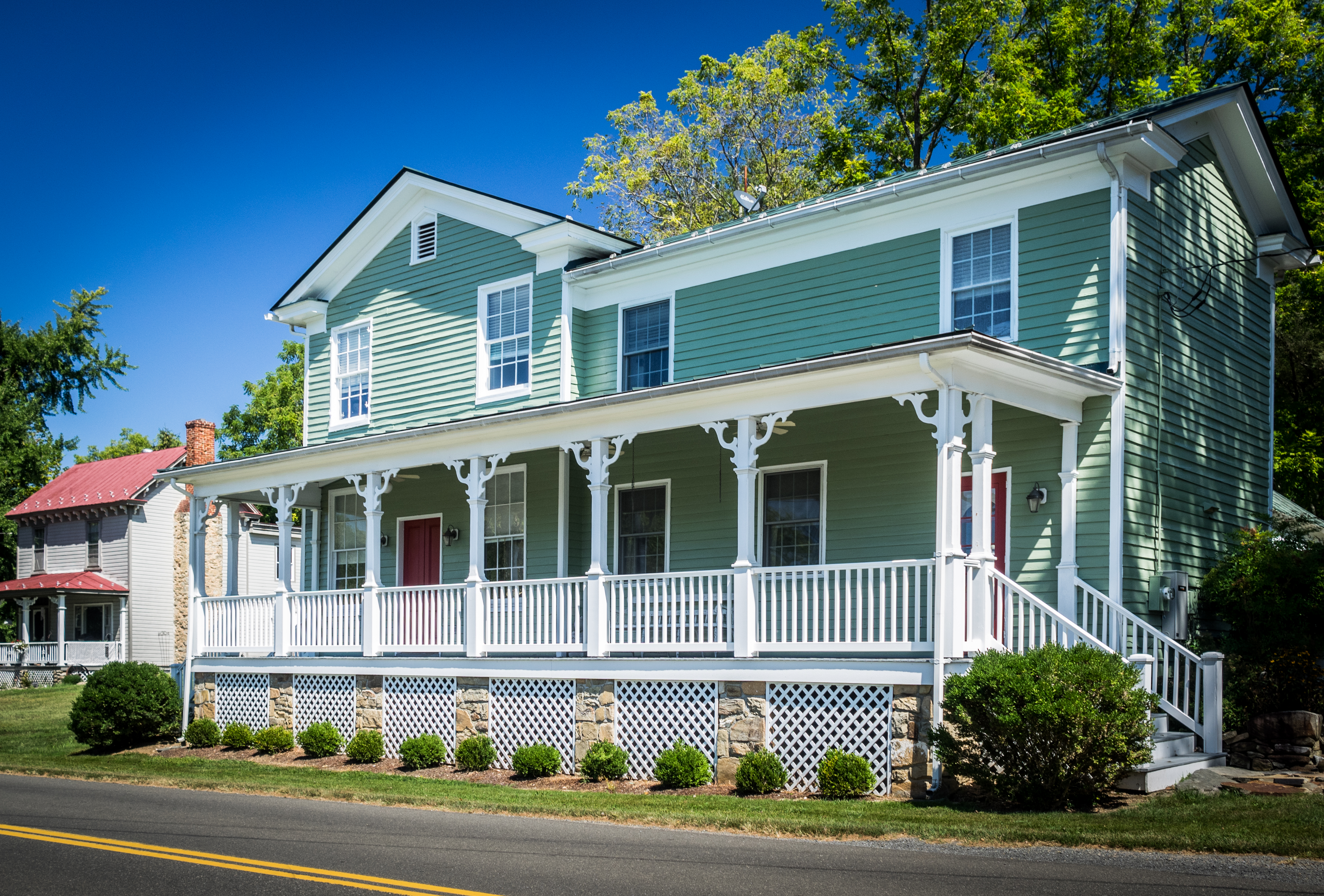
Jeffries Store, now a residence

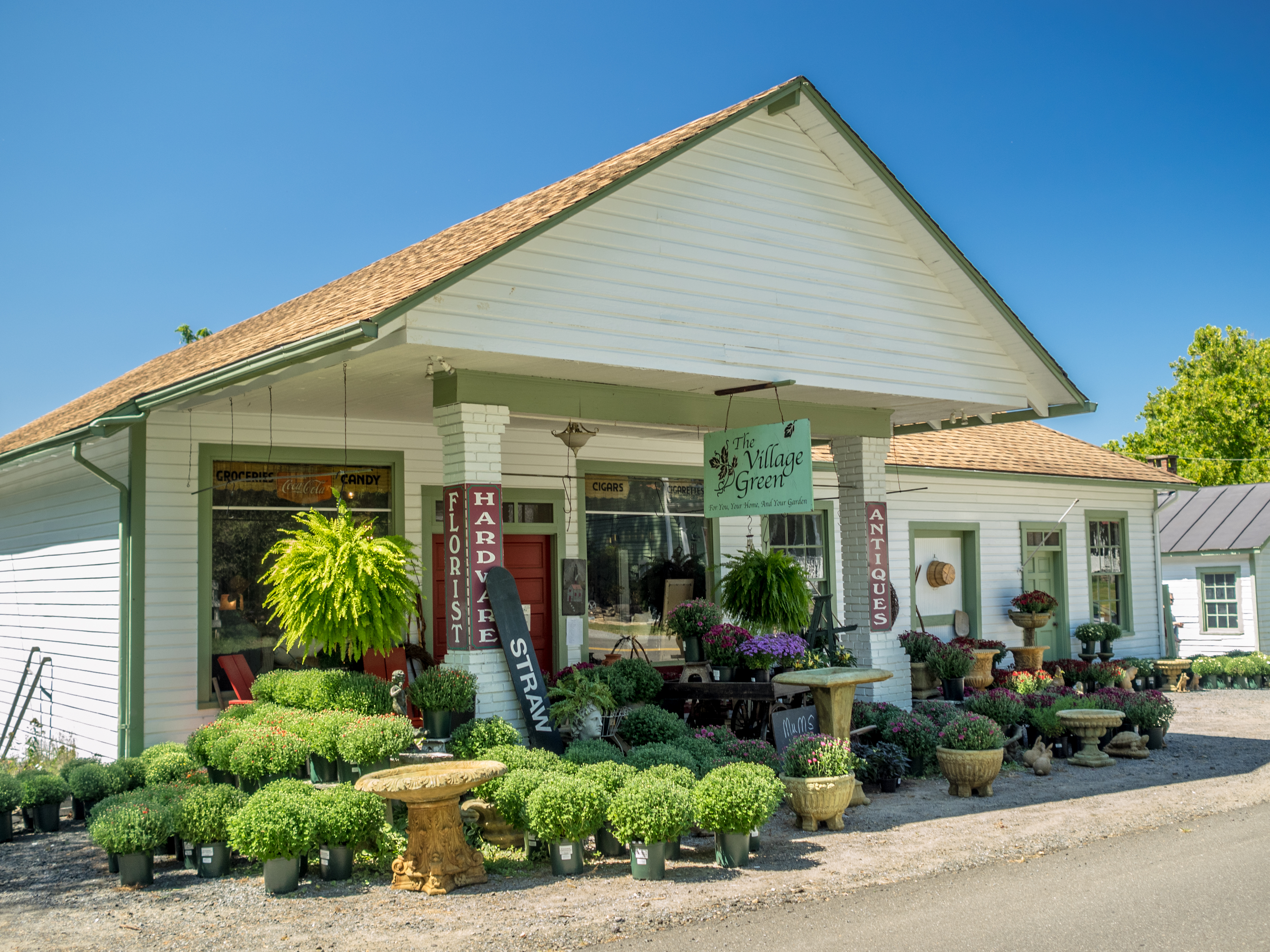
Russell's Store, across the street from Jeffries Store

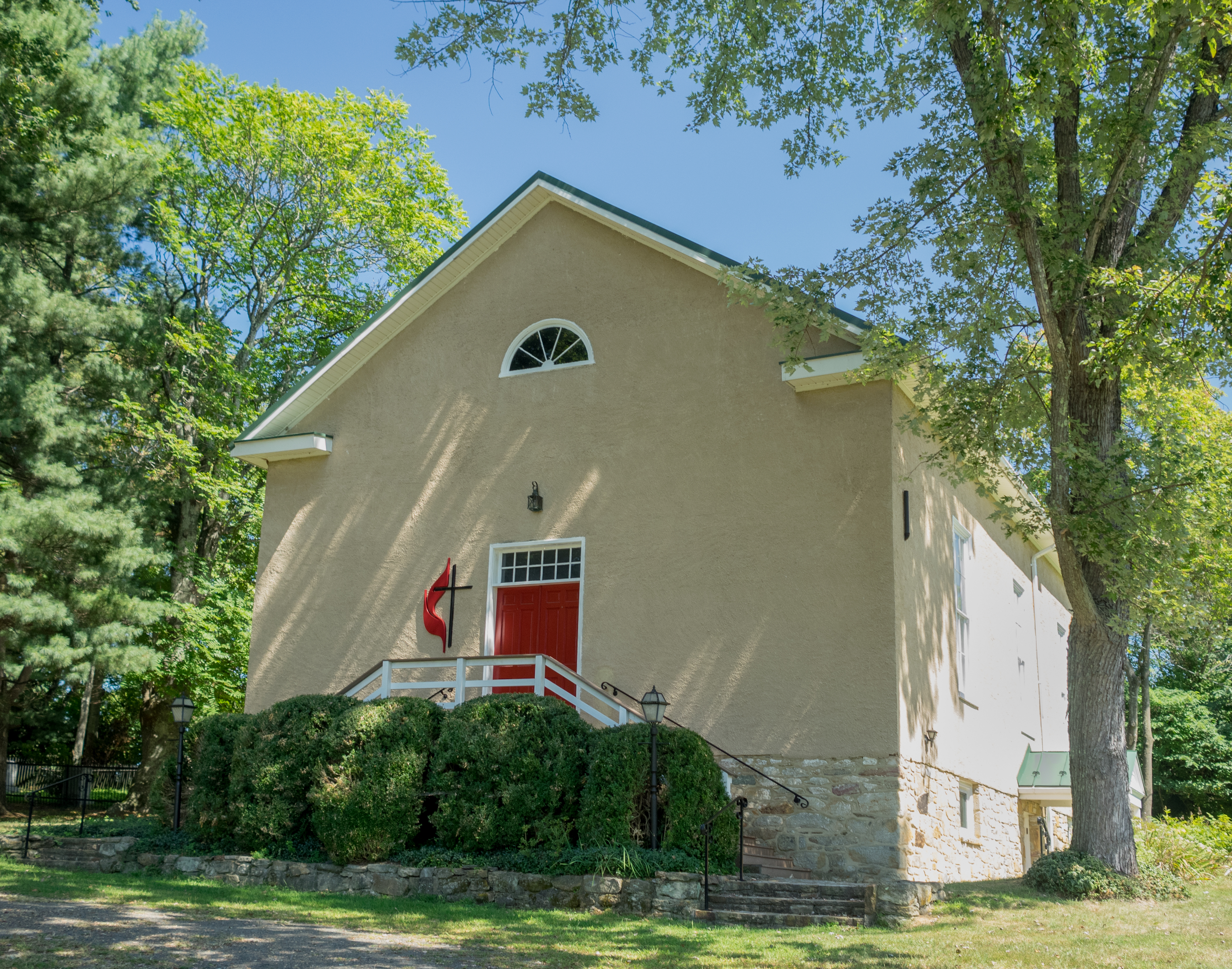
United Methodist Church

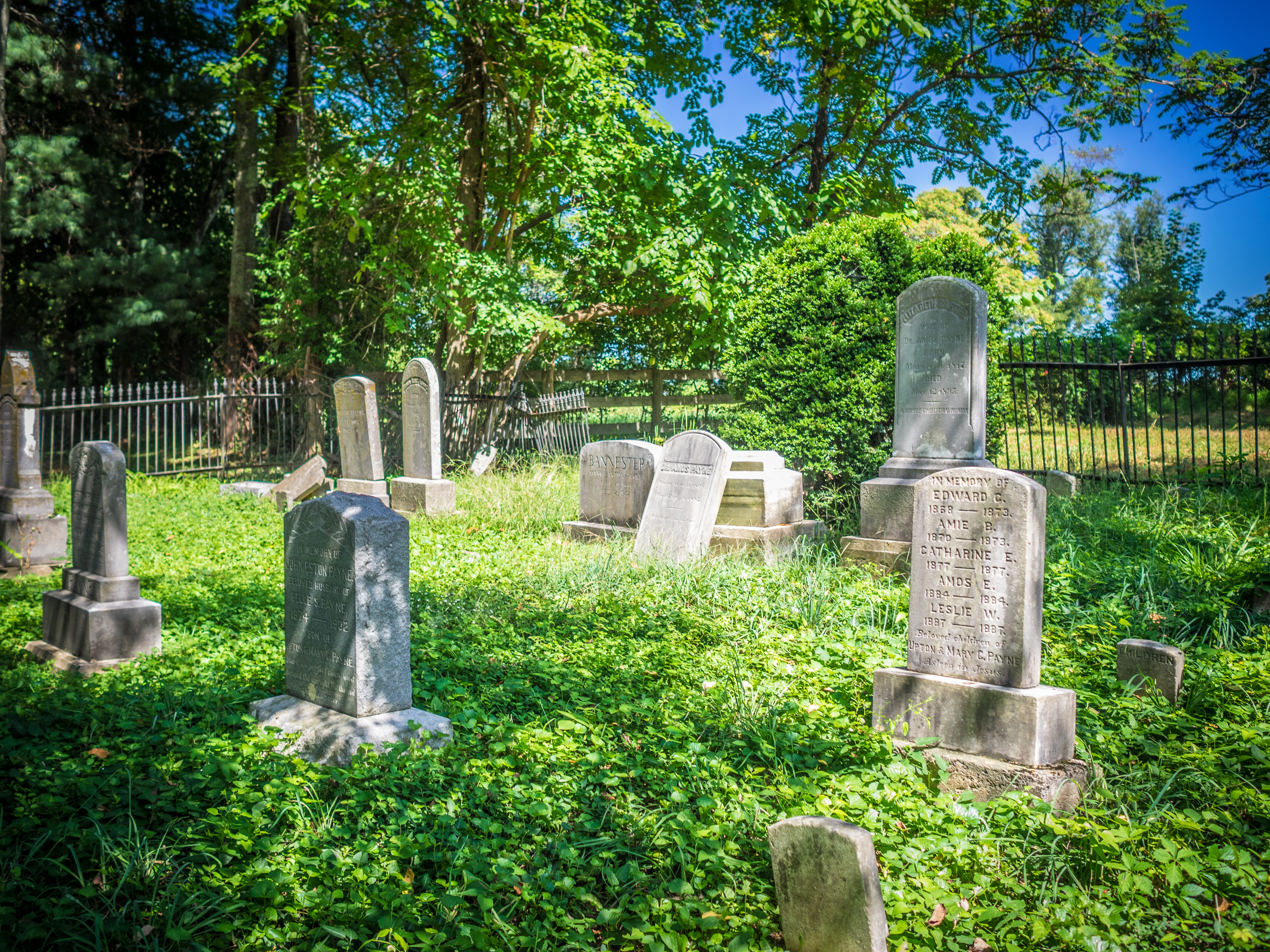
Methodist Cemetery

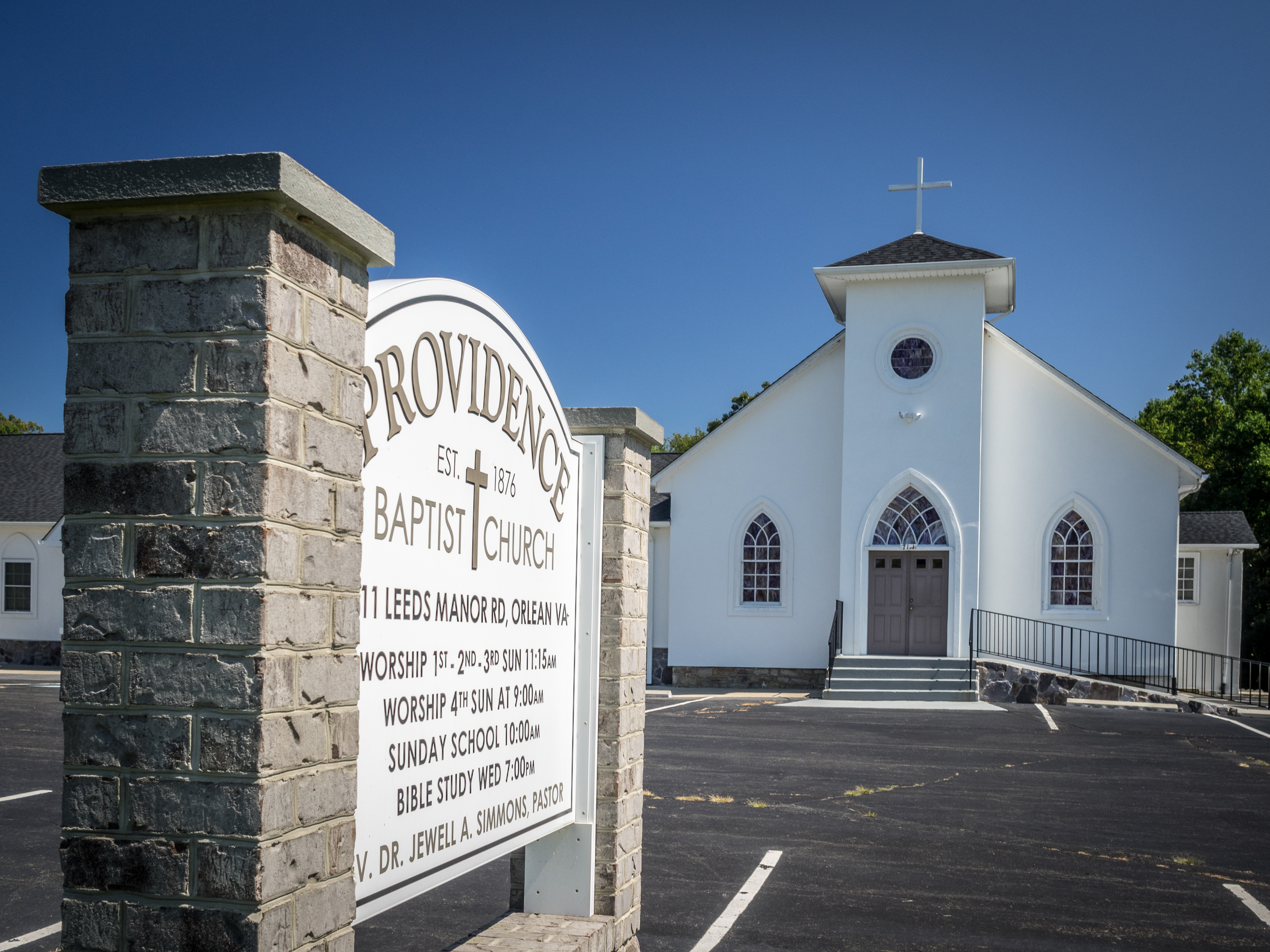
Providence Baptist Church
