= Bristersburg Historic District =

Historic district in Virginia, United States

- U.S. National Register of Historic Places
- U.S. Historic district
- Virginia Landmarks Register
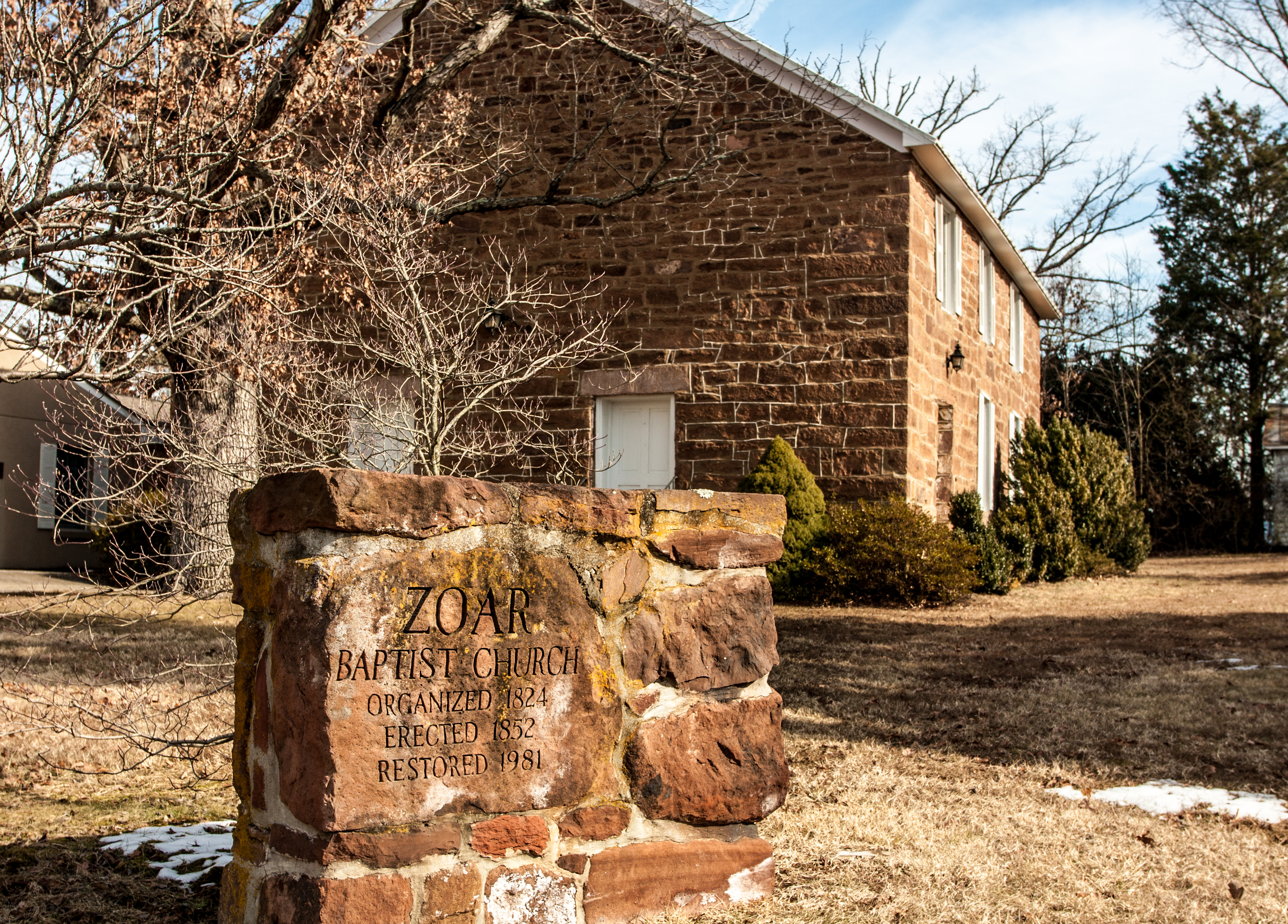
- Zoar Baptist Church at the intersection of VA 806 and VA 616

- Location within Northern Virginia Location within Virginia Location within the United States
- Location: Area including parts of Elk Run and Bristersburg Rds., Bristersburg, Virginia
- Coordinates: 38°35′00″N 77°36′50″W
- Area: 28 acres (11 ha)
- Built: 1838
- Architectural style: Queen Anne
- NRHP reference No.: 09000336
- VLR No.: 030-5161

Significant dates
- Added to NRHP: May 21, 2009
- Designated VLR: March 19, 2009

Bristersburg Historic District is a national historic district located at Bristersburg, Fauquier County, Virginia. It encompasses 19 contributing buildings, 1 contributing site, 1 contributing structure, and 1 contributing object in the rural crossroads of Bristersburg. They include three dwellings, a church, a school, and three stores. Notable buildings include the Tulloss Brothers Store (c. 1838), Zoar Baptist Church (1852), Bristone House (c. 1912), Compton’s Store (c. 1905), Eskridge House (c. 1850, c. 1890), The Bristersburg School (1910) and Payne's Store (c. 1880).

It was listed on the National Register of Historic Places in 2009.

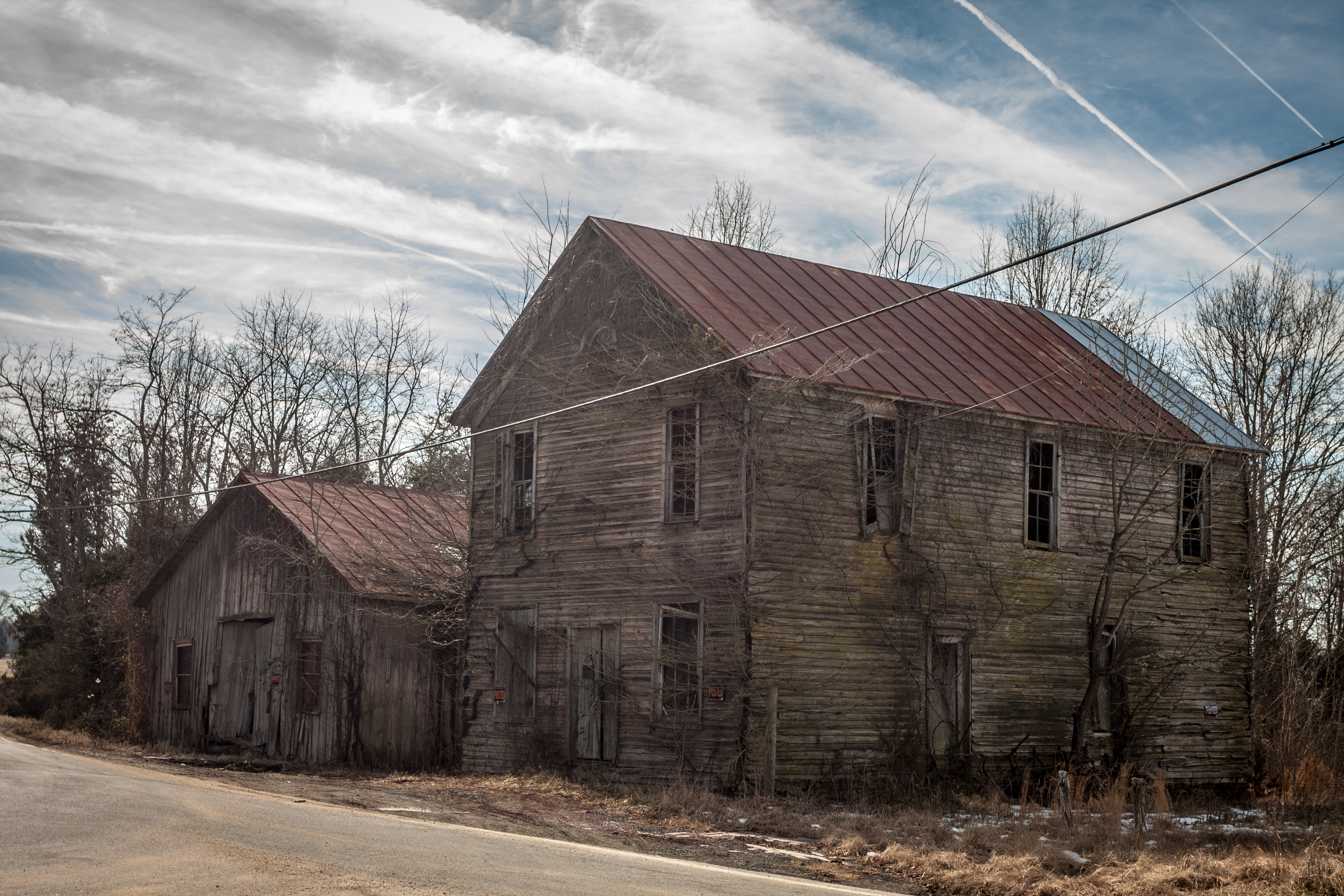
Old buildings at corner of VA 806 and VA 616
