= Sumerduck, Virginia =

Unincorporated community in Virginia, United States

- Unincorporated community
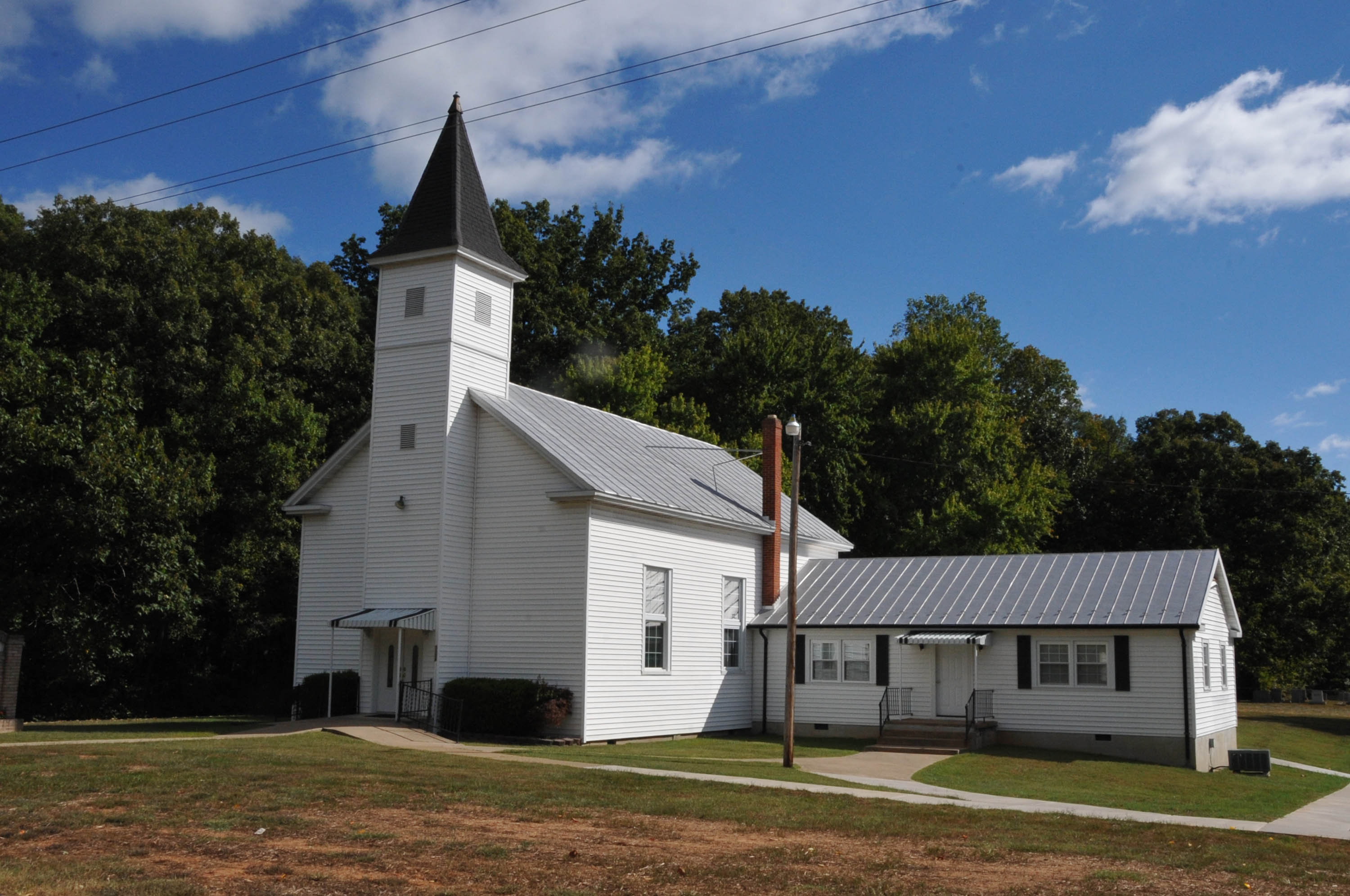
- Embrey Memorial Baptist Church in Sumerduck

- Location within Northern Virginia Location within Virginia Location within the United States
- Coordinates: 38°27′36″N 77°43′41″W
- Country: United States
- State: Virginia
- County: Fauquier
- Time zone: UTC−5 (Eastern (EST))
  - Summer (DST): UTC−4 (EDT)
- GNIS feature ID: 1477790

Sumerduck (/ˈsʌmərdʌk/ SUM-ər-duk) is a small unincorporated village located equidistant between Fredericksburg, Culpeper, and Warrenton, as it is in Fauquier County in the U.S. state of Virginia.

The name was derived from the fact that ducks flocked here in the summer. Sumerduck is home to the major portion of the C.F. Phelps Wildlife Management Area, with several entrances to the reserve off of the major thoroughfare, VA Route 651. The community is also home to Cider Lab (a small batch, craft cidery), Rogers Ford Farm Winery and Smith's Antiques.

The Sumerduck Historic District was listed on the National Register of Historic Places in 2009.
