= Orlean, Virginia =

Unincorporated community in Virginia, United States

- Unincorporated village
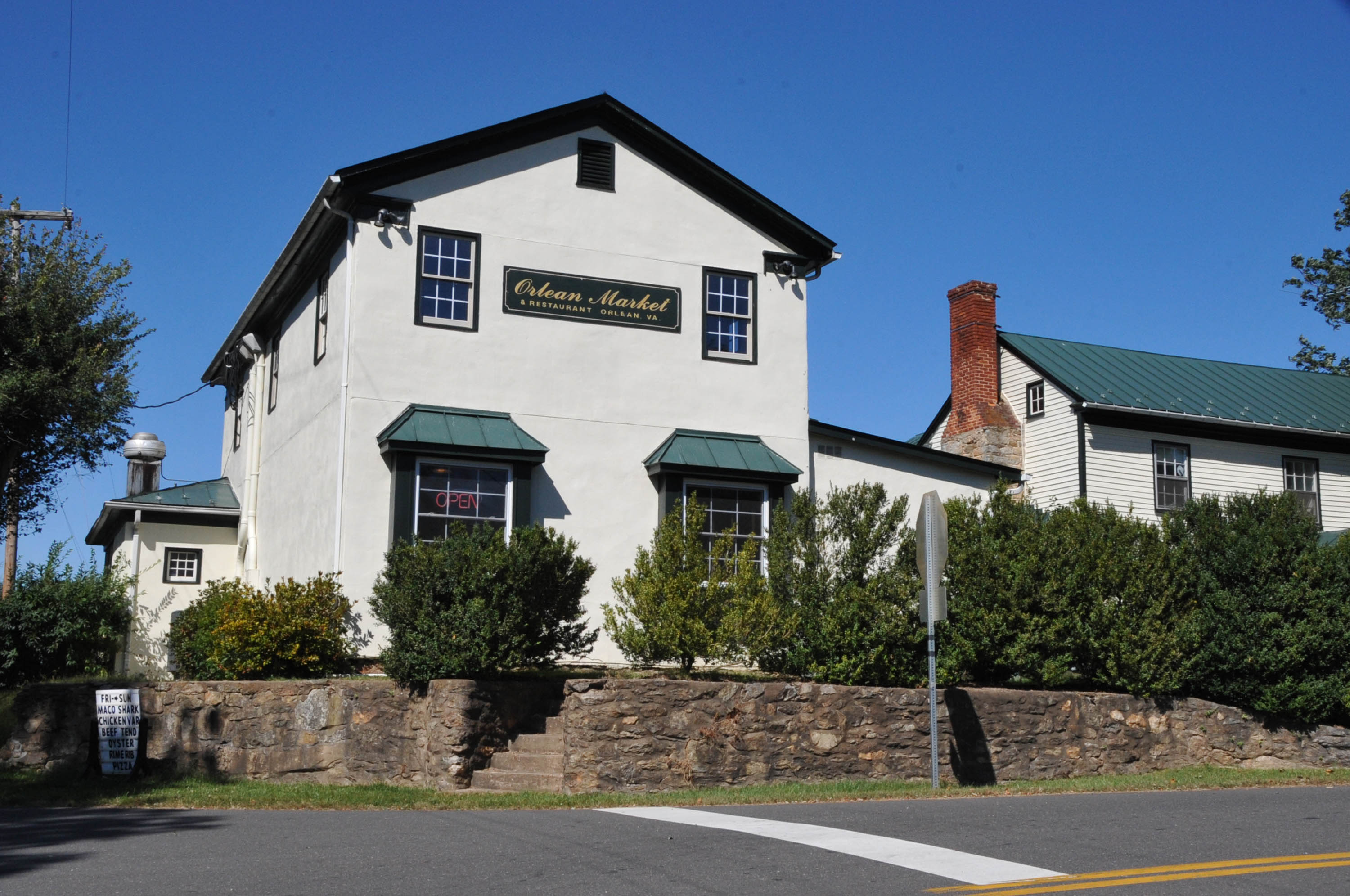

- Location within Northern Virginia Location within Virginia Location within the United States
- Coordinates: 38°45′09″N 77°57′50″W
- Country: United States
- State: Virginia
- County: Fauquier
- Time zone: UTC−5 (Eastern (EST))
  - Summer (DST): UTC−4 (EDT)
- ZIP codes: 20128

Orlean is a small unincorporated village in Fauquier County, Virginia, United States, located approximately 50 miles (80 km) west of Washington, D.C.. Orlean is situated at the intersection of Leeds Manor Road (County Route 688) and John Barton Payne Road (County Route 732). The Orlean Post Office has the ZIP Code of 20128.

The Orlean Historic District was listed on the National Register of Historic Places in 2009.

== Notable people ==
- Colin S. Harris (born 1990), Democratic nominee for the Virginia House of Delegates, 2013
- Humphrey Marshall (1760-1841), politician and U.S. senator from Kentucky, 1795-1801
- John Barton Payne (1855-1935), United States Secretary of the Interior, 1920-1921
