= Sumerduck Historic District =

Historic district in Virginia, United States

- U.S. National Register of Historic Places
- U.S. Historic district
- Virginia Landmarks Register
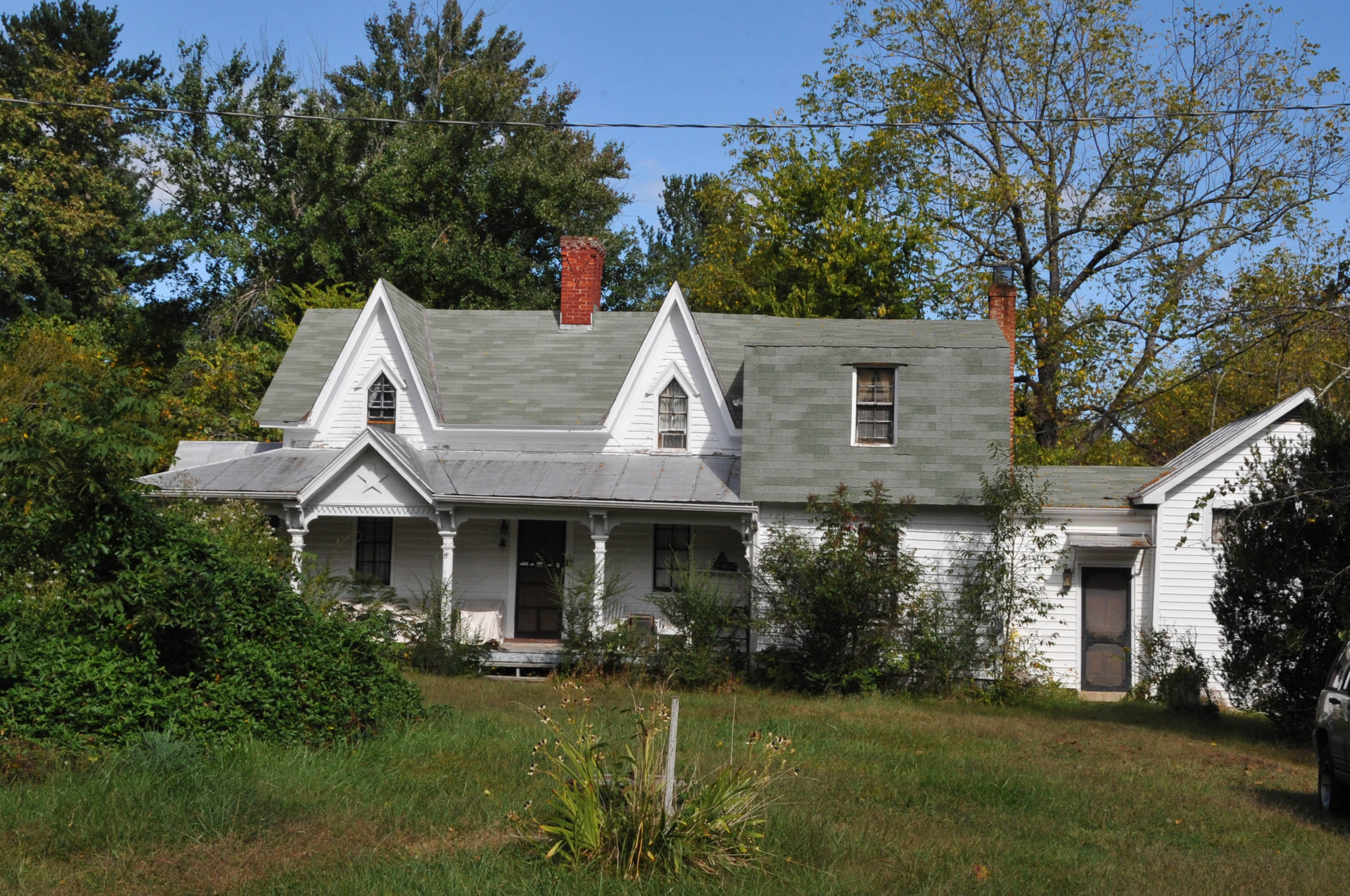
- Henry Broadus Jones House

- Location within Northern Virginia Location within Virginia Location within the United States
- Location: Area including parts of Sumerduck Rd., Sumerduck, Virginia
- Coordinates: 38°45′10″N 77°47′50″W
- Area: 35 acres (14 ha)
- Built: 1882
- Built by: Henry Broadus Jones Sr., Henry Broadus Jones Jr.
- Architectural style: Gothic Revival
- NRHP reference No.: 09000337
- VLR No.: 030-5164

Significant dates
- Added to NRHP: May 21, 2009
- Designated VLR: March 19, 2009

Sumerduck Historic District is a national historic district located at Sumerduck, Fauquier County, Virginia. It encompasses 19 contributing buildings and 1 contributing site in the rural hamlet of Sumerduck. The Reconstruction-era district includes dwellings that date from the late-19th to the mid-20th centuries, stores, churches, a post office, a school, and a public space for meetings. Notable buildings include the Tulloss House (c. 1882), the Henry Broadus Jones House also known as the Santa Claus House or the House of the Seven Gables (c. 1885), the restored Embrey-Mills House (1880s), the Steven Jacobs House (c. 1940), the Union Primitive Baptist Church (c. 1898), Sumerduck Baptist Church (1915), a former school (1887), and Sumerduck Trading Company (c. 1950).

It was listed on the National Register of Historic Places in 2009.

== Gallery ==
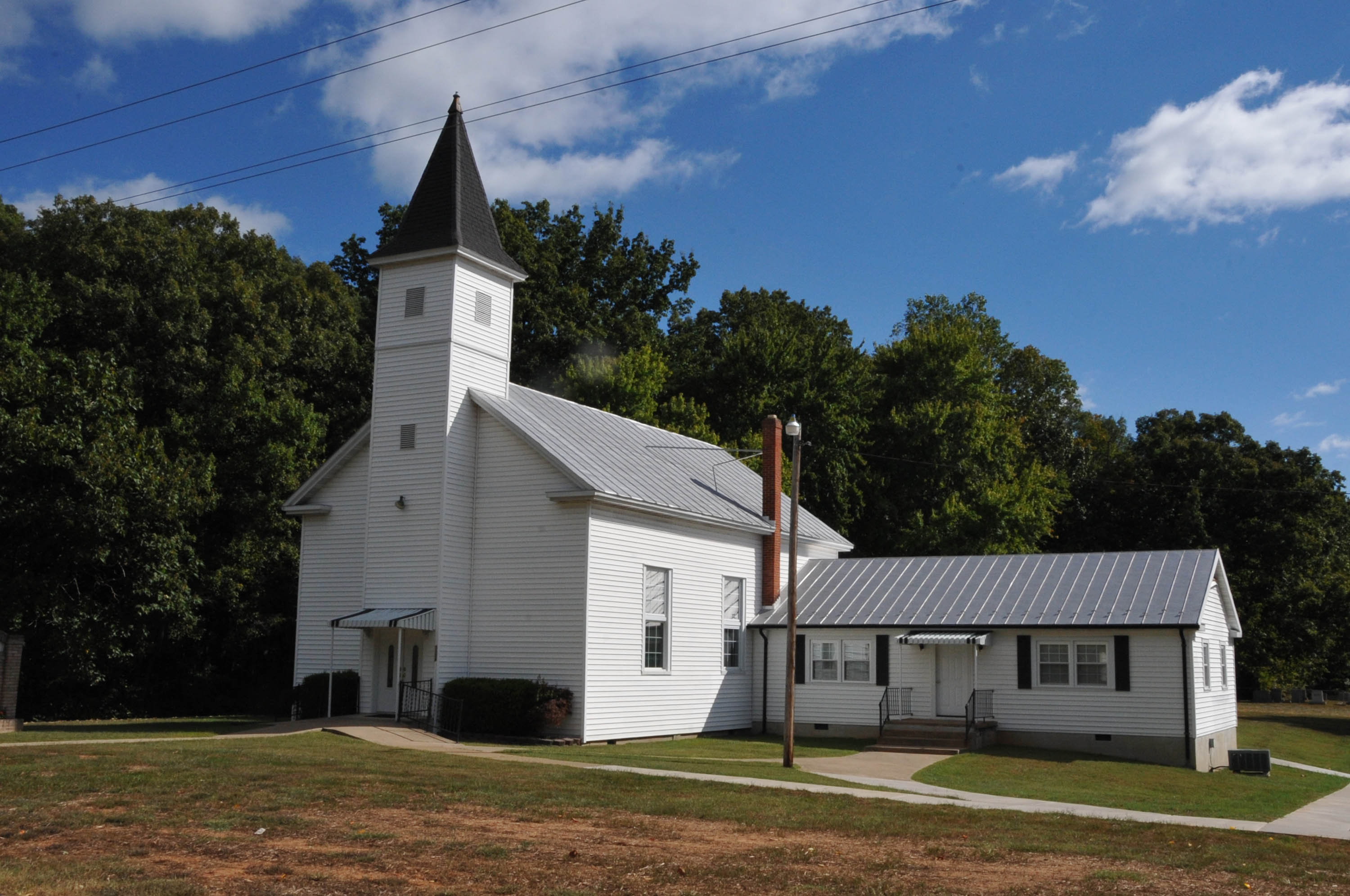
Embrey Memorial Baptist Church

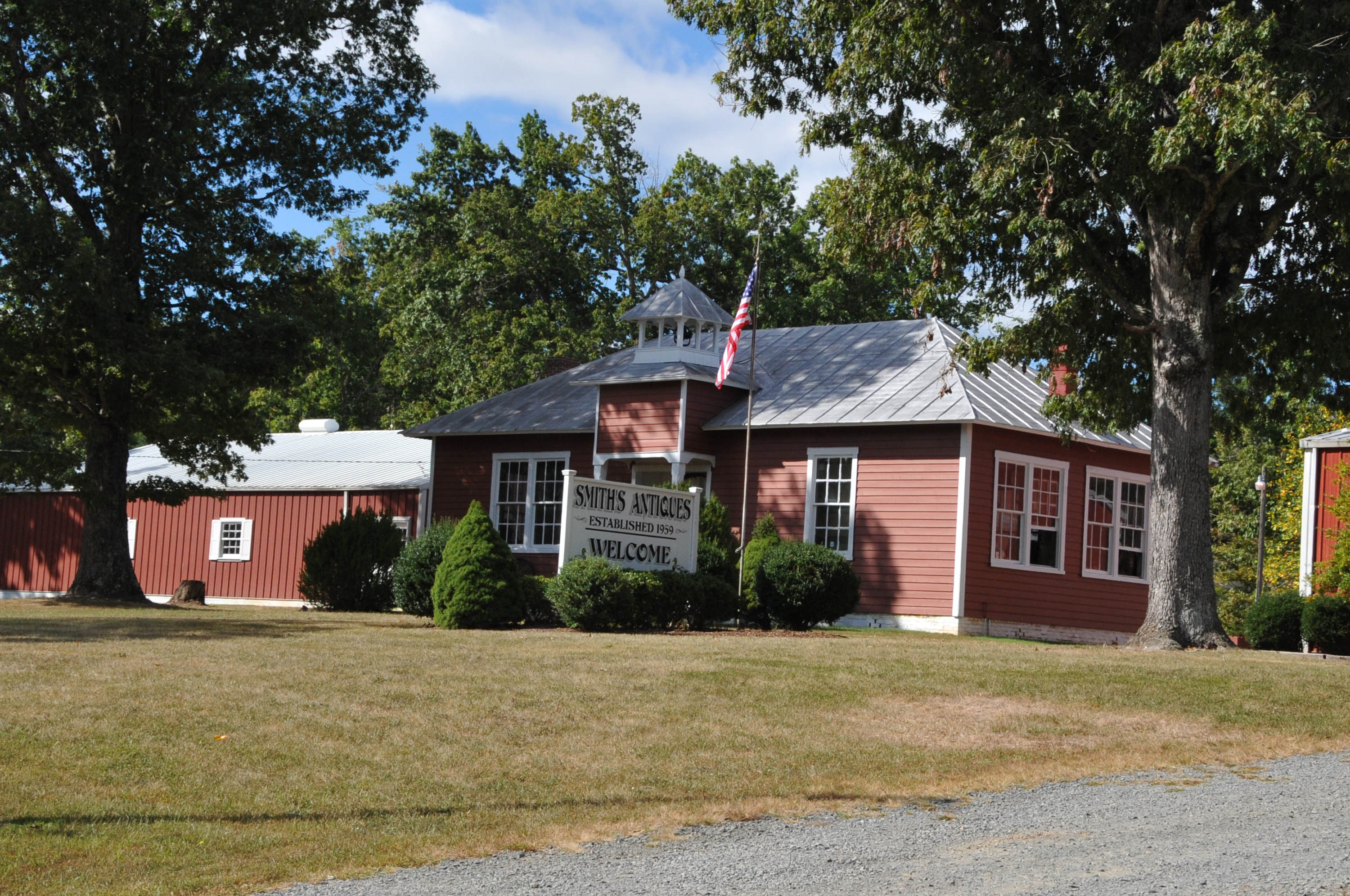
Sumerduck School
