= Old Denton =

Historic house in Virginia, United States

- U.S. National Register of Historic Places
- Virginia Landmarks Register
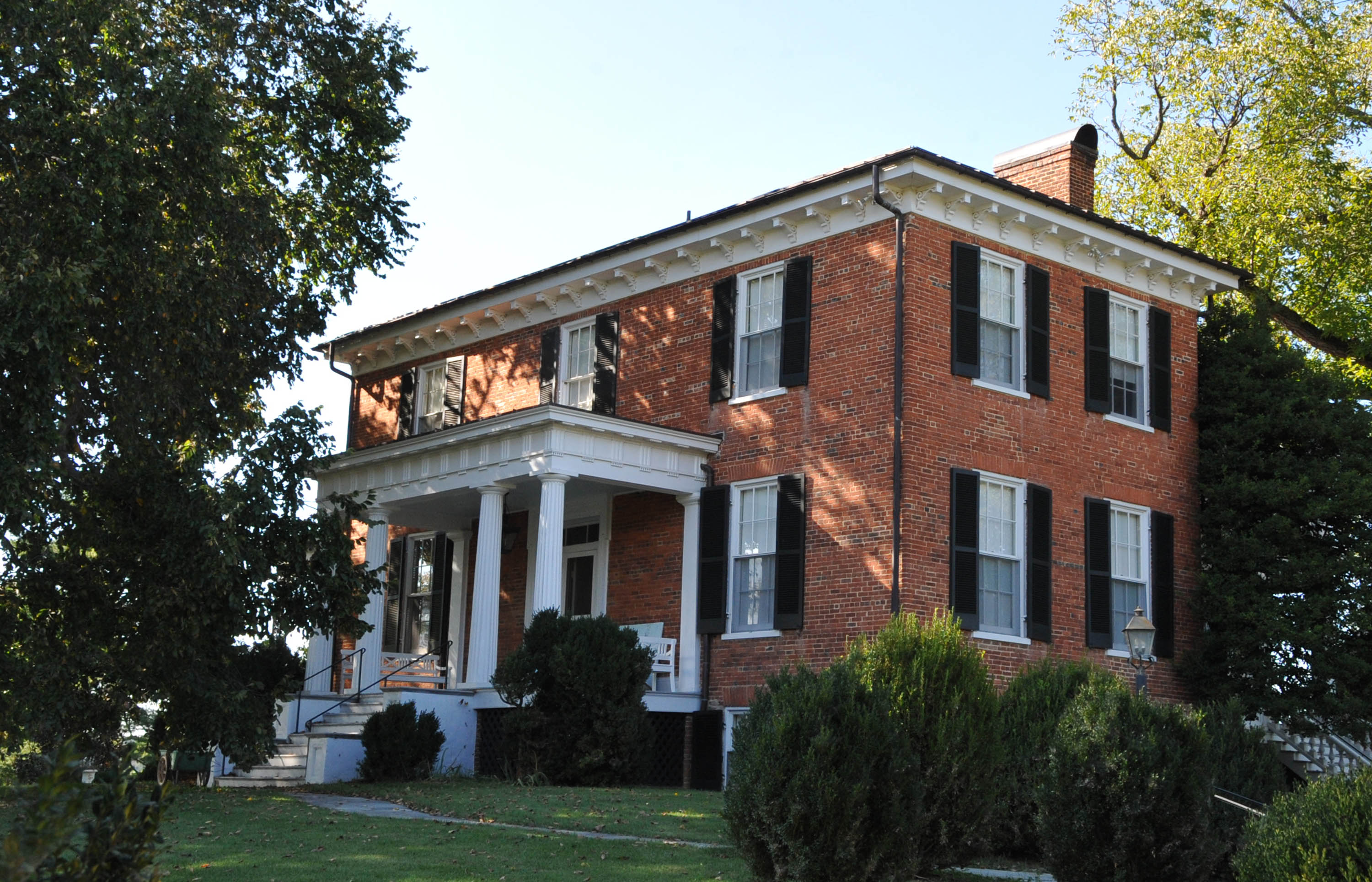

- Location within Northern Virginia Location within Virginia Location within the United States
- Location: 7064 Young Rd., near The Plains, Virginia
- Coordinates: 38°54′55″N 77°47′45″W
- Area: 58 acres (23 ha)
- Built: c. 1860
- Architectural style: Greek Revival
- NRHP reference No.: 12000123
- VLR No.: 030-0570

Significant dates
- Added to NRHP: March 12, 2012
- Designated VLR: December 15, 2011

Old Denton is a historic home and farm complex located near The Plains, Fauquier County, Virginia. The property includes a two-story, brick-masonry main dwelling (c. 1860), a secondary dwelling (c. 1820), a meat house (c. 1860), a stable (c. 1936), a tenant house (c. 1950), three early- 20th-century dry-laid stone walls, and an early-20th-century pump. The house features a one-story, negatively sloped, three-bay, classically inspired, Greek Doric order front porch.

It was listed on the National Register of Historic Places in 2012.
