= Hopefield (Warrenton, Virginia) =

Historic house in Virginia, United States

- U.S. National Register of Historic Places
- Virginia Landmarks Register
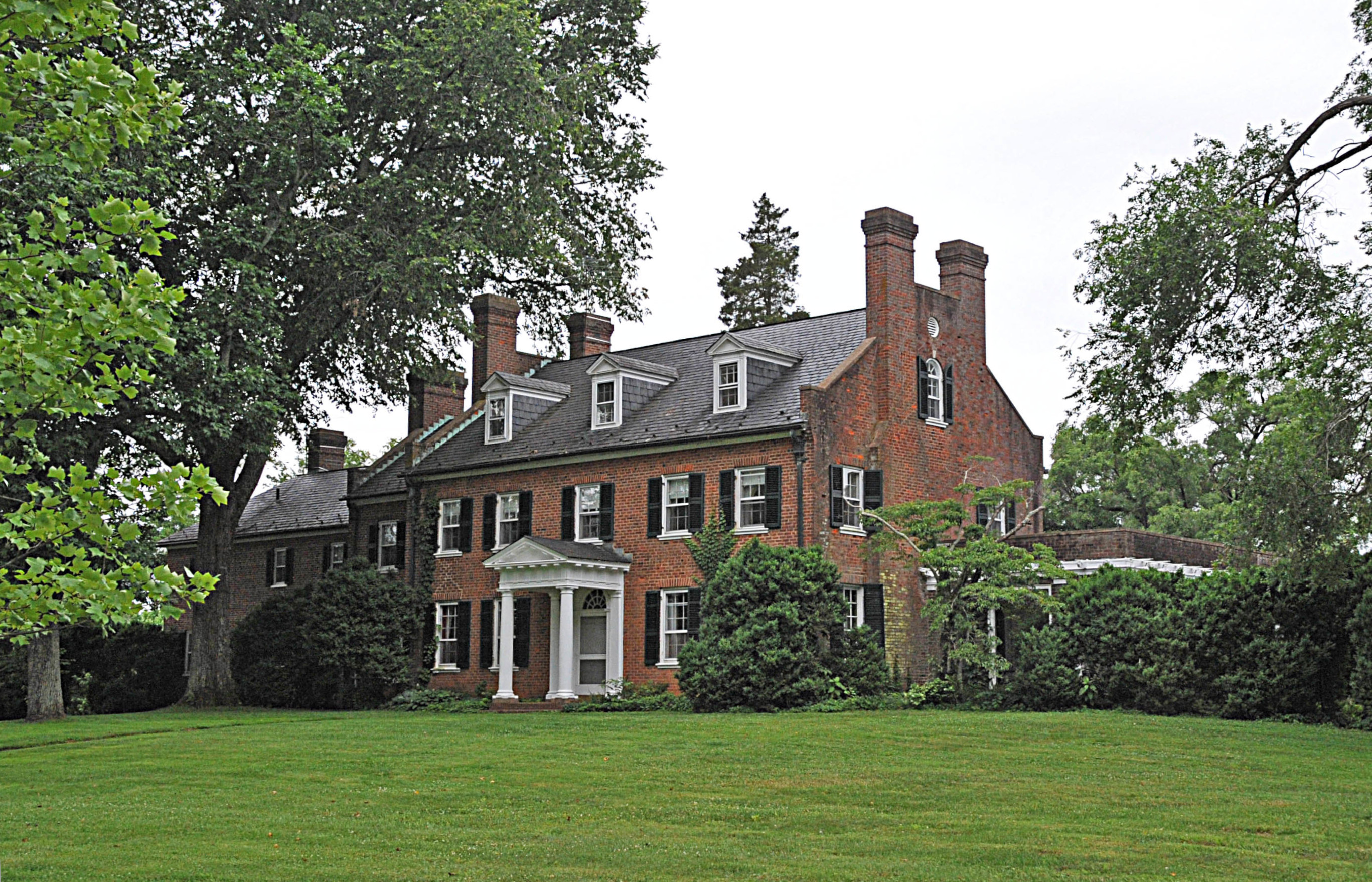

- Location within Northern Virginia Location within Virginia Location within the United States
- Location: 6763 Airlie Rd., near Warrenton, Virginia
- Coordinates: 38°45′10″N 77°47′16″W
- Area: 168.4 acres (68.1 ha)
- Built: 1855
- Architect: Fleming, W.H. Irwin; et al.
- Architectural style: Colonial Revival, Federal Revival
- NRHP reference No.: 09000120
- VLR No.: 030-0085

Significant dates
- Added to NRHP: March 10, 2009
- Designated VLR: December 18, 2008

Hopefield, also known as Brick House Place and Chestnut Grove, is a historic home located near Warrenton, Fauquier County, Virginia. The house was originally constructed around 1855 in the late Federal style. The mansion was altered in 1924, making it an unusual local example of the asymmetrical Colonial Revival style. Contributing resources include a brick summer kitchen (c. 1855); a stone walled well (c. 1855), an icehouse with an iron door (c. 1855); timber-framed, multi-purpose, drive-in crib barn (c. 1855); and the beginnings of the designed landscape that evolved with Colonial Revival-style characteristics in the early-20th century. The pump house, built within a stone ha-ha wall, and the swimming pool date to 1924. A brick four-car garage and a tenant house for staff were constructed between 1928 and 1950 in the Colonial Revival-style. A house ruin on Cedar Run (c. 1890) joins the landscape as a contributing site.

It was listed on the National Register of Historic Places in 2009.
