= Waverly (Middleburg, Virginia) =

Historic house in Virginia, United States

- U.S. National Register of Historic Places
- Virginia Landmarks Register
- Location within Northern Virginia Location within Virginia Location within the United States
- Location: South of Middleburg on VA 626, near Middleburg, Virginia
- Coordinates: 38°55′50″N 77°44′40″W
- Area: 4 acres (1.6 ha)
- Built: c. 1790, c. 1830, c. 1850
- Architect: Adler, David
- Architectural style: Gothic Revival
- NRHP reference No.: 79003040
- VLR No.: 030-0226

Significant dates
- Added to NRHP: March 26, 1979
- Designated VLR: September 19, 1978

Waverly, also known as Waverley, is a historic house located near Middleburg, Fauquier County, Virginia. The original section was built about 1790, and later enlarged about 1830, and enlarged and remodeled in the 1850s. It is a single-pile, center-hall, two-story dwelling, a typical example of an I-house. It has a long, two-story rear ell and has Gothic Revival style decorative detailing. The front facade features a full-width two-story portico with six square piers supporting a flat roof with a plain wooden parapet. The house was renovated after 1940 by architect David Adler.

It was listed on the National Register of Historic Places in 1979.

Peyton House, built during 1831–34 in Raymond, Mississippi, appears to have been modeled upon Waverly.
