= Burrland Farm Historic District =

Place in Virginia, USA

- U.S. National Register of Historic Places
- U.S. Historic district
- Virginia Landmarks Register
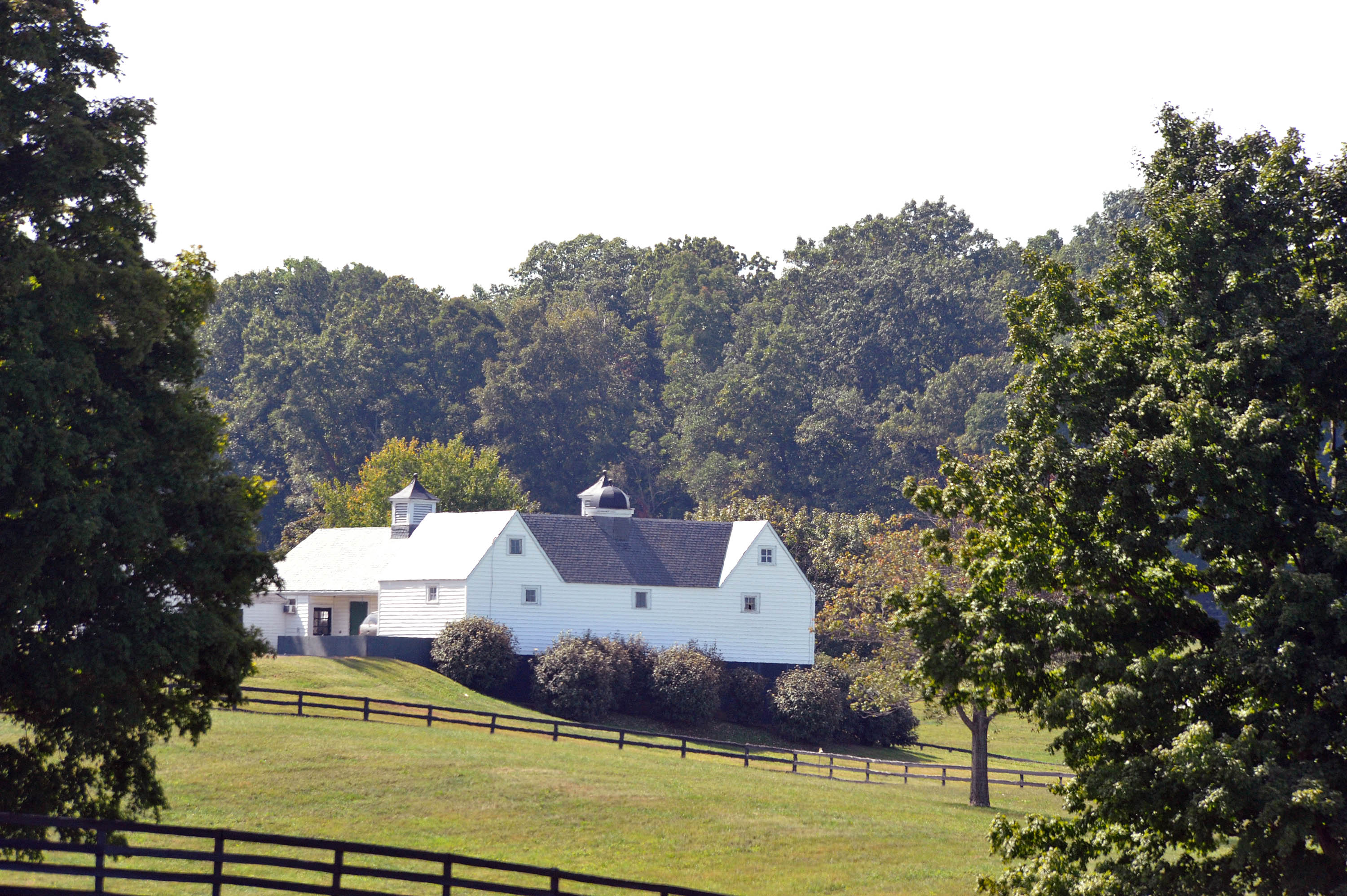

- Location within Northern Virginia Location within Virginia Location within the United States
- Location: Burrland Ln., near Middleburg, Virginia
- Coordinates: 38°56′37″N 77°45′22″W
- Area: 458 acres (185 ha)
- Built: c. 1927-1932
- Architect: Bottomley, William Lawrence
- Architectural style: Georgian Revival
- NRHP reference No.: 97001406
- VLR No.: 030-1017

Significant dates
- Added to NRHP: November 7, 1997
- Designated VLR: July 2, 1997

Burrland Farm Historic District is a historic home and farm complex and national historic district located near Middleburg, Fauquier County, Virginia. The district encompasses 22 contributing buildings, 2 contributing sites, 14 contributing structures, and 1 contributing object on a 458-acre thoroughbred horse breeding and training farm. The buildings were built between 1927 and 1932, and include a Georgian Revival style training barn, a polo barn, a stallion barn, two broodmare barns, a yearling barn, a field shed, an equipment shed, a farm manager's house / office, a trainer's cottage, a mess hall quarters, a foreman's dwelling, three mash houses, five garages, a pumphouse, and a feed and storage warehouse. The contributing structures include a silo, a springhouse, three loading chutes, two teasing chutes, two rings, three run-in sheds, one sun hut and an entrance gate. The original Burrland house was built in 1879 and expanded in 1927 for William Ziegler Jr. by architect William Lawrence Bottomley. Ziegler sold the property in 1955 to Eleonora Sears, who "deliberately gutted and burned [the mansion] down" in 1961. She then sold the farm in 1966.

It was listed on the National Register of Historic Places in 1997.
