= Delaplane =

Delaplane may refer to:

== People ==
- Gaston Delaplane (1882–1977), French rower and cyclist
- Julien Delaplane (born 1995), New Caledonian tennis player
- Sam Delaplane (born 1995), American baseball player
- Stanton Delaplane (1907–1988), American travel writer
- Theodore C. Delaplane (died 1900), American politician from Maryland

== Places ==
- Delaplane, Virginia, village in Fauquier County, Virginia
- Delaplane Historic District, historic district in Delaplane, Virginia
- Delaplane McDaniel House, historic home in Kent County, Delaware
