= American Battlefield Trust =

Nonprofit preserving battlefields

- Founded: 1987
- Tax ID no.: 54-1426643
- Purpose: Saving American battlefields of the American Revolutionary War, the War of 1812, and the American Civil War.
- Location: Washington, D.C., U.S.
- Region served: United States
- Method: Land preservation
- Members: 55,000
- Key people: David N. Duncan (President)
- Revenue: $31,187,669 (FYE 03/2024)
- Website: www.battlefields.org

The American Battlefield Trust is a charitable organization (501(c)(3)) whose primary focus is in the preservation of battlefields of the Revolutionary War, the War of 1812, and the American Civil War, through the acquisition of battlefield land. The American Battlefield Trust was formerly known as the Civil War Trust. On May 8, 2018, the organization announced the creation of the American Battlefield Trust as the umbrella organization for two divisions, the Civil War Trust and the Revolutionary War Trust, which was formerly known as "Campaign 1776".

The American Battlefield Trust also promotes educational programs and heritage tourism initiatives to inform the public about these three conflicts and their significance in American history. On May 31, 2018, the Trust announced that with the acquisition of 13 acres (5.3 ha) at the Cedar Creek battlefield in the Shenandoah Valley of Virginia, it had reached the milestone of 50,000 acres (200 km^{2}) of battlefield land acquired and preserved. Since 1987, the Trust and its federal, state, and local partners have preserved land in 25 states at more than 160 battlefields of the American Revolutionary War, the War of 1812, and the American Civil War. More than 10,000 acres (4,000 ha) were acquired and preserved from 2014 to 2018. As of July 2025, the total land saved exceeded 60,000 acres (240 km^{2}).

== History ==
The organization was originally founded in 1987 as the Association for the Preservation of Civil War Sites (APCWS), to save Civil War battlefield land. APCWS acquired thousands of acres of battlefield land as well as offering educational tours and seminars with prominent historians.

The original Civil War Trust, a second non-profit focused on preserving Civil War battlefields, was formed in 1991. The Civil War Trust helped acquire and preserve 6,700 acres (27 km^{2}) of land in the eight years of its existence and conducted education and heritage tourism programs to educate the public about the significance of the war and of battlefield preservation.

The current organization was created on November 19, 1999, through the merger of the Association for the Preservation of Civil War Sites (APCWS) and the Civil War Trust. The merged organization was originally named the Civil War Preservation Trust. The merger, unanimously approved by the boards of both predecessor groups, streamlined efforts to protect America's most endangered parcels of Civil War history by acquisition of battlefield lands. On January 11, 2011, the Civil War Preservation Trust shortened its name to the Civil War Trust, and added a new logo.

On November 11, 2014 (Veterans Day), the Trust partnered with the Society of the Cincinnati to launch "Campaign 1776", a subsidiary project designed to protect endangered battlefields from the American Revolutionary War and the War of 1812 by acquiring battlefield lands. Federal matching grants for this program were enacted by Congress in December 2014. On May 8, 2018, the organization's name was changed to the American Battlefield Trust to reflect its expanded mission to include land preservation not only of Civil War battlefields, but also the battlefields of the American Revolution and the War of 1812.

The president of the American Battlefield Trust is David N. Duncan, the organization's longtime former Chief Development Officer, who was appointed to the top position by the Board of Trustees effective October 1, 2020, upon the retirement of O. James Lighthizer. Duncan became the Trust's chief fundraiser after his hiring in March 2000 and helped raise more than $240 million during his two decades in that position. A native of Virginia, Duncan is a graduate of James Madison University and was a political fund raiser for a direct mail company before joining the Trust. Lighthizer served as president of the Trust for more than 20 years, taking charge upon the merger of the two predecessor organizations in November 1999. A former member of the Maryland General Assembly and former county executive of Anne Arundel County, Maryland, Lighthizer also served as Maryland Secretary of Transportation from 1991 to 1995, where he pioneered the concept of using Transportation Enhancement highway funds to protect thousands of acres of Civil War battlefield land in Maryland through acquisitions or easements. On January 13, 2021, Lighthizer was awarded the National Humanities Medal by President Donald J. Trump in a ceremony at the White House for his work in battlefield preservation.

Since its formation, the Trust has grown to nearly 200,000 members and supporters and has permanently preserved more than 60,000 acres of American battlefield land from the Civil War, the Revolutionary War and the War of 1812.

== Preservation methods ==
The American Battlefield Trust is a membership-driven organization that uses donated funds to protect battlefield land from the Civil War, the Revolutionary War and the War of 1812. Land is acquired by the American Battlefield Trust from private sector parties at fair market value or by donation. Once land is acquired, the Trust is responsible for land stewardship and interpretation, often with assistance from local governments and other preservation groups.

In cases where a landowner wants to retain ownership the Trust can arrange a conservation easement to protect their property. Conservation easements prohibit development of property, conserving it in its present state.

In its effort to protect American battlefields, the American Battlefield Trust attempts to leverage federal and state programs designed to foster preservation of historic and natural resources. The primary source of federal support for the preservation of Civil War battlefields is the Civil War Battlefield Preservation Program (CWBPP), administered by the American Battlefield Protection Program (ABPP), an office of the National Park Service. CWBPP is designed to promote the preservation of significant Civil War battlefields by offering competitive matching grants for qualifying preservation opportunities. Other federal sources include the Transportation Enhancement program and the Farm and Ranch Protection Program. The American Battlefield Trust has also leveraged funds made available by state and local governments.

== Battlefield preservation ==
The American Battlefield Trust has preserved more than 60,000 acres (240 km^{2}) of battlefield land from the Civil War, the Revolutionary War and the War of 1812 at more than 160 battlefields in 25 states within the United States.

Key battlefield preservation initiatives and acquisitions include:

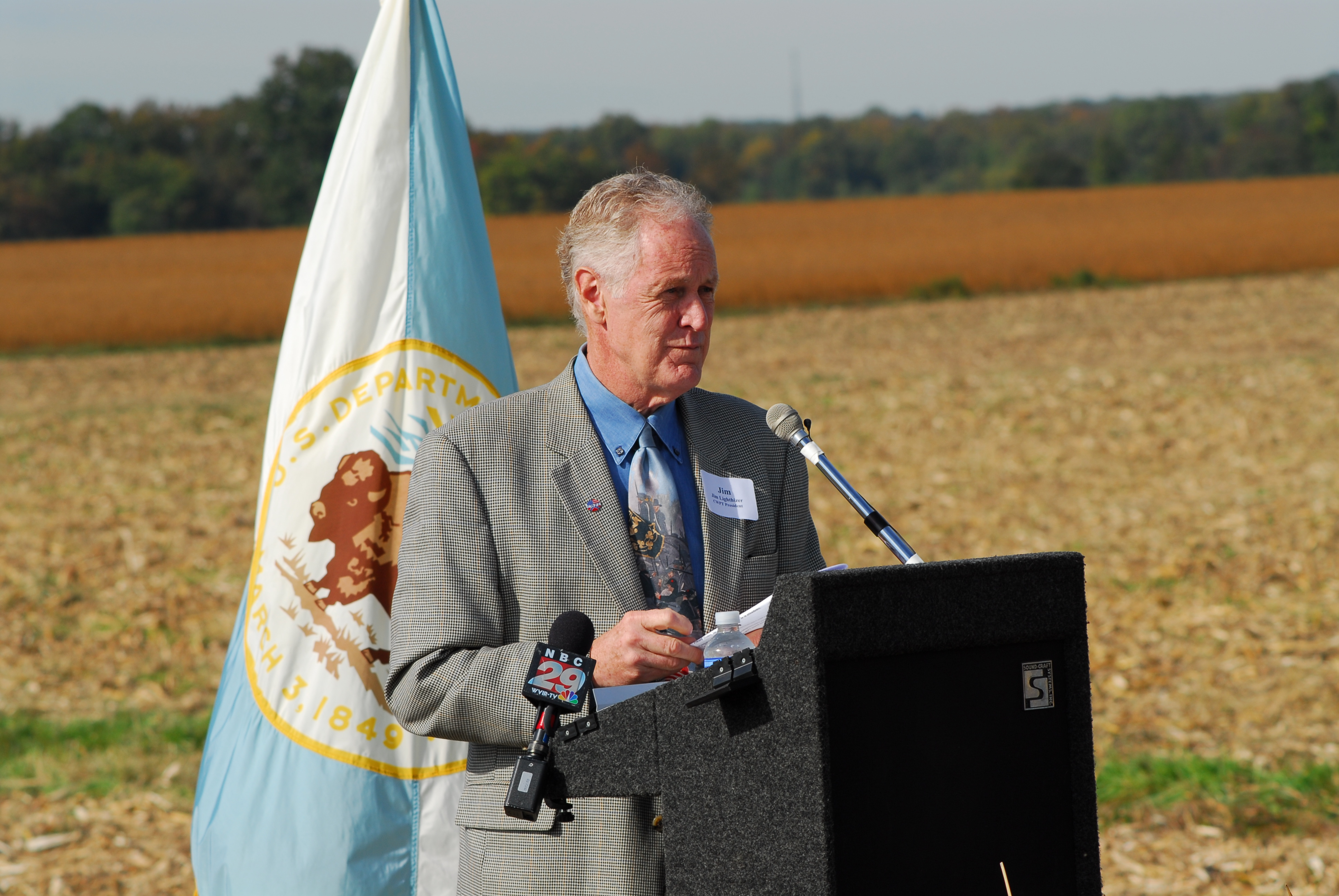
Jim Lighthizer at Slaughter Pen Farm

- 259 acres (1.05 km^{2}) at Fredericksburg, Virginia

The campaign to preserve the 208-acre (0.84 km^{2}) Slaughter Pen Farm is the most expensive private battlefield preservation effort in American history. The Trust, working in partnership with Tricord, Inc., SunTrust Bank, and the Central Virginia Battlefield Trust, was able to purchase the property for $12 million in 2006. To support the preservation efforts at the Slaughter Pen Farm the Department of the Interior awarded a $2 million CWBPP grant based on the significance of the land and the availability of non-federal matching funds. The Slaughter Pen Farm was the largest remaining unprotected part of the Fredericksburg Battlefield. It is also the only place on the battlefield where a visitor can still follow the Union assault from beginning to end.

- 259 acres (1.05 km^{2}) at The Wilderness, Virginia

In October 2010, the Trust announced a new campaign to acquire 49 acres (0.20 km^{2}) of the Wilderness Battlefield in Orange County, Virginia. This Middlebrook Tract includes the eastern edge of Saunders Field and land associated with the May 6, 1864, flank attack by Confederate forces under John B. Gordon. Historian and author Gordon Rhea stated that this land "witnessed some of the Wilderness' most brutal combat". After reaching its $1,085,000 fundraising goal in under three months, the Trust acted as a steward for the land until May 2014, when it was transferred to Fredericksburg and Spotsylvania National Military Park. Building on this acquisition, the Trust in 2011 was also able to secure a 49-acre (0.20 km^{2}) parcel that was the site of Union commander Ulysses S. Grant's daytime headquarters during the fighting.

- 654 acres (2.65 km^{2}) at The Liberty Trail, South Carolina

In October 2019, the Trust joined with its South Carolina partners and the National Park Service to announce a new initiative to create and promote the Liberty Trail, a heritage tourism and preservation initiative to promote South Carolina's crucial role in winning the Revolutionary War. The trail will link more than 70 Revolutionary War battlefields and sites in South Carolina on a driving tour that will stretch from the Appalachian Mountains to the Low Country. The program also aims to acquire and preserve more than 2,500 acres at the state's many battlefields. By mid-2021, the Trust and its partners had already saved 654 acres (2.65 km^{2}) at seven South Carolina battlefields: Waxhaws, Hanging Rock, Camden, Eutaw Springs, Fort Fair Lawn, Parker's Ferry and Port Royal Island.

- 726 acres (2.94 km^{2}) at Glendale, Virginia

While the Richmond, Virginia, suburbs remain a prime area for development, the Trust has made significant acquisitions at the Glendale battlefield, preserving 319 acres (1.29 km^{2}) in 2007 and 675 acres (2.73 km^{2}) overall. Over 80 percent of the battlefield is now preserved. When combined with previous efforts at nearby Malvern Hill, the Trust has now created a three-mile-long (5 km) continuous corridor of protected battlefield.

- 87 acres (0.35 km^{2}) at New Market Heights, Virginia

Although often overshadowed by the many other Civil War battlefields in the Richmond area, the Battle of New Market Heights or Chaffin's Farm on September 29, 1864, inflicted more than 5,000 casualties and featured furious assaults on Confederate lines by Union soldiers in the ranks of the United States Colored Troops. The bravery and sacrifice of the black troops earned them respect on both sides and led to 14 black soldiers being awarded the Medal of Honor. As of mid-2021, the Trust had preserved 87 acres (0.35 km^{2}).

- 868 acres (3.51 km^{2}) at Champion Hill, Mississippi

Using an easement rather than acquiring the land, the Trust protected 144 acres (0.58 km^{2}) at the heart of the Champion Hill battlefield in 2007. This key portion of the field is still owned by the Champion family, for whom the area and the battle were named, but now is under conservation easement. The Champion family will maintain ownership of their historic land while realizing their intention of seeing it protected in perpetuity.

- 1,400 acres (5.7 km^{2}) at Shiloh, Tennessee

As the United States marked the 150th anniversary of the Battle of Shiloh, the Trust announced it had the opportunity to purchase a 504-acre (2.04 km^{2}) property on and around Shiloh Hill, including significant frontage on the Tennessee River. After completing a $1.25 million fundraising campaign, the Trust deeded the land to Shiloh National Military Park, the largest addition to the park since it was founded in 1894. Cumulatively, the Trust has protected 1,160 acres (4.7 km^{2}) at Shiloh, much of which has been integrated into the national park.

- 1,322 acres (5.35 km^{2}) at Chancellorsville, Virginia

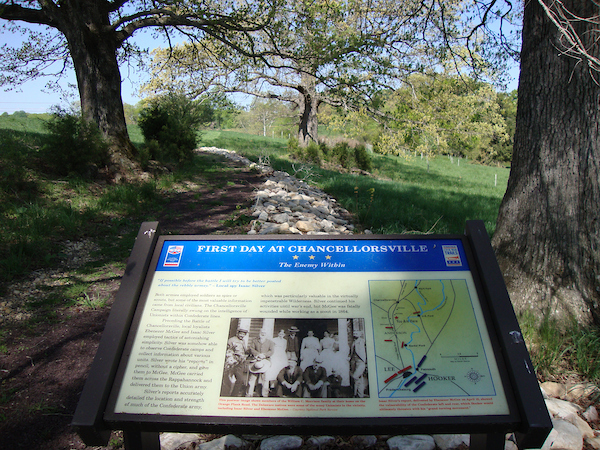
Civil War Trails sign providing visitors information on the Chancellorsville Battlefield

The Trust has a record of working with preservation-friendly developers to protect battlefield land. In 2004, the Trust worked with Spotsylvania County officials and family-owned Tricord, Inc., to protect 134 acres (0.54 km^{2}) of land associated with the First Day at Chancellorsville Battlefield. Two years later, a similar deal was worked out with Spotsylvania County and Toll Brothers, Inc. to protect another 74 acres (0.30 km^{2}) of this historic battleground. Because of these efforts, more than 2 miles (3.2 km) of contiguous battlefield land along the historic Orange Turnpike have been preserved. In addition to its efforts at the First Day at Chancellorsville site, the Trust has helped protect more than 1,000 acres (4.0 km^{2}) at other places of the battlefield, including more than 85 acres (0.34 km^{2}) on the site of Stonewall Jackson's famous flank attack.

- 1,231 acres (4.98 km^{2}) at Gettysburg, Pennsylvania

The Trust has been an active participant in a variety of projects at the Gettysburg Battlefield, leading to the protection of 943 acres (3.82 km^{2}). In July 2014, the Trust announced one of the most ambitious projects in its history: a $5.5 million national fundraising campaign to acquire a 4.14-acre (0.0168 km^{2}) site that witnessed some of the heaviest fighting of July 1, 1863, and includes the Mary Thompson house, where Gen. Robert E. Lee made his headquarters during the battle. Previous high-profile projects at Gettysburg in which the Trust was involved include the purchase of the 145-acre (0.59 km^{2}) Daniel Lady Farm and the former Gettysburg Country Club, 95 acres (0.38 km^{2}). The organization has also saved land associated with strategic cavalry actions: 283 acres (1.15 km^{2}) at East Cavalry Field and 114 acres (0.46 km^{2}) at Fairfield. A number of other transactions, while small individually, have made a visible difference in the status of preservation at the park, as they have allowed for landscape restoration at critical vistas.

- 876 acres (3.55 km^{2}) at North Anna, Virginia
- 1,867 acres (7.56 km^{2}) at Bentonville, North Carolina
- 369 acres (1.49 km^{2}) at Fort Donelson, Tennessee
- 1,441 acres (5.83 km^{2}) at Malvern Hill, Virginia
- 542 acres (2.19 km^{2}) at Harpers Ferry, West Virginia
- 2,159 acres (8.74 km^{2}) at Brandy Station, Virginia
- 2,443 acres (9.89 km^{2}) at Trevilian Station, Virginia
- 116 acres (0.47 km^{2}) at Brandywine (Revolutionary War), Pennsylvania
- 49 acres (0.20 km^{2}) at Yorktown (Revolutionary War and Civil War), Virginia
- 25 acres (0.10 km^{2}) at Sackets Harbor, (War of 1812) New York

As of mid-2021, the American Battlefield Trust has preserved over 53,000 acres (210 km^{2}) at more than 145 battlefields in 24 states at the following sites:

- Alabama: Fort Blakely, Hog Mountain, Magee Farm, Day's Gap
- Arkansas: Devil's Backbone, Elkin's Ferry, Helena, Prairie Grove, Prairie D'Ane
- Colorado: Sand Creek
- Florida: Natural Bridge
- Georgia: Chickamauga, Dallas, Griswoldville, Kennesaw Mountain, New Hope Church, Resaca, Rocky Face Ridge, Kettle Creek (Revolutionary War)
- Kansas: Mine Creek
- Kentucky: Camp Wildcat, Mill Springs, Munfordville, Perryville, Richmond, Camp Nelson
- Louisiana: Fort DeRussy, Mansfield, Port Hudson
- Maryland: Antietam, Falling Waters, Monocacy, South Mountain
- Massachusetts: Lexington and Concord (Revolutionary War), Boston.
- Minnesota: Wood Lake
- Mississippi: Big Black River Bridge, Brice's Cross Roads, Champion Hill, Corinth, Iuka, Okolona, Port Gibson, Raymond, Tupelo, Vicksburg
- Missouri: Byram's Ford, Fort Davidson, Newtonia, Wilson's Creek, Carthage
- New Jersey: Princeton (Revolutionary War)
- New Mexico: Glorieta Pass
- New York: Bennington (Revolutionary War), Fort Ann (Revolutionary War), Newtown (Revolutionary War), Sackets Harbor (War of 1812), Saratoga (Revolutionary War)
- North Carolina: Averasboro, Bentonville, New Bern, Wyse Fork
- Oklahoma: Cabin Creek, Honey Springs
- Pennsylvania: Gettysburg, Brandywine (Revolutionary War)
- South Carolina: Camden (Revolutionary War), Charleston (Revolutionary War), Eutaw Springs (Revolutionary War), Hanging Rock (Revolutionary War), Morris Island, Parker's Ferry (Revolutionary War), Port Royal Island (Revolutionary War), Waxhaws (Revolutionary War)
- Tennessee: Chattanooga, Davis Bridge, Fort Donelson, Fort Sanders, Franklin, Jackson, Johnsonville, Parker's Cross Roads, Shiloh/Fallen Timbers, Spring Hill, Stones River
- Texas: Palmito Ranch
- Virginia: Aldie, Appomattox Courthouse, Appomattox Station, Ball's Bluff, Brandy Station, Bristoe Station, Buckland Mills, Cedar Creek, Cedar Mountain, Chancellorsville, Cold Harbor, Cool Spring, Cross Keys, First Deep Bottom, Second Deep Bottom, First Kernstown, Fisher's Hill, Five Forks, Fort Harrison, Fredericksburg, Gaines's Mill, Glendale, Hatcher's Run, High Bridge, J.E.B. Stuart's Birthplace, Kelly's Ford, Lee's Mill, Malvern Hill, Manassas, McDowell, Middleburg, Mine Run, New Market, New Market Heights, North Anna, Petersburg (A.P. Hill death site), Petersburg (Peebles' Farm), Petersburg (The Breakthrough), Port Republic, Rappahannock Station, Ream's Station, Sailor's Creek, Saltville, Second Winchester, Spotsylvania Courthouse, Stafford Civil War Park, Third Winchester, Thoroughfare Gap, Tom's Brook, Totopotomoy Creek, Trevilian Station, Upperville, Ware Bottom Church, White Oak Road, Wilderness, Williamsburg
- West Virginia: Corrick's Ford, Fort Mulligan, Greenbrier, Harpers Ferry, Rich Mountain, Shepherdstown, Summit Point

== Preservation initiatives ==
To further its aim of preserving American Civil War battlefields, the Trust has engaged in grassroots and community outreach efforts and had conducted campaigns against development projects that have threatened battlefields.

=== Princeton Battlefield ===
In May 2018, the American Battlefield Trust purchased 14.85 acres of "Maxwell's Field" on the Princeton Battlefield, where George Washington personally led a counterattack against British troops on the morning of January 3, 1777. The $4 million acquisition was made with the Institute for Advanced Study (IAS), which owned the land and had planned to develop the property with a mix of 15 single-family homes and town homes to increase faculty housing. To fight the proposed development, the Trust created the Save Princeton Coalition, which included the Trust's "Campaign 1776" division, the American Association for State and Local History, the American Revolution Institute of the Society of the Cincinnati, the National Coalition for History, the National Trust for Historic Preservation, the Princeton Battlefield Society, the New Jersey Chapter of the Sierra Club, and the National Parks Conservation Association.

The 14.85-acre parcel, which is adjacent to the current Princeton Battlefield State Park, constitutes about of two-thirds of Maxwell's Field. Although the IAS brought in heavy equipment and began to remove trees, it participated in negotiations with the coalition and in December 2016 reached a breakthrough agreement that preserved most of the site of Washington's charge while clearing the way for the IAS to build 16 town homes on its remaining acreage. The Trust and the IAS have further committed to restore the battlefield site, which will ultimately be conveyed to the State of New Jersey and added to the contiguous state park. Washington's victory at Princeton ended a 10-day campaign that began with the Crossing of the Delaware and the surprise attack on the Hessian troops at Trenton, N.J. It was a turning point in the Revolutionary War.

=== No Casino Gettysburg ===
The Gettysburg Battlefield has faced two separate threats from proposed casinos.

In 2005 a proposal was put forward to build a casino with 3,000 slot machines less than a mile from the Gettysburg Battlefield. Soon after the proposal was announced, the Civil War Trust joined forces with a local concerned citizens group called No Casino Gettysburg to advocate against the proposal. Later, the Trust formed the Stop the Slots Coalition, a collection of national and local groups opposed to the casino.

On December 20, 2006, the Pennsylvania Gaming Control Board voted to reject the Gettysburg casino proposal.

In 2010, a new Gettysburg Casino application was filed and the Trust, with a broad coalition of partners, undertook a successful campaign to prevent approval of this new application. Nearly 300 prominent historians wrote to the Pennsylvania Gaming Board, urging the rejection of the application. Susan Eisenhower, Emmy award-winning filmmaker Ken Burns, two-time Pulitzer Prize-winning author David McCullough, Medal of Honor recipient Paul William Bucha, composer John Williams, and actors Matthew Broderick, Stephen Lang (actor), and Sam Waterston were all featured in a Jeff Griffiths produced video declaring their opposition to the proposed Gettysburg casino.

On April 14, 2011, the Pennsylvania Gaming Control Board voted to reject this second proposal to bring casino gambling to the doorstep of Gettysburg National Military Park.

=== Chancellorsville rezoning ===
In May 2002, a regional developer announced a plan to build 2,300 houses and 2,000,000 square feet (190,000 m^{2}) of commercial space on the 790-acre (3.2 km^{2}) Mullins Farm, site of the first day of fighting at the Battle of Chancellorsville. Soon thereafter, the Civil War Trust formed the Coalition to Save Chancellorsville, a network of national and local preservation groups, that waged a vocal campaign against the development.

For nearly a year, the Coalition mobilized local citizens, held candlelight vigils and hearings, and encouraged residents to become more involved in preservation. Public opinion polling conducted by the Coalition found that more than two-thirds of local residents opposed the development. The survey also found that 90 percent of local residents believed their county has a responsibility to protect Chancellorsville and other historic resources.

As a result of these efforts, in March 2003 the Spotsylvania County Board of Supervisors denied the rezoning application that would have allowed for the development of the site. Immediately following the vote, the Civil War Trust and other Coalition members began working to acquire the battlefield. By working with county officials and developers, the Civil War Trust acquired 140 acres (0.57 km^{2}) in 2004 and another 74 acres (0.30 km^{2}) in 2006.

=== Morris Island ===
With the help of the Civil War Trust, the Morris Island Coalition was formed in early 2004 to oppose development on historic Morris Island outside Charleston, South Carolina. Morris Island was the scene of the charge of the 54th Massachusetts Infantry on Fort Wagner, famously depicted in the film Glory.

The Coalition, led by local resident Blake Hallman, generated local government support for preservation of Morris Island. Press reaction was favorable as well, and public opinion polls found that an overwhelming number of Charleston residents wanted to see the barrier island remain undeveloped. Hallman earned the Civil War Trust's "Preservationist of the Year" award for his efforts to save Morris Island.

At one time, development plans called for a 20-unit luxury house development on Cummings Point (the site of Fort Wagner). In early 2005, the landowner tried unsuccessfully to sell the property on eBay. At the end of 2005, a preservation-friendly developer acquired the property. He later agreed to sell it to the Trust for Public Land (TPL) for preservation purposes a few months later.

In 2008, the Trust engaged in fundraising efforts in support of the State of South Carolina, City of Charleston, and the Trust for Public Land's $3m effort that would preserve an additional 117 acres (0.47 km^{2}) of Morris Island.

=== Stop the Wilderness Walmart ===
Together with the Friends of Wilderness Battlefield, the National Trust for Historic Preservation, the Piedmont Environmental Council, the National Parks Conservation Association, Preservation Virginia and a group of concerned local residents, the Civil War Trust opposed the construction of a Walmart Supercenter on the Wilderness Battlefield in Orange County, Virginia. Following a nationwide outcry from preservationists and historians alike, Walmart Stores, Inc. announced in January 2011 that it had "decided to preserve" rather than develop the historic site where local officials had given the company permission to construct its newest superstore in 2009. Pulitzer Prize-winning author and historian James McPherson had identified the site as part of "the nerve center of the Union Army during the Battle of the Wilderness."

Trust President Jim Lighthizer praised Walmart's decision, stating that founder Sam Walton, a veteran of the Second World War, would have been "proud" of his company's move to preserve the hallowed ground. "We stand ready to work with Walmart to put this controversy behind us and protect the battlefield from further encroachment," Lighthizer stated. "We firmly believe that preservation and progress need not be mutually exclusive, and welcome Walmart as a thoughtful partner in efforts to protect the Wilderness Battlefield." In November 2013, Walmart donated the historic site comprising more than 50 acres (0.20 km^{2}) to the Commonwealth of Virginia.

== Educational programs ==
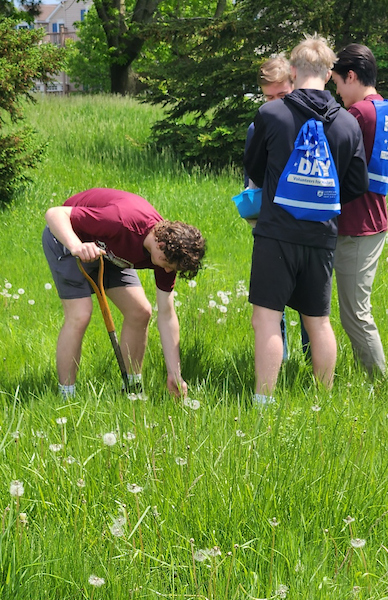
Volunteers help clean up the Sackets Harbor battlefield on Park Day.

In addition to preserving Civil War battlefield land, the American Battlefield Trust conducts programs designed to inform the public about the events and consequences of the Civil War, the Revolutionary War and the War of 1812, create a personal connection to the past and foster an understanding of the need for preservation and how it benefits society.

- battlefields.org – The American Battlefield Trust's web site provides comprehensive educational information about the Civil War, the Revolutionary War and the War of 1812, including scores of battle maps, hundreds of primary sources, free downloadable curricula, photos, 360° panoramic battlefield views and thousands of articles.
- Hallowed Ground – the Trust's quarterly magazine, includes articles on history, preservation techniques and upcoming events.
- Video programs - On its website, on YouTube and on Facebook, the Trust hosts animated battle maps, four-minute summaries of history topics, a "BattlefieldU" section that answers simple questions and hundreds of "Battlefield Live" videos, shot at the places they help preserve.
- American Battlefield Trust Teacher Institute Series – The Trust conducts professional development events, in-person and virtually, featuring teacher workshops and battlefield tours.
- Public Education – The Trust maintains a two-week curriculum for use in classrooms, "Traveling Trunks," a Field Trip fund and more.
- Civil War Battle Apps – The Trust has more than 20 GPS-enabled battlefield touring applications for smartphones and other mobile devices.
- Battlefield Interpretation – The Trust works to interpret many of the battlefields that it saves with wayside exhibits, walking trails, and smartphone GPS-enabled battlefield touring applications.
- Park Day – The American Battlefield Trust sponsors and promotes an annual volunteer clean-up day at battlefield sites throughout the United States.
- Youth Leadership Team – Since 2019, the American Battlefield Trust has annually chosen 15 high school members from around the nation to participate in a wide arrange of preservation initiatives in their hometowns, as well as learning about lobbying, social media, and communication skills to aid in their preservation.

== Organization ==
The American Battlefield Trust is located in Washington, D.C.

The president of the American Battlefield Trust is David N. Duncan, formerly the Trust's Chief Development Officer, who served as the organization's chief fund raiser from March 2000 until taking over as president in October 2020 upon the retirement of O. James Lighthizer, who had led the non-profit since November 1999. In December 1999, Lighthizer accepted the presidency of Civil War Preservation Trust, a new organization created by the merger of two other national battlefield preservation groups, the Civil War Trust and the Association for the Preservation of Civil War Sites. Lighthizer had previously served as a member of the Civil War Trust's Board of Trustees.

When Lighthizer became president at CWPT in 1999, the fledgling organization had 22,000 members and its predecessor organizations had protected 7,500 acres (30 km^{2}) in the previous 13 years. During Lighthizer's tenure as president of the CWPT and the Civil War Trust, the group has added more than 32,500 acres (132 km^{2}) of protected land, and has 200,000 members and supporters nationwide. Lighthizer was also the architect of the 2006 purchase of the 208-acre Slaughter Pen Farm on the Fredericksburg Battlefield. The $12 million acquisition was the most expensive private battlefield preservation effort in American history.

Robert C. Daum is the chairman of the board of trustees of the American Battlefield Trust. A retired investment banker and financial executive, Daum also serves on executive committee and board of the Gilder Lehrman Institute of American History, Sheltering Arms (a New York-based social services agency), the Royal Oak Foundation (the US affiliate of the UK National Trust), and the Visiting Nurse Service of New York. He is the former chair of Out2Play, which built over 100 playgrounds for New York City public schools.

To commemorate the sesquicentennial of the Civil War, in 2011 the Trust began a significant fundraising initiative. By April 2014, the organization had met the initial $40 million fundraising goal of Campaign 150: Our Time, Our Legacy more than a year early, and chose to raise its goal to an unprecedented $50 million. In June 2015, as the Civil War sesquicentennial concluded, the Trust announced that it had met its revised goal and raised a total of $52.5 million during the four-year effort.

== Awards ==
The American Battlefield Trust, formerly The Civil War Trust, has received 11 consecutive 4-Star awards from Charity Navigator and 12 in all covering the years 2007, 2009, 2010, 2011, 2012, 2013, 2014, 2015, 2016, 2017, 2018 and 2019. This award is presented to those charitable organizations that exhibit strong results and financial discipline. The Trust is one of only four Arts, Culture, Humanities institutions in the entire country with 11 or more consecutive 4-star ratings. The others are the New York Public Library, the Georgia Historical Society and the Yerba Buena Center for the Arts.

In 2020, video productions created by the Trust in association with Wide Awake Films earned Silver Medal honors in major international competitions from the Society of Publication Designers and the Telly Awards, showcasing the innovative means available to bring the past alive through this medium.

The Trust received a 2012 accreditation from the Better Business Bureau's Wise Giving Alliance.

The Trust was awarded the "Partner in Conservation Award" by the United States Department of the Interior in 2010.

The Trust's membership magazine, Hallowed Ground, has been honored in the APEX Awards for Publication Excellence each year since 2009.

The Trust's Gettysburg Animated Map, produced by Wide Awake Films, received a 2014 Silver Telly Award in the Online/Historical Programs category.

== See also ==
- American Civil War battlefield preservation
