= Preservation efforts of the Fredericksburg battlefield =

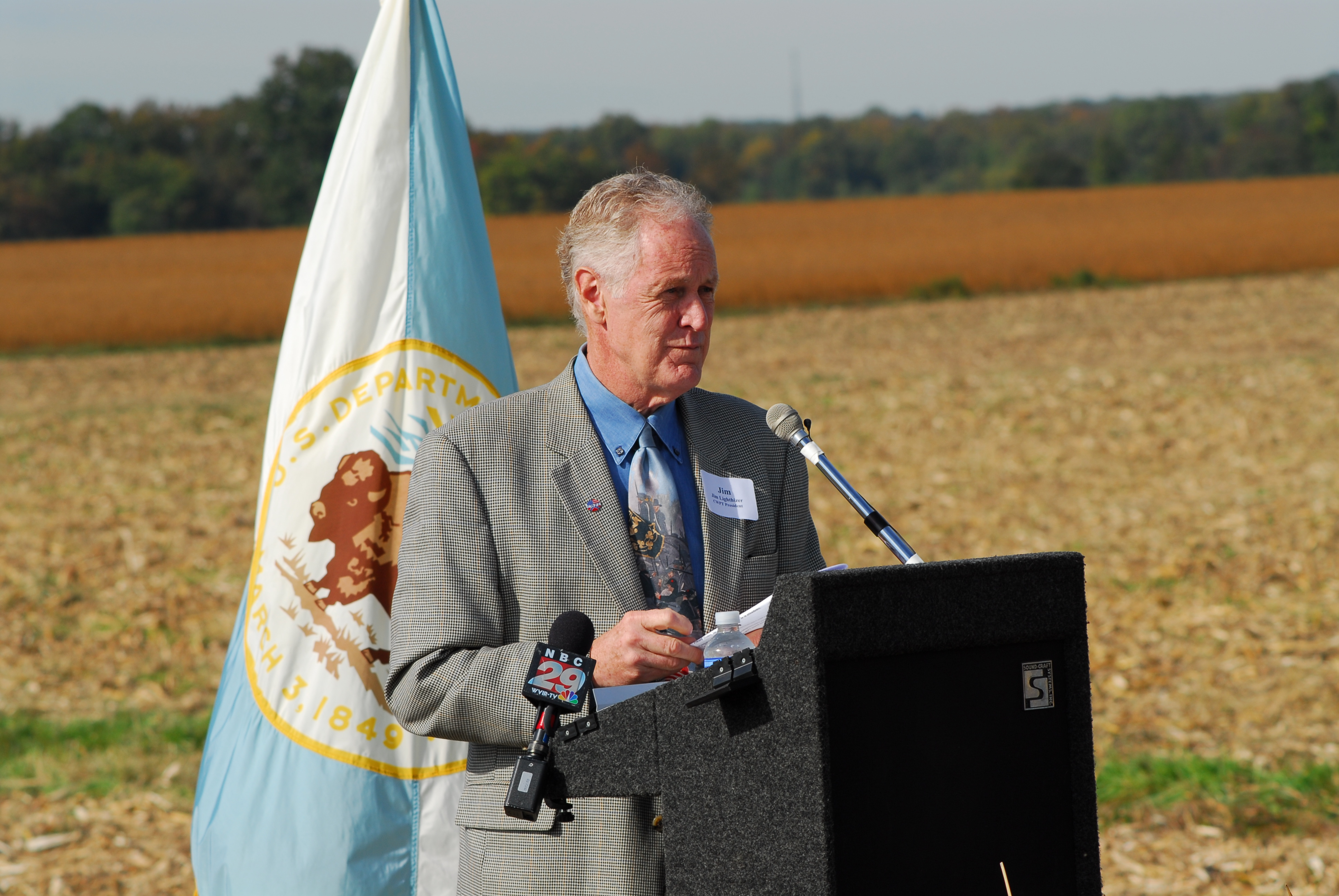
CWPT President Jim Lighthizer at Slaughter Pen Farm

In March 2006, the Civil War Preservation Trust (CWPT) - now the Civil War Trust (a division of the American Battlefield Trust) - announced the beginning of a $12 million national campaign to preserve the historic Slaughter Pen Farm, a key part of the Fredericksburg battlefield, Virginia, United States. The 205-acre (0.83 km^{2}) farm, known locally as the Pierson Tract, was the scene of bloody struggle on December 13, 1862. Over this ground Federal troops under Maj. Gen. George Meade and Brig. Gen. John Gibbon launched their assault against Lt. Gen. Thomas "Stonewall" Jackson's Confederates holding the southern portion of the Army of Northern Virginia's line at the Battle of Fredericksburg. Despite suffering enormous casualties the Federal troops under Meade were able to temporarily penetrate the Confederate line and for a time represented the North's best chance of winning the Battle of Fredericksburg. The fighting on this southern portion of the battlefield, later named the Slaughter Pen, produced 5,000 casualties and five Medal of Honor winners.

The Slaughter Pen Farm was considered to be the largest remaining unprotected part of the Fredericksburg battlefield. It is also the only place on the battlefield where a visitor can still follow the Union assault of December 13 from beginning to end. Nearly all the other land associated with Union attacks at Fredericksburg—either on the southern end of the battlefield or in front of Marye's Heights—has been degraded by development. The $12 million acquisition of the Slaughter Pen Farm at the Fredericksburg battlefield has been called the most ambitious nonprofit battlefield acquisition in American history.

In October 2006 the Department of the Interior awarded a $2 million grant based on the significance of the Slaughter Pen Farm. The money was provided through a U.S. Congressional appropriation from the Land and Water Conservation Fund. The fund supports non-federal efforts to acquire and preserve meaningful American Civil War battlefield lands. The program is administered by the American Battlefield Protection Program, an arm of the National Park Service. In addition, the Central Virginia Battlefields Trust (CVBT) committed $1 million toward the Slaughter Pen Farm fundraising campaign.

In addition to the preservation of Slaughter Pen Farm, the American Battlefield Trust through its Civil War Trust division has made five additional land acquisitions on the Fredericksburg battlefield, preserving an additional 40 acres, for a total of 248 acres (1.00 km^{2}) saved.
