= Magee Farm =

Historic house in Alabama, United States

- Jacob Magee House
- U.S. National Register of Historic Places
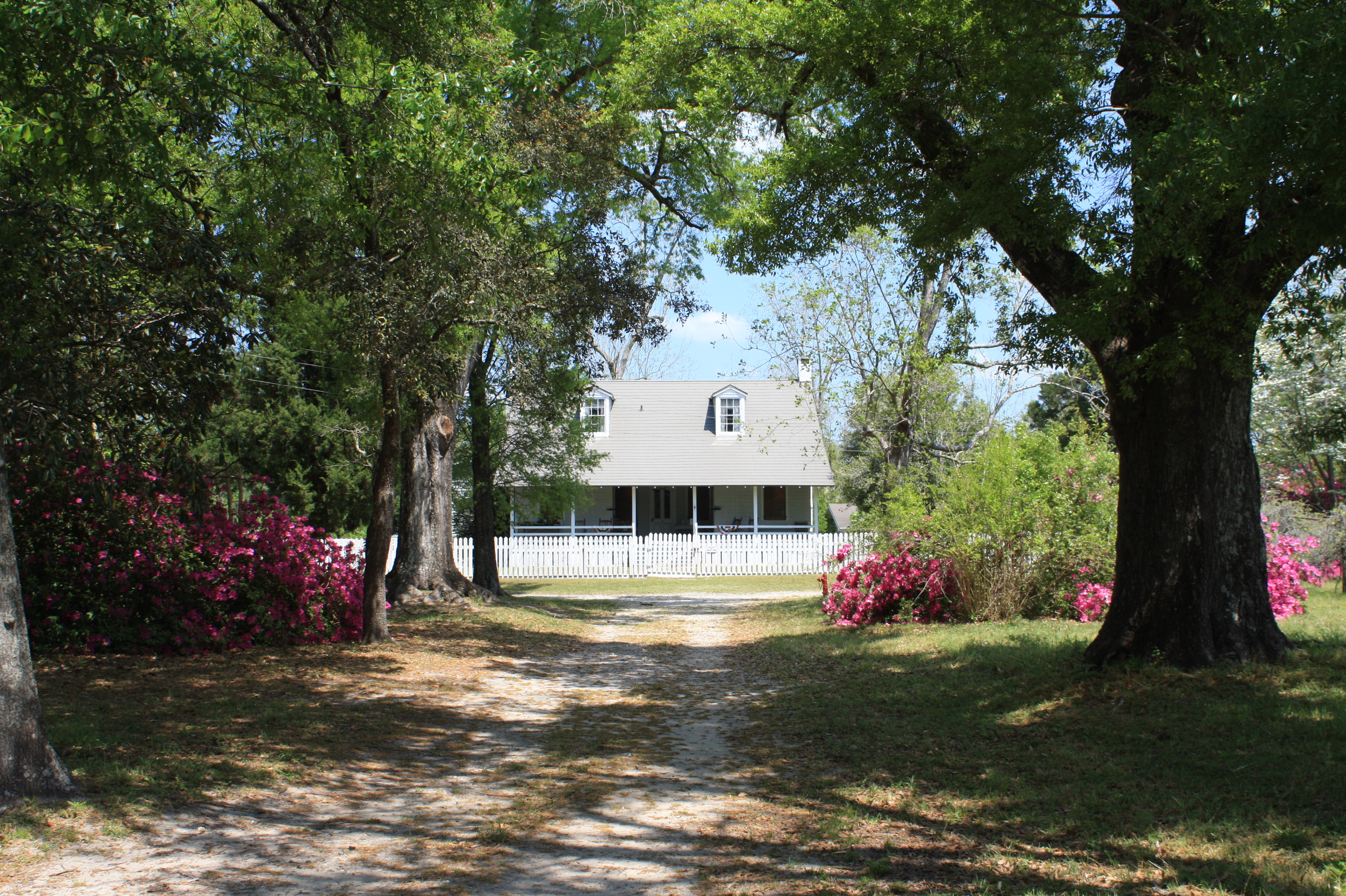
- Jacob Magee House in 2010

- Location within Alabama Location within the United States
- Nearest city: Kushla, Alabama
- Coordinates: 30°49′20″N 88°9′48″W
- Area: less than one acre
- Built: 1848
- Architectural style: Gulf Coast Cottage
- NRHP reference No.: 88000112
- Added to NRHP: February 12, 1988

The Magee Farm, also known as the Jacob Magee House, is a historic residence in Kushla, Alabama, United States. Built by Jacob Magee in 1848, the 1 1/2-story wood-frame structure is an example of the Gulf Coast Cottage style. The house is best known as the site of preliminary arrangements for the surrender of the last Confederate States Army east of the Mississippi River. Confederate General Richard Taylor negotiated a ceasefire with Union General Edward Canby at the house on April 29, 1865. Taylor's forces, comprising 47,000 Confederate troops serving in Alabama, Mississippi and Louisiana, were the last remaining Confederate force east of the Mississippi River. The Magee Farm was placed on the National Register of Historic Places on February 11, 1988. In 2004, partially through the efforts of the Civil War Trust, a division of the American Battlefield Trust, which helped save 12.6 acres of the farm, the house was opened as a museum. It ceased operation as a museum in 2010, due to a lack of public support and declining revenues, and was listed for sale. It was then listed on the Alabama Historical Commission's Places in Peril listing for 2010.

== See also ==
- Battle of Spanish Fort
- Battle of Fort Blakeley
- Mobile, Alabama in the American Civil War
