= Belle Grove (Delaplane, Virginia) =

Historic house in Virginia, United States

- U.S. National Register of Historic Places
- Virginia Landmarks Register
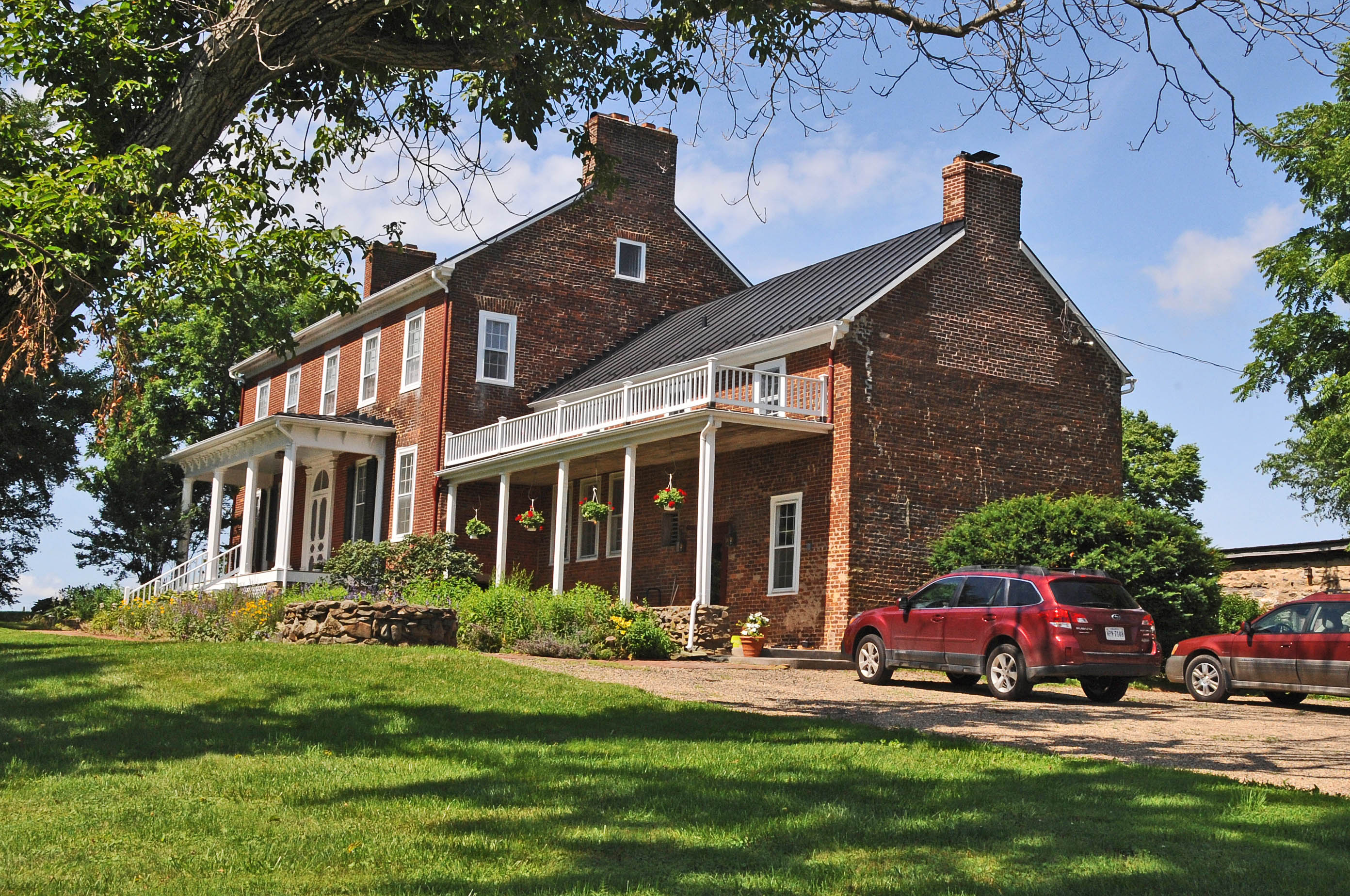

- Location within Northern Virginia Location within Virginia Location within the United States
- Location: 1402 Winchester Rd., near Delaplane, Virginia
- Coordinates: 38°58′51″N 77°57′14″W
- Area: 90.3 acres (36.5 ha)
- Built: c. 1812
- Architectural style: Federal
- NRHP reference No.: 06000756
- VLR No.: 030-0008

Significant dates
- Added to NRHP: August 30, 2006
- Designated VLR: June 8, 2006

Belle Grove is a historic home and farm located near Delaplane, Fauquier County, Virginia. The manor house was built about 1812, and is a 2 1/2-story, five-bay, brick and stuccoed stone house in the Federal style. It has a 1 1/2-story, three-bay summer kitchen, built about 1850, and connected to the main house by a hyphen. Also on the property are the contributing meat house (c. 1812); the barn (c. 1830); a chicken house (c. 1900); a cattle shed (c. 1940); a loafing shed (c. 1940); machine shed (c. 1940); a four-foot square, stone foundation (c. 1812); stone spring house ruin (c. 1812); the Edmonds-Settle-Chappelear Cemetery (1826-1940); an eight-by-twelve-foot stone foundation (c. 1900); a tenant house ruin (c. 1900); a stone well at the manor house (c. 1812); and a loading chute (c. 1940).

It was listed on the National Register of Historic Places in 2006.
