= Paris Historic District =

Historic district in Virginia, United States

- U.S. National Register of Historic Places
- U.S. Historic district
- Virginia Landmarks Register
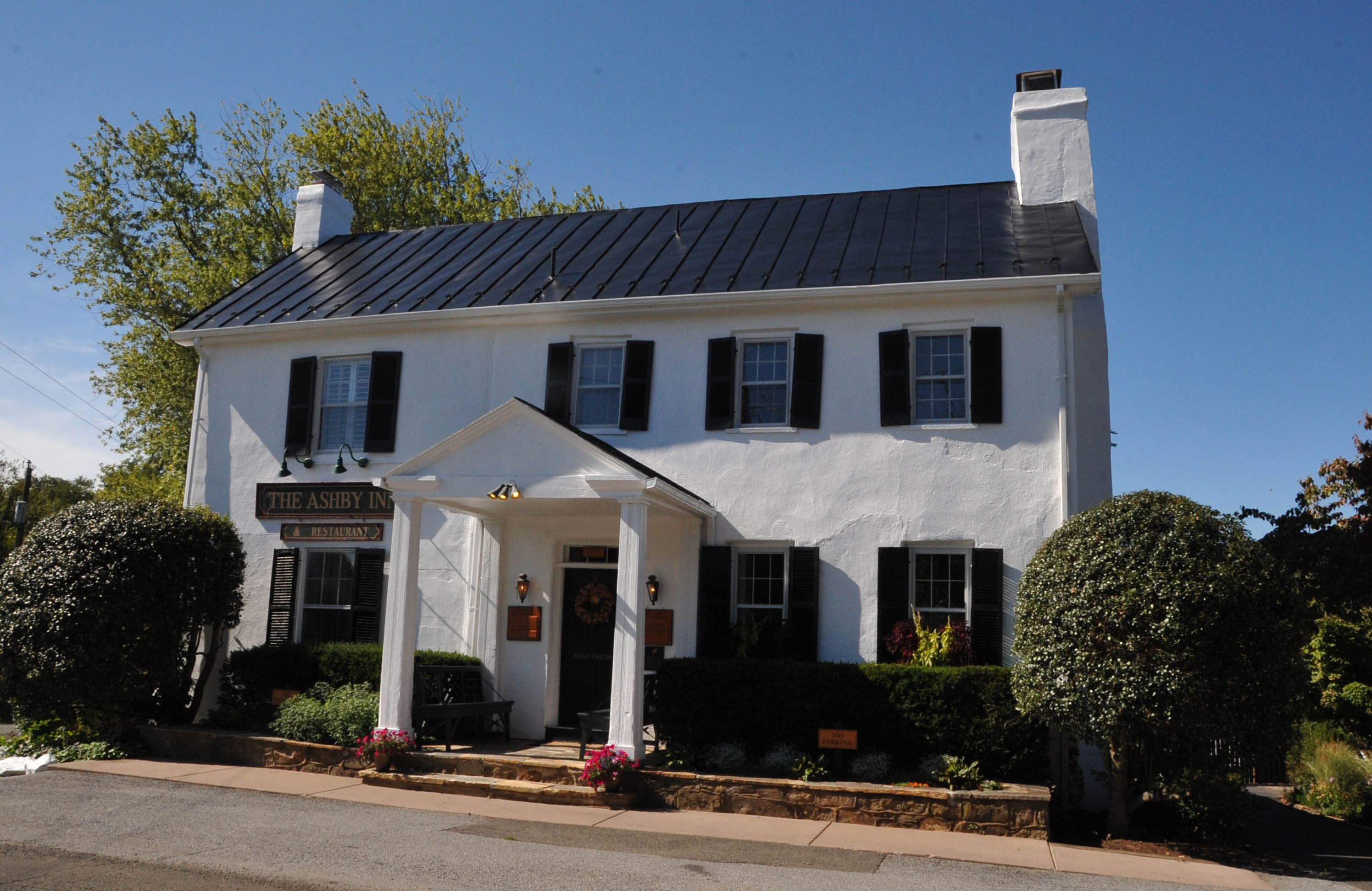
- Ashby Inn

- Location within Northern Virginia Location within Virginia Location within the United States
- Location: Area inc. Federal St. and parts of Republican St. and Gap Run Rd., Paris, Virginia
- Coordinates: 39°00′18″N 77°57′07″W
- Area: less than one acre
- Built: 1786
- Architect: Hanes, Henry S.; Hinson, Ambrose
- Architectural style: Federal, Gothic Revival, et al.
- NRHP reference No.: 07000192
- VLR No.: 030-0222

Significant dates
- Added to NRHP: March 21, 2007
- Designated VLR: March 21, 2007

Paris Historic District is a national historic district located at Paris, Fauquier County, Virginia. It encompasses 53 contributing resources in the rural village of Paris. The district includes primarily residences, although the district also includes some commercial buildings, churches, a former school, and a cemetery. Fifty-two of the 53 contributing resources are already listed as part of the Crooked Run Valley Rural Historic District. Notable buildings include "Wagoner's Stand" (c. 1820), the Josiah Murray House (c. 1820), the William Peck House, Old Paris Meeting House (c. 1830), the Willis-Carr House (c. 1840), the former Rogers Store (c. 1850), and Trinity United Methodist Church (1892).

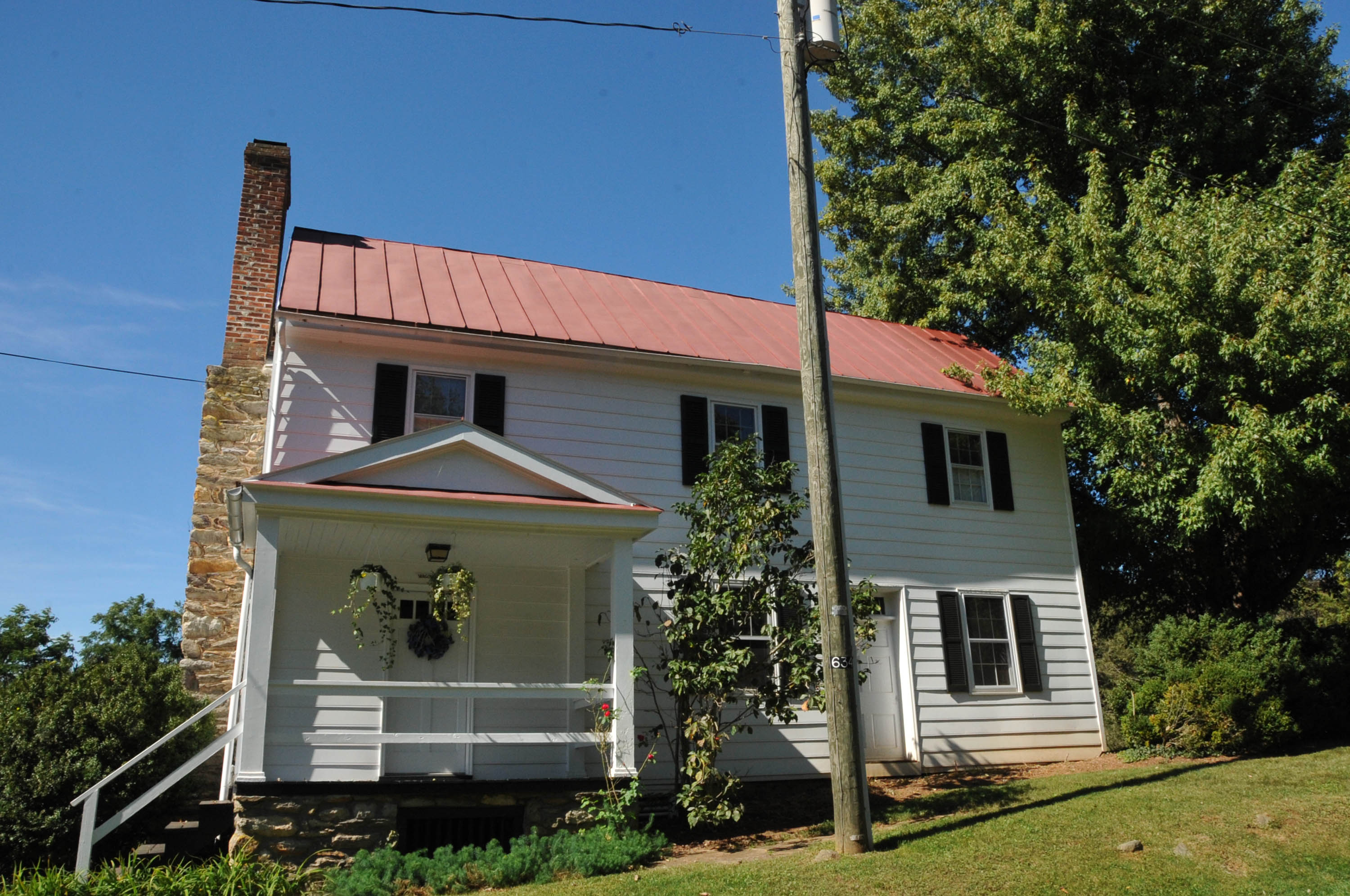
Wagoner's Stand

It was listed on the National Register of Historic Places in 2007.
