= Delaplane Historic District =

Historic district in Virginia, United States

- U.S. National Register of Historic Places
- U.S. Historic district
- Virginia Landmarks Register
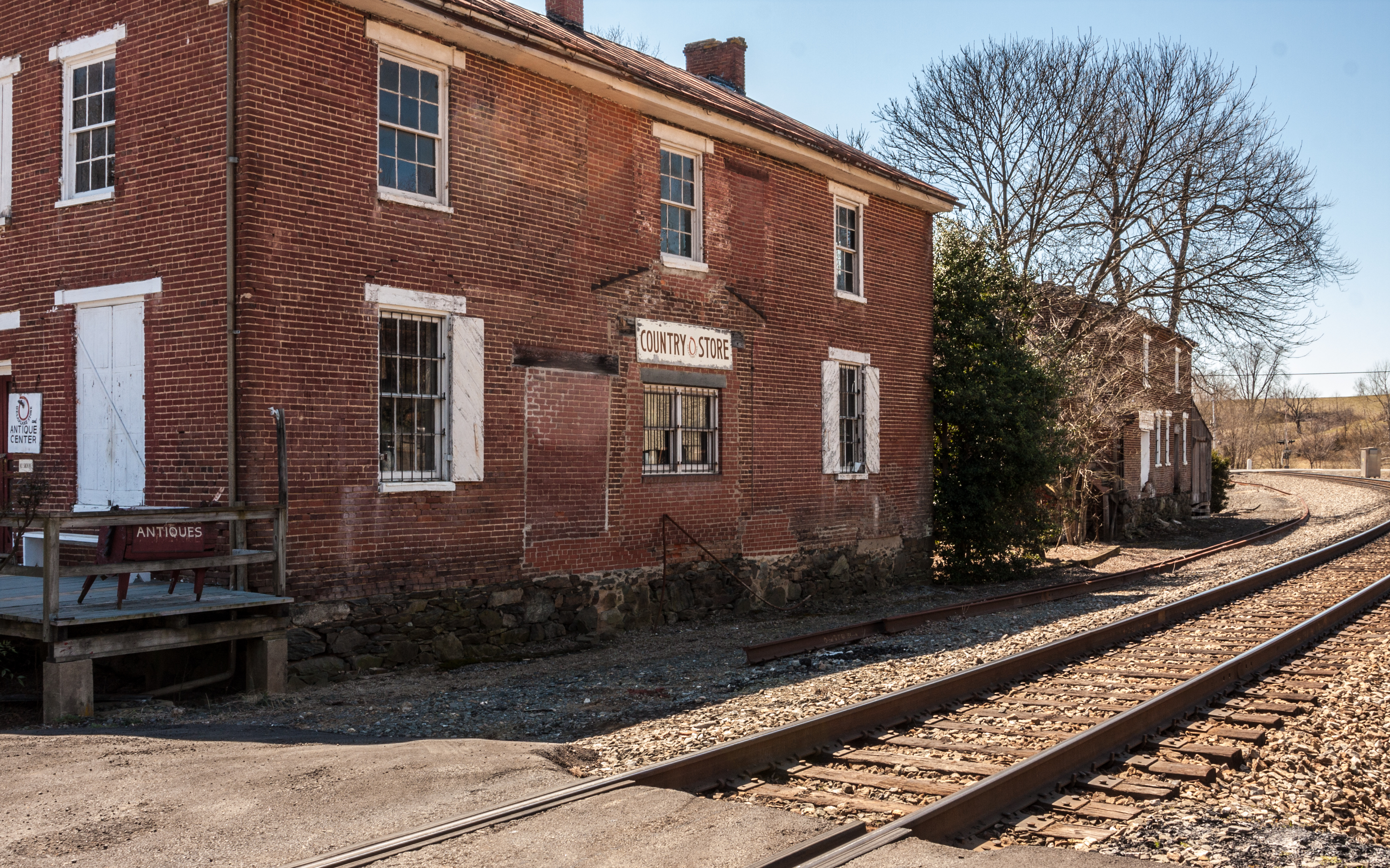
- Delaplane Country Store, April 2013

- Location within Northern Virginia Location within Virginia Location within the United States
- Location: Area including parts of Delaplane Grade Rd. and Rokeby Rd., Delaplane, Virginia
- Coordinates: 38°54′57″N 77°55′12″W
- Area: 19 acres (7.7 ha)
- Built: 1852
- Architectural style: Greek Revival, Italianate, I-house
- NRHP reference No.: 04000050
- VLR No.: 030-0002

Significant dates
- Added to NRHP: February 11, 2004
- Designated VLR: October 3, 2003

Delaplane Historic District is a national historic district located at Delaplane, Fauquier County, Virginia.

The rural village of Delaplane was founded in 1852 around the Piedmont Station of the newly chartered Manassas Gap Railroad (originally to link the Alexandria and Orange Railroad with the line running into the Shenandoah Valley at Manassas; still operated by the Norfolk Southern Railroad). The railroad built a station, a warehouse, and a store, and a town grew, as with the adjacent stops at Marshall and The Plains. As Delaplane prospered, the previously prosperous town of Paris on the Dumfries-Winchester Road (Virginia Route 17) lagged. The town's name was changed in 1874 to honor its postmaster and owner of the general store, Washington E. Delaplane.

The historic district today looks much like in 1861, when troops embarked en route to the First Battle of Bull Run, although that conflict (and troop movements of Union and Confederate Forces, including Mosby's Rangers) devastated the area. The surrounding area is part of the Commonwealth of Virginia's Mosby Heritage area, the first such heritage area and designated in order to draw attention to the historic, natural, and cultural resources in this section of Northern Virginia. It was listed on the National Register of Historic Places in 2004. It is included in the larger Crooked Run Valley Rural Historic District (at its southern end), also designated that year.

It includes 24 contributing buildings and 3 contributing sites in Delaplane. Several residential and commercial buildings date from the mid-19th century; other dwellings, businesses, and commercial structures date from the late-19th and early-20th centuries. Notable buildings include two vernacular Greek Revival style, two-story, brick structures that were used as stores, stations, and warehouses (1852); Roger's Depot; the Delaplane House (c. 1852); the old Shacklett's Mill (c. 1910); the old Delaplane Store (Turner Seaton's Store and Shacklett's store) that now houses the post office; and the McDonald House. The Westminster Presbyterian Church (now converted into a home) lies in this historic district, but the current town's two historic churches both lie slightly outside the limits of this historic district, although within the Crooked Run Valley historic district: Emmanuel Episcopal Church (Delaplane) (on Route 17; founded 1850 and used as a hospital by both Union and Confederate troops) and Pleasant Vale Baptist Church (at the intersection of route 724 and 826, built 1845).
