= Crooked Run Valley Rural Historic District =

Historic district in Virginia, United States

- U.S. National Register of Historic Places
- U.S. Historic district
- Virginia Landmarks Register
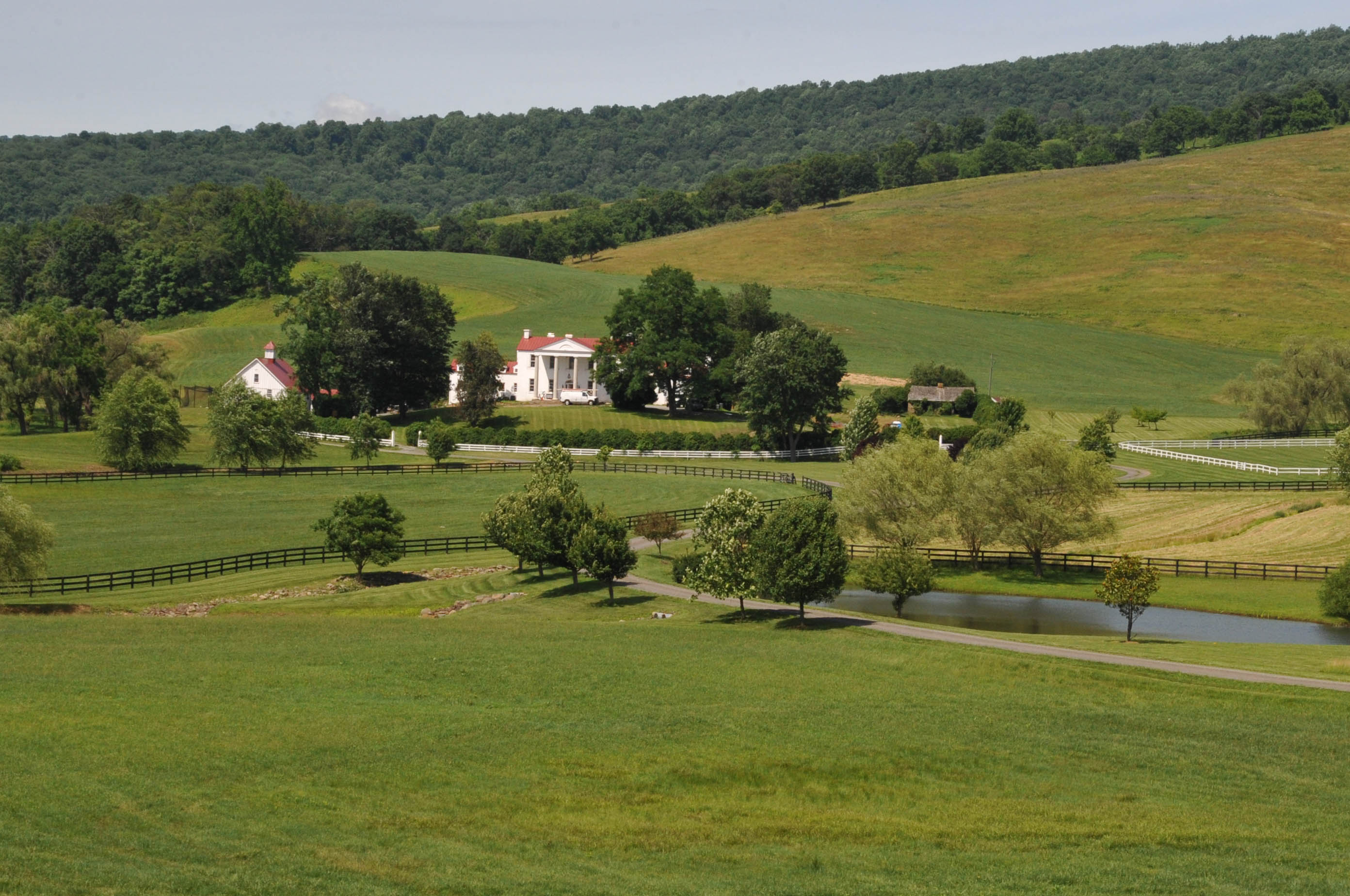

- Location within Northern Virginia Location within Virginia Location within the United States
- Location: Roughly bounded by Fauquier Cty Line, I-66, VA 712, Naked Mountain, and VA 55, near Paris, Virginia
- Coordinates: 38°57′44″N 77°56′20″W
- Area: 18,630 acres (7,540 ha)
- Built: 1810
- Architect: Sutton, William; et al.
- Architectural style: Colonial, Early Republic
- NRHP reference No.: 04000550
- VLR No.: 030-5369

Significant dates
- Added to NRHP: May 27, 2004
- Designated VLR: March 17, 2004

Crooked Run Valley Rural Historic District is a national historic district located near Paris, Fauquier County, Virginia. The district encompasses 386 contributing buildings, 27 contributing sites, and 21 contributing structures. It includes the separately listed Delaplane Historic District and Paris Historic District.

It was listed on the National Register of Historic Places in 2004.
