= Chattooga =

Chattooga may refer to:

- Chattooga County, Georgia
- Chattooga River, a designated National Wild and Scenic River in North Carolina
- Chattooga River (Alabama-Georgia), flowing from northwest Georgia into Alabama

== See also ==
- Chattanooga (disambiguation)
