= Sky Meadows State Park =

State park in Virginia, United States

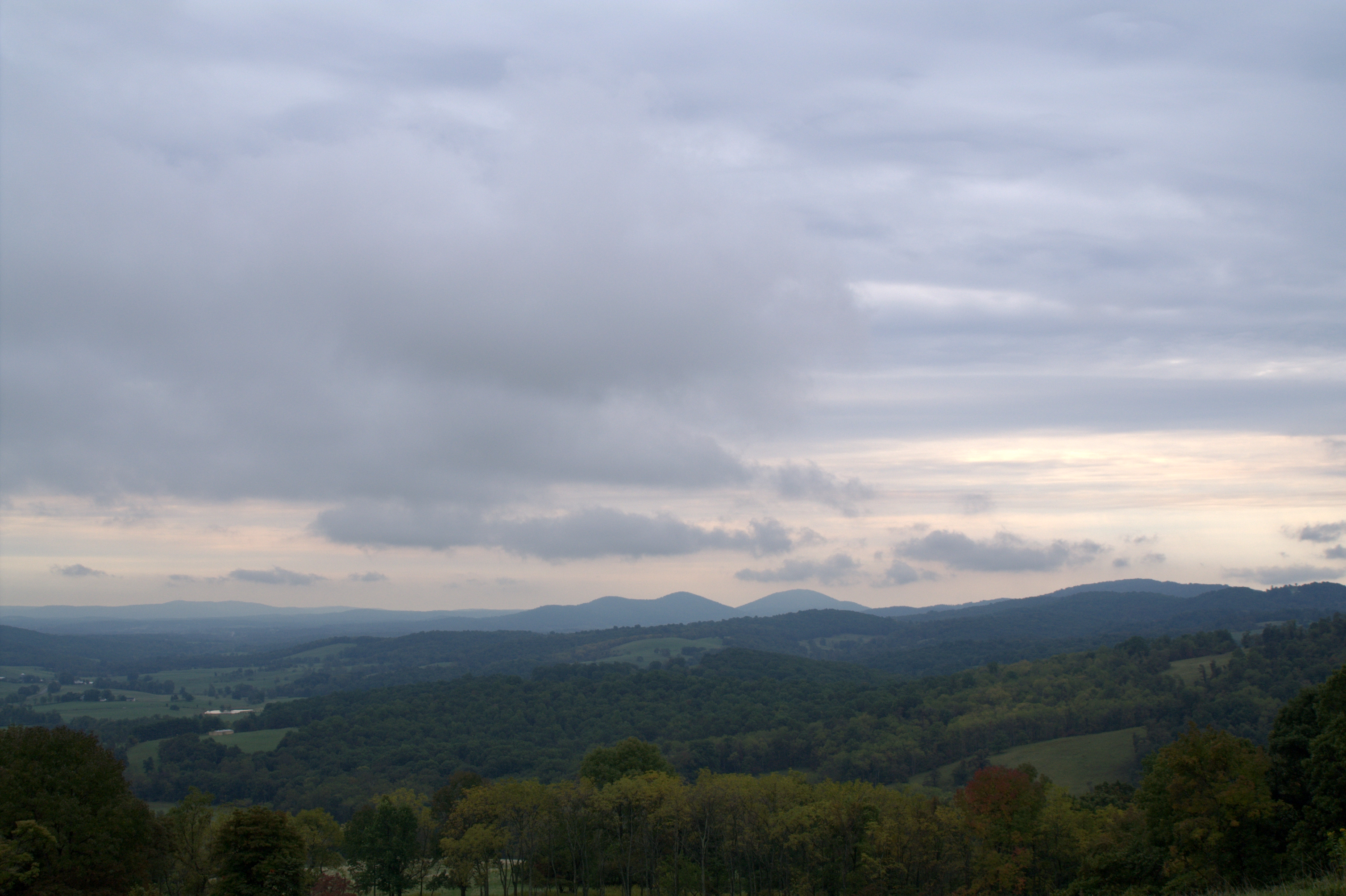
- Fall in Sky Meadows State Park

- Location within Virginia Location within the United States
- Location: Delaplane, Virginia
- Nearest city: Front Royal
- Coordinates: 38°59′5″N 77°57′31″W
- Area: 1,862 acres (754 ha)
- Established: 1975
- Governing body: Virginia Department of Conservation and Recreation
- Mt. Bleak-Skye Farm
- U.S. National Register of Historic Places
- U.S. Historic district
- Virginia Landmarks Register
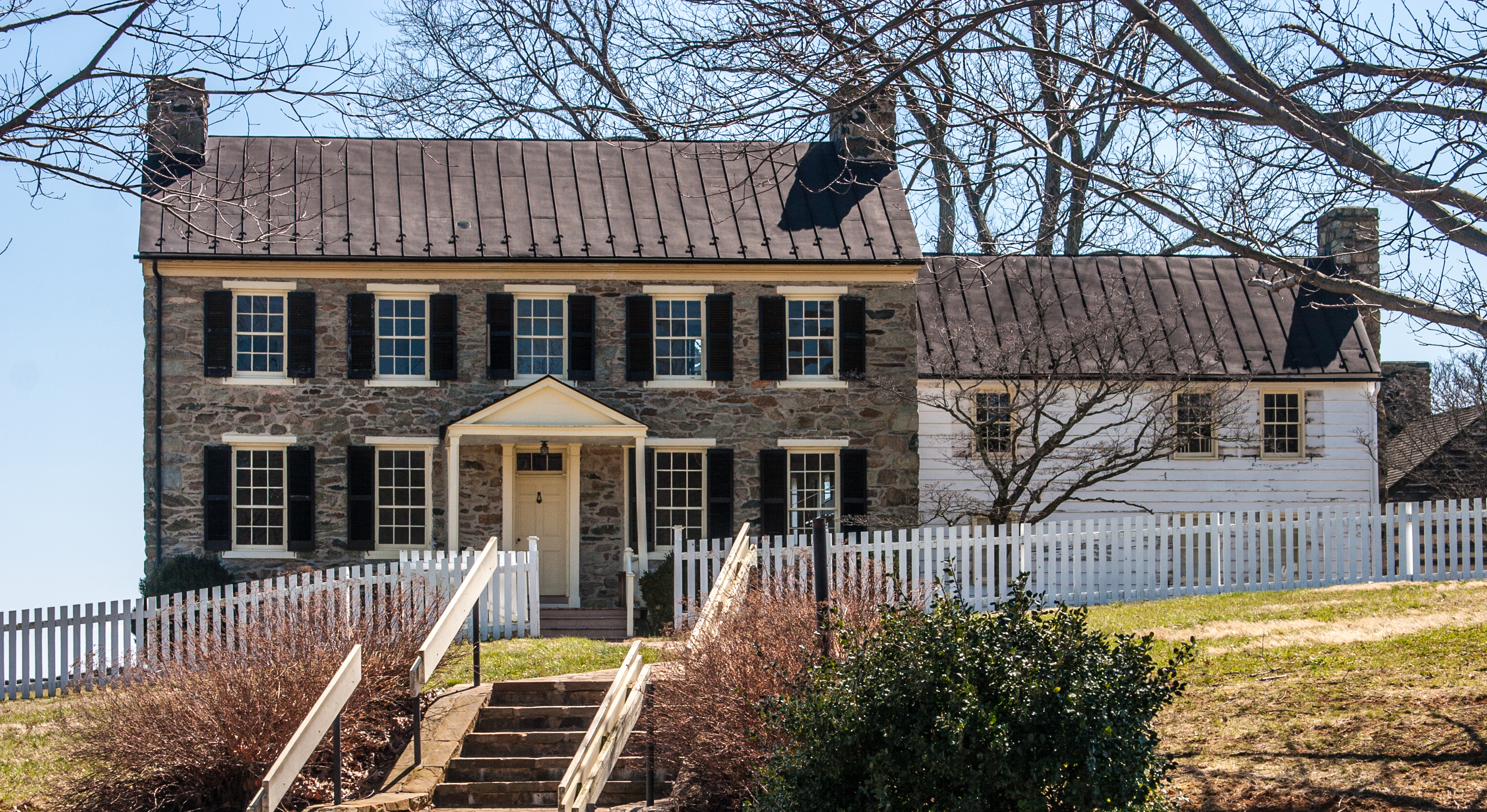
- Visitor Center at Mt Bleak-Skye Farm, April 2013
- Location: 11012 Edmonds Ln., near Delaplane, Virginia
- Area: 1,618.3 acres (654.9 ha)
- Built: c. 1780
- Architectural style: Federal, Vernacular
- NRHP reference No.: 04000552
- VLR No.: 030-0283

Significant dates
- Added to NRHP: May 24, 2004
- Designated VLR: March 17, 2004

Sky Meadows State Park is a 1,862-acre (754 ha) park in the Virginia state park system. In addition to preserved woodland, meadow and swamp, sections of the park are farmed, in part because it contains the former Mt. Bleak-Skye Farm which was listed on the National Register of Historic Places in 2004. Located in extreme northwest Fauquier County, Virginia in the Blue Ridge Mountains, near Paris, Virginia off U.S. 17, one mile (1.6 km) south of U.S. 50 and seven miles (11 km) north of Interstate 66, it is an International Dark Sky Park located about an hour outside the Washington, D.C. metro region.

== History ==
=== Mt. Bleak-Skye Farm ===
Mt. Bleak-Skye Farm is a national historic district located in Sky Meadows State Park. Before the American Civil War, it was farmed by Abner Settle and his family using enslaved labor. Son Dr. Thomas Settle was the physician who proclaimed John Brown dead after his execution for treason. Two other Settle sons fought for the Confederate States of America under the direction of John S. Mosby. The Settle family sold the property in 1866, after the war ended, and it had several subsequent names.

=== Formation ===
Philanthropist Paul Mellon donated 1,132 acres (458 ha) of land which became the park in 1975. The name Sky Meadows came from former owner Sir Robert Hadow, a British diplomat (consul general) who lived on the farm during World War II and who named the property "Skye Farm" after the Isle of Skye in the Inner Hebrides of Scotland. The park opened to the public on 27 August 1983. It has expanded its borders twice since then—248 acres (100 ha) were added in 1987, containing the Appalachian Trail, and in 1991 Mellon donated an additional 462 acres (187 ha), bringing the park to its present size.

=== Historic listing ===
The historic district encompasses 23 contributing buildings including barns, 1 contributing site, and 3 contributing structures dating between 1780 and 1954. The oldest is the 1 1/2-story, Wayside Cottage which was built about 1780. It also includes the Timberlake farmstead (c. 1860), Federal-style Mount Bleak mansion (c. 1843), and the frame Meeting House (c. 1845).

== Ecology, star-watching and camping amenities ==
It starts in a valley between the foothills and the Blue Ridge Mountains, then has meadows and forests stretching up to the ridge of the mountain and the Appalachian Trail.

There is a basic walk-in campground, over 12 miles (19 km) of hiking trails and 6 miles (10 km) of bridle paths. The horse trails are east of US 17 and the hiking trails (and most of the park) is west of US 17.

With a combination of meadows, grazed fields, forest, scrub, and streams, it has a wide variety of ecological zones.

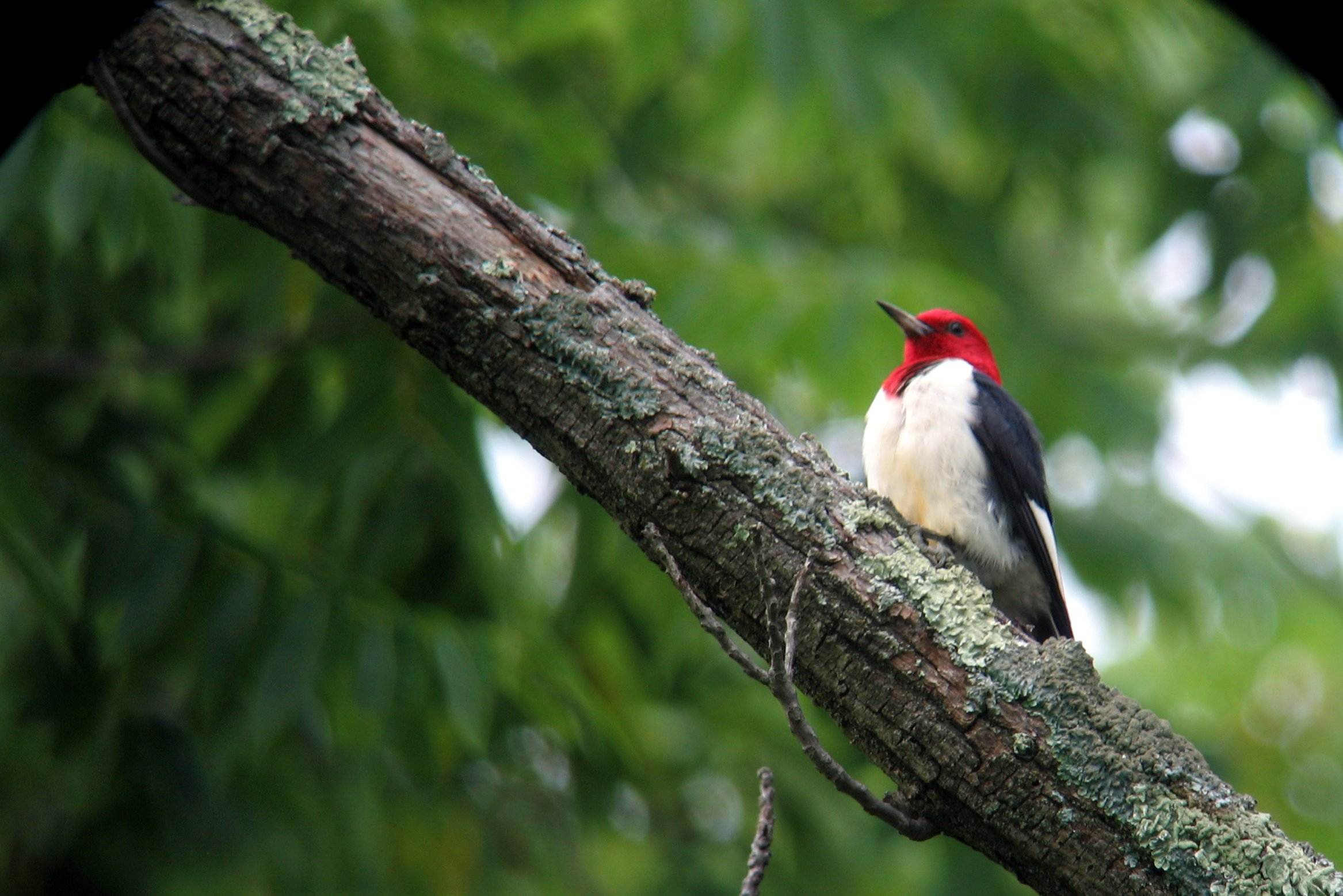
Red Headed Woodpecker at Sky Meadows State Park

Most of the year, there are monthly "astronomy nights" where amateur astronomers bring their telescopes and use them to show attendees various celestial objects. Typically, an astronomer from the Smithsonian Institution is among the leaders. The park was designated as an International Dark Sky Park by DarkSky International in April 2021.

Sky Meadows is a year-round bird watching site. It is known for a colony of red-headed woodpeckers that live in an oak grove just past the contact station. Depending on the time of the year, it is almost certain that this and the other six species of woodpeckers—downy, hairy, red-bellied, yellow-bellied sapsucker, pileated, and northern flicker—commonly found in this part of Virginia will be present.

Except for "astronomy nights", the park closes at dusk, and campers must be in the park and others out of the park at that time.

== See also ==
- List of Virginia state parks
- List of Virginia state forests
