= Ashleigh (Delaplane, Virginia) =

Historic house in Virginia, United States

- U.S. National Register of Historic Places
- Virginia Landmarks Register
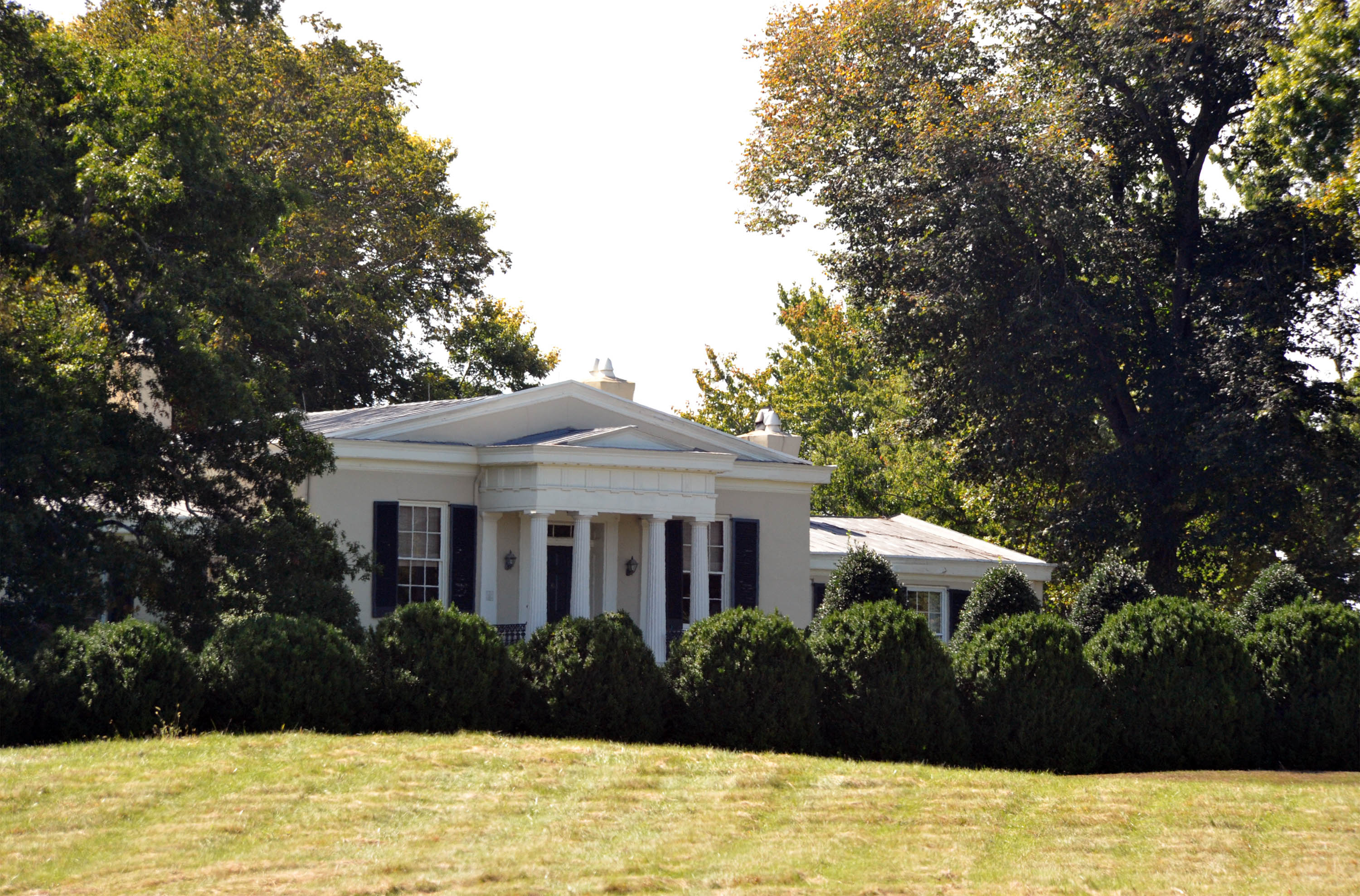

- Location within Northern Virginia Location within Virginia Location within the United States
- Location: South of Delaplane, off U.S. 17, near Delaplane, Virginia
- Coordinates: 38°54′07.56″N 77°55′07.32″W
- Area: 100 acres (40 ha)
- Built: 1840
- Architect: Marshall, Margaret
- Architectural style: Greek Revival
- NRHP reference No.: 73002012
- VLR No.: 030-0005

Significant dates
- Added to NRHP: August 14, 1973
- Designated VLR: February 20, 1973

Ashleigh is a Greek Revival style house located in Fauquier County near Delaplane, Virginia. The one-story house was built in 1840 for Margaret Marshal, the granddaughter of John Marshall on a portion of the family's Oak Hill estate (not to be confused with the nearby James Monroe House named Oak Hill).

The house was designed by Margaret Marshall and built by a man named Sutton. Margaret married John Thomas Smith in 1845 and they lived at Ashleigh until 1860. That year the house was sold to another relative, Gray Carroll. The property was sold by Carroll to Samuel P. Bayly in 1870. The house passed through a number of owners, with Dr. Edmund Horgan renovating the house in 1929. Horgan obtained pine paneling that had been removed from the White House during renovation work and installed it in the lower southeast room.

The house is one story with three bays flanked by one-story two-bay wings on either side. The sloping site makes the basement a full story on the south side of the main and west wings. The house is built of stone covered with stucco. A Greek Doric portico is centered on the main facade. An entrance hall extends across the front with a parlor behind. Halls extend into the center of each wing down a flight of three steps, with two rooms on either side. The garden features a boxwood hedge.

Ashleigh was placed on the National Register of Historic Places on August 14, 1973.
