= American Civil War battlefield preservation =

Public and private preservation efforts

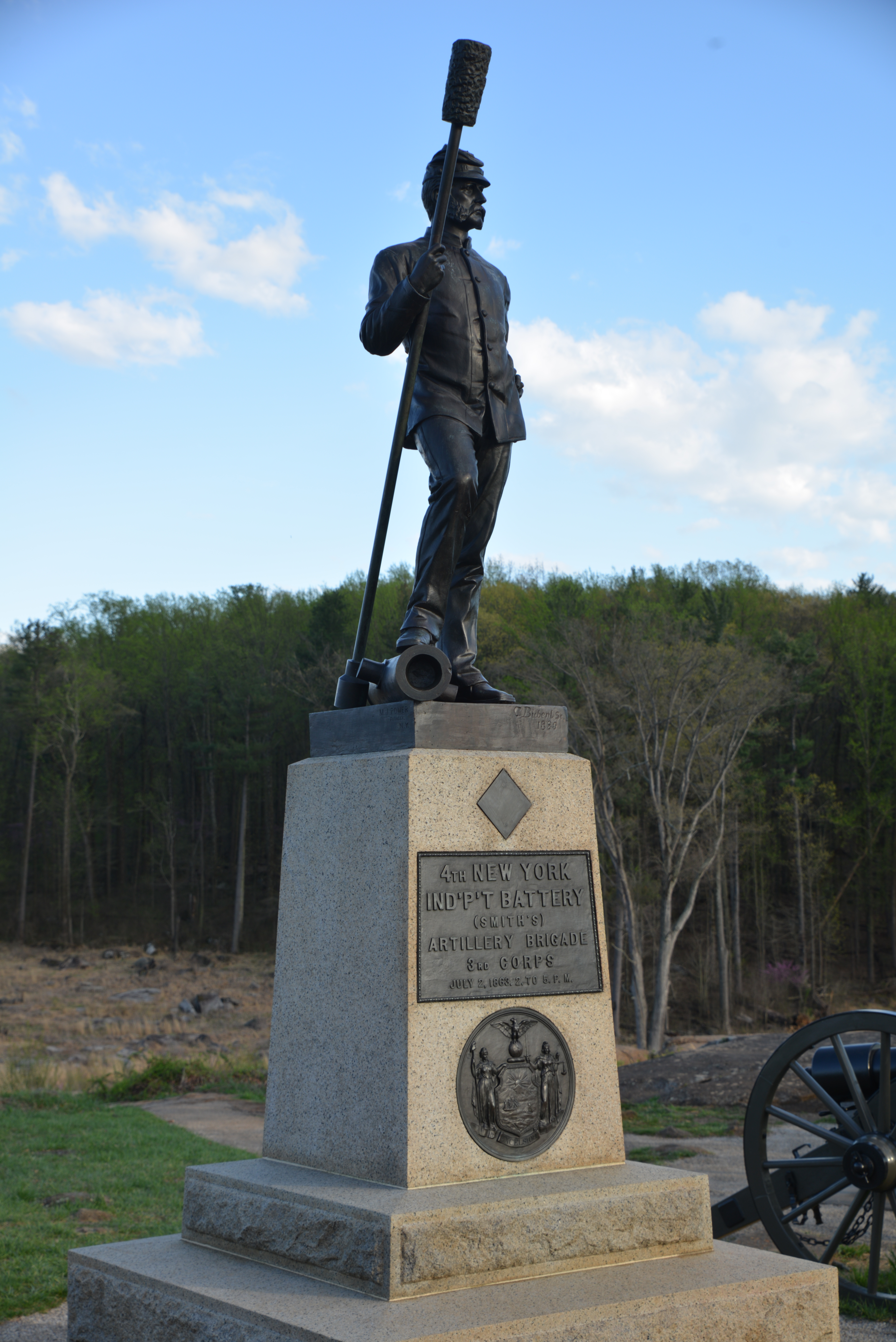
Monument at the Gettysburg National Military Park.

The practice of preserving the battlefields of the American Civil War for historical and memorial reasons has been developed over more than 150 years in the United States. Even during the American Civil War active duty soldiers on both sides of the conflict began erecting impromptu battlefield monuments to their recently fallen comrades. Since these initial attempts at preservation and commemoration, important Civil War battle sites have been preserved by various groups and many are now in the care of the National Park Service and overseen by the American Battlefield Protection Program (ABPP). Of approximately 10,500 acts of aggression that occurred between the United States and the Confederacy 384 have been identified in a 1993 federal report as being principal to the conflict. From these, a select few have been chosen based on their historical significance, accessibility, and preservability to be federally curated. Beyond sites run by the U.S. Federal government, many secondary battle sites across the United States are maintained and operated by state governments and private historical groups.

== History of Civil War battlefield preservation ==
During the Civil War, soldiers on both sides marked the places where their comrades had fallen and erected small monuments at battle sites they had successfully defended or captured. Though rudimentary in nature these battlefield cemeteries prevented the spaces from being developed and the monuments helped to guide later preservation efforts. Real preservation efforts began in the 1890s when sectional tensions had begun to decrease. These efforts tended to focus on the bravery of the soldiers in each individual battles rather than the conflict as a whole in order to minimize conflict over the sites. A second wave of commemoration efforts took place at the end of the First World War. Though initially fueled by patriotic fervor preservation efforts were continued as a way to stimulate job creation during the New Deal. All efforts stopped during the Second World War and were not continued at its conclusion. Due to the Civil War's association with slavery and its continuing legacy of racial violence it became closely associated with the Civil Rights Movement. This politicized battlefield preservation efforts causing the Federal government to distance itself. Real interest in the Civil War was sparked in the 1990s by Ken Burns' documentary The Civil War. By this time the government had taken a 60-year hiatus from preservation efforts and the movement was now run by private organizations, primarily the Civil War Trust.

== National Civil War Military Parks and National Battlefields ==
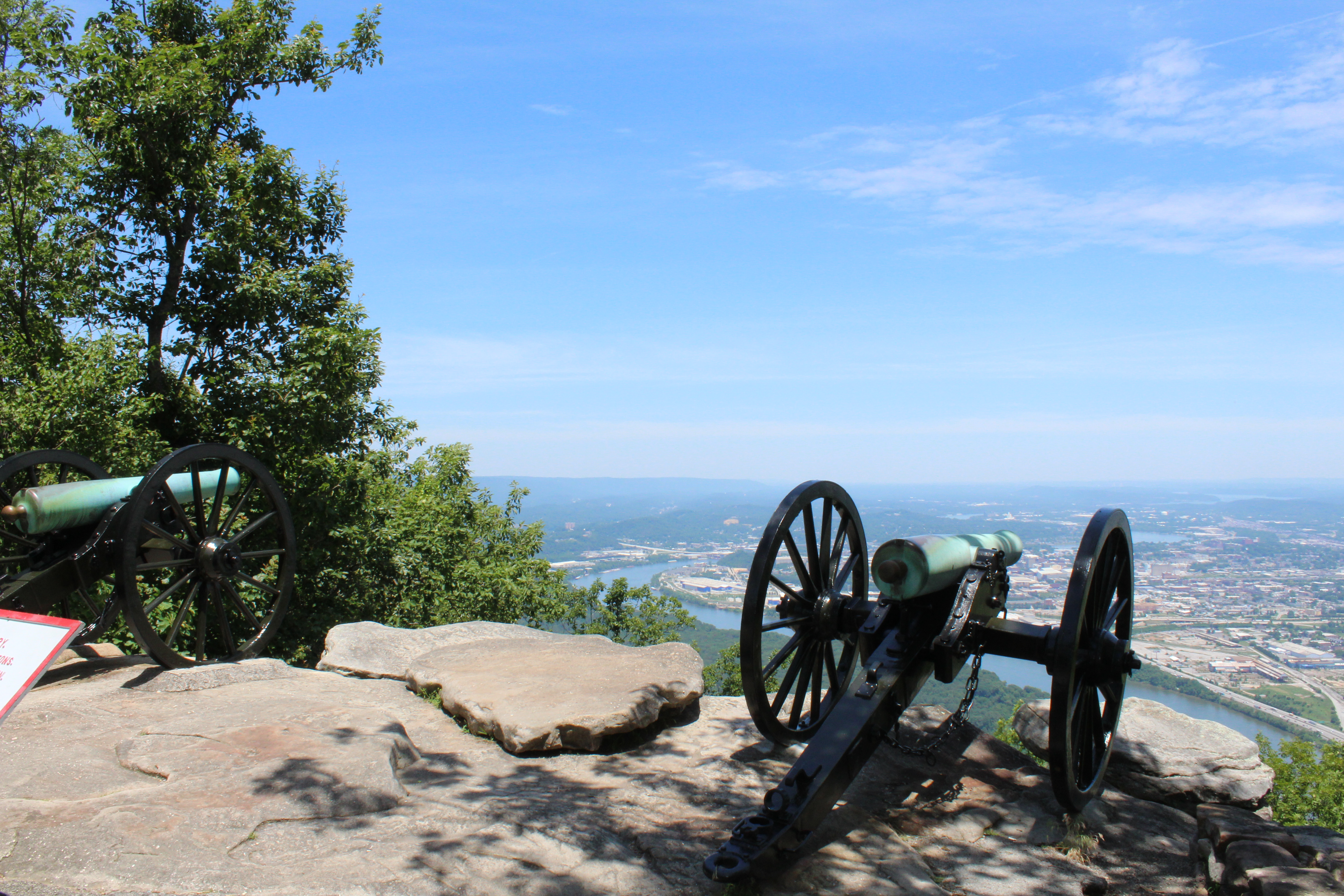
Chickamauga and Chattanooga National Military Park.

The 17 Civil War battle sites that are cared for by the NSP are listed under four different designations: National Military Parks, National Battlefields, National Battlefield Parks, and National Battlefield Sites. Not all of these battles are widely considered to be particularly important and many other battles that have not been given any official designation. There are those who believe that the selection process and marketing of Civil War battlefields are a highly political issue even into the 21st century. The primary complaint of scholars and select visitors is that these federally preserved sites, intentionally or unintentionally preserve and promote the 'Lost Cause' narrative. Furthermore, the NPS service came under fire for their preservation efforts because they largely ignored slavery as a component of the Civil War until the 1990s.

Civil War National Military Parks

- Chickamauga and Chattanooga National Military Park
- Fredericksburg and Spotsylvania County Memorial National Military Park
- Gettysburg National Military Park
- Pea Ridge National Military Park
- Shiloh National Military Park
- Vicksburg National Military Park

Civil War National Battlefields

- Antietam National Battlefield
- Fort Donelson National Battlefield
- Monocacy National Battlefield
- Petersburg National Battlefield
- Stones River National Battlefield
- Tupelo National Battlefield
- Wilson's Creek National Battlefield

Civil War National Battlefield Parks

- Kennesaw Mountain National Battlefield Park
- Manassas National Battlefield Park
- Richmond National Battlefield Park

Civil War National Battlefield Sites

- Brices Cross Roads National Battlefield Site

== State and locally preserved Civil War Battlefields ==
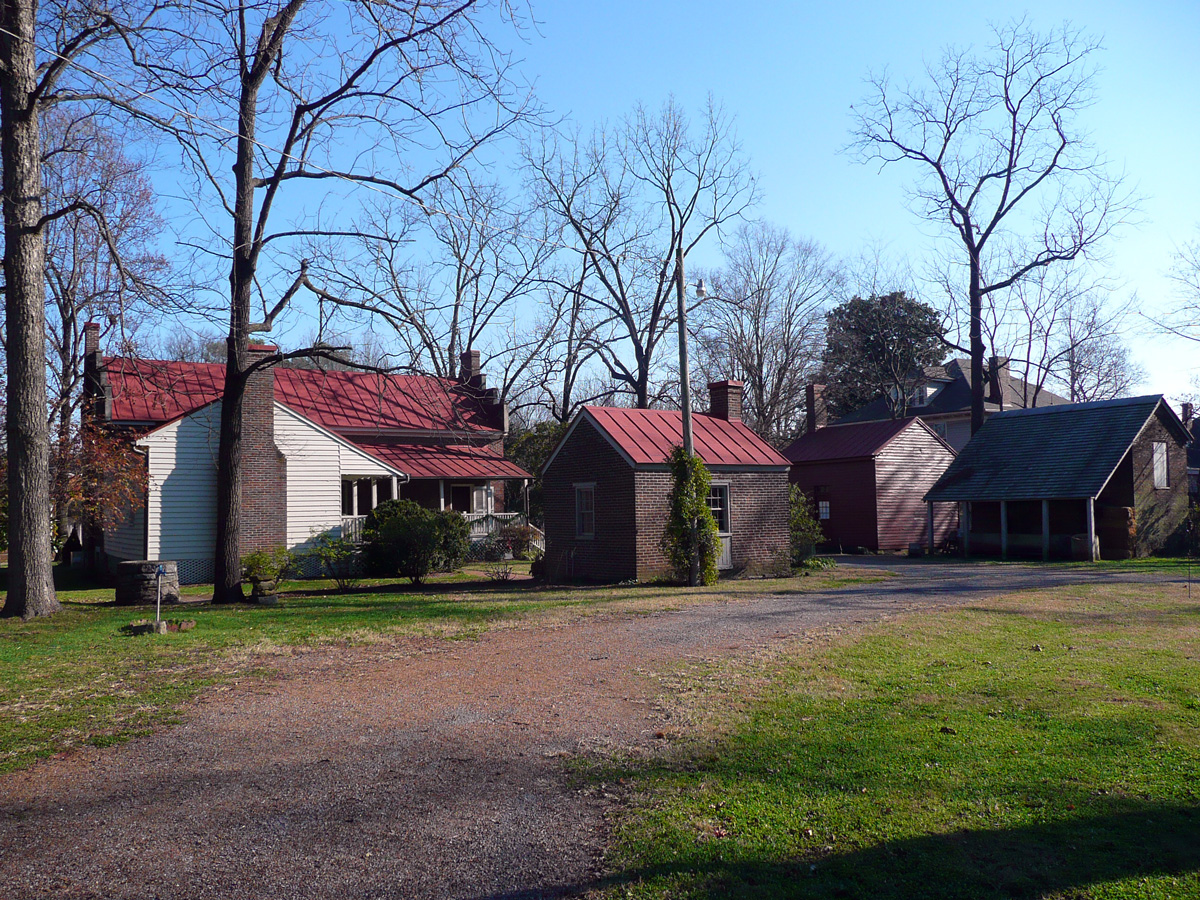
The Carter House at the Battle of Franklin. A site originally purchased and preserved by the Sons of Confederate Veterans.

Various state governments have taken it upon themselves to preserve select Civil War battlefields throughout the United States. Though these tend to be smaller and less important battle sites than those run by the federal government they also tend to display much stronger biases in their recounting of historical events, often reflecting the sentiments of the locale surrounding the site and the time at which preservation efforts began. Most recent state preservation efforts have tended to present battle narratives in a more balanced way then those established in the first half of the 20th century.

When neither the federal or state government undertake the preservation of a Civil War battle site, occasionally private associations will raise funds through donations and government grants to preserve the site if their members and donors deem it historically important. These sites operate in a mostly independent manner which can be problematic, especially since many of these associations are offshoots of organizations fundamentally charged with the advancement of the 'Lost Cause' narrative such as the Daughters of the Confederacy and the Sons of Confederate Veterans. Even battlefields that are the sites of Union victories often heavily focus on the personal narratives of Confederate commanders and the bravery of the soldiers under their command, largely ignoring the actual outcome of the battle. The most prevalent and balanced preserver of Civil War Battlefields is the American Battlefield Trust (formerly the Civil War Trust). An independent organization created to preserve the history of the Civil War that has taken the lead in preservation efforts nationwide in the late 20th and early 21st century.
