= Steve Ashby =

American sculptor

Steve Ashby (1904–1980) was an American folk artist.

The son of an emancipated slave, Ashby was born in Delaplane, Virginia, one of twelve children. He received little formal schooling, and remained illiterate for his entire life. He spent most of his life in Delaplane except for a short time as a waiter at a hotel in nearby Marshall; for the bulk of that time he worked the farm where his father and previous generations of his family had been enslaved. Late in his twenties, he married an older woman, Eliza King, who was a cook at a boarding school for girls, and they moved into an abandoned one-room schoolhouse. They had no children, but adopted a boy.

Throughout his life Ashby was interested in sculpture, making mostly small wooden pieces before his wife's death in 1960. It was after that date, and his retirement from farming, that he began to create his "fixing-ups", as he called them: larger figure sculptures that he used to decorate his house and yard. Made largely from pieces of timber and lumber, they were augmented with paint, pieces of old clothing, magazine cut-outs, and other found objects. Lively and expressionistic, they are often quite erotic; some of his kinetic pieces depict explicitly sexual activity. His first piece was a depiction of his deceased wife, completely dressed in her clothing. The narratives hinted at by Ashby's pieces are ambiguous, but contain undertones of the racial tensions prominent in American society during the period as well as images suggested by popular culture such as Blaxploitation films. Others are inspired by the agricultural activities prevalent in the area surrounding Delaplane. A single sculpture made out of concrete is also known. Ashby began to gain recognition for his art late in life.

Eight pieces by Ashby are in the collection of the Smithsonian American Art Museum, while three are held at the American Folk Art Museum. Other work is owned by Vassar College.
