= Chattanooga (disambiguation) =

Chattanooga is a city in the U.S. state of Tennessee.

Chattanooga may also refer to:

== Places in the United States ==
- Chattanooga, Ohio, an unincorporated community
- Chattanooga, Oklahoma, a town
- Chattanooga Creek, a stream in Georgia and Tennessee
- Chattanooga Valley, Georgia

== Military ==
- Battle of Chattanooga (disambiguation), three different engagements during the American Civil War in 1862 and 1863
- USS Chattanooga, four United States Navy ships

== Sports teams ==
- Chattanooga Lookouts, a minor league baseball team currently affiliated with the Cincinnati Reds
- Chattanooga Mocs, the sports teams at the University of Tennessee at Chattanooga
- Chattanooga Black Lookouts, a former Negro league baseball team

== Music and entertainment ==
- Chattanooga (band), Swedish pop trio
- Chattanooga Choo Choo, is a 1941 song written by Mack Gordon and composed by Harry Warren
- Chattanooga, a 1905 play by Anthony E. Wills

== See also ==
- Chattooga (disambiguation)
- Pedro "Chatanuga" Weber
