= Delaplane, Virginia =

Unincorporated community in Virginia, United States

- Unincorporated community
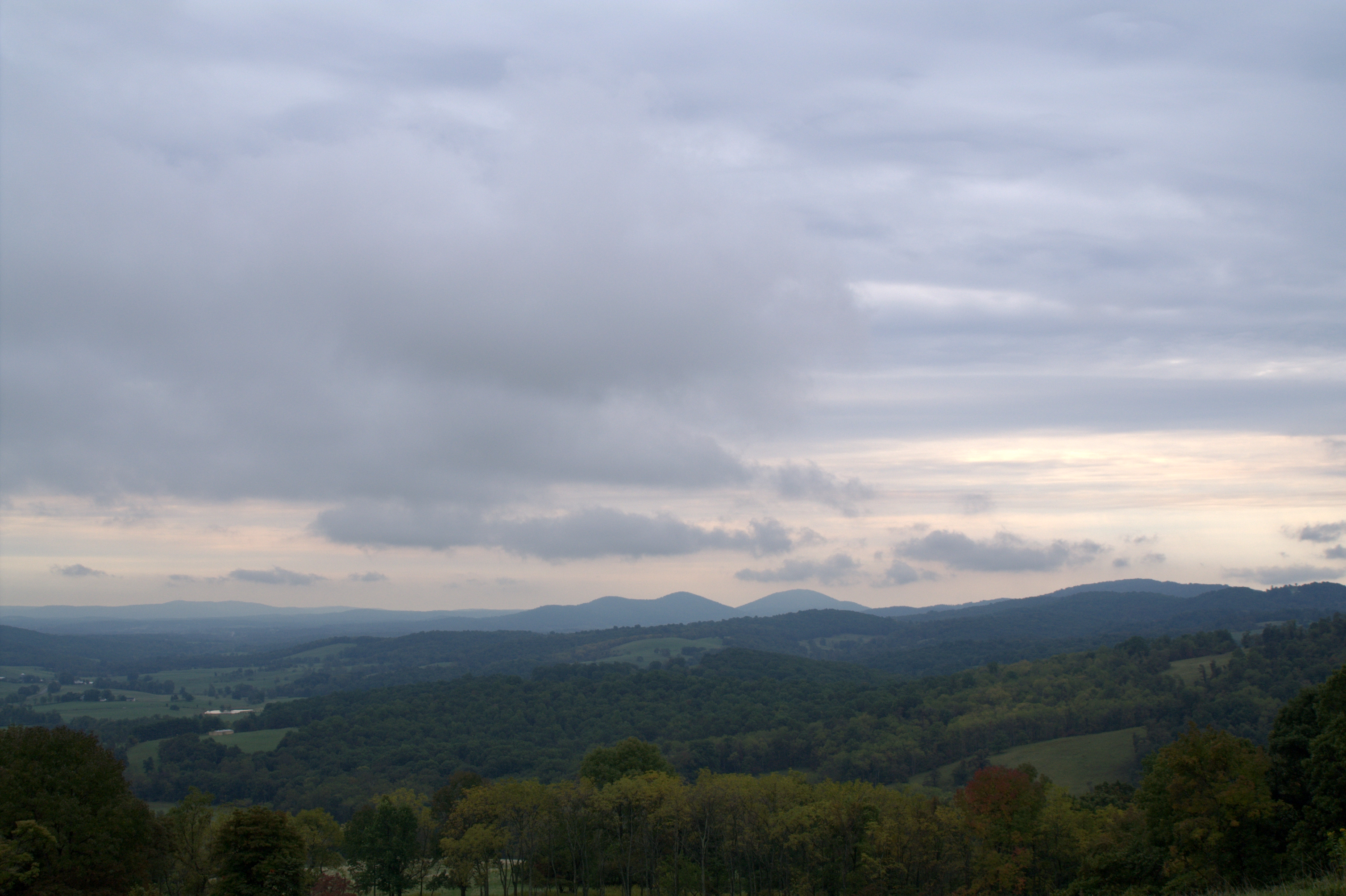
- The Cobbler Mountain range viewed from Sky Meadows State Park in Delaplane

- Location within Virginia
- Coordinates: 38°54′54″N 77°55′13″W
- Country: United States
- State: Virginia
- County: Fauquier County
- Nearest city: Washington, D.C. 50 miles (80 km)

Delaplane is a small unincorporated village in northern Fauquier County, Virginia, United States, approximately 50 miles (80 km) due west of Washington, D.C. Delaplane is situated along U.S. Route 17, U.S. Route 50 and Interstate 66; the community is bordered by Upperville to the north, Hume to the south, Paris to the west and Rectortown to the east. Delaplane has a ZIP Code of 20144.

== History ==
Located in the heart of Virginia's famous Piedmont Hunt Country, Delaplane was originally known as Piedmont Station, a small village formed around a stop on the Manassas Gap Railroad. In 1874, it was renamed in honor of W. E. Delaplane, a prominent businessman who generously restored operations at the local general store that faltered in the aftermath of the American Civil War.

In 1861, General Stonewall Jackson marched his troops from Winchester to the Piedmont Station train depot, where they loaded onto rail cars headed for the First Battle of Manassas. This marked the first time a railroad had been used to move troops into battle.

Delaplane encompasses some of North America's oldest fox hunting territory, and from 1932 to 1945, Delaplane's Cobbler Mountain range hosted many of General George S. Patton's fabled escapades with his Cobbler Fox Hounds club. Patton was Master of Foxhounds until his military transfer to Hawaii in 1935, and the club was disbanded ten years later upon receiving news of his untimely death in Heidelberg, Germany. Today, Piedmont Fox Hounds (based in The Plains), the oldest fox hunting club in the United States, still hunts Delaplane's rustic, stone-wall-lined terrain; as do Orange County Hunt (based in Middleburg) and Old Dominion Hounds.

In 1975, local resident and philanthropist Paul Mellon donated a 1,132-acre (4,580,000 m^{2}; 458 ha) tract of land in Delaplane to the Commonwealth of Virginia creating Sky Meadows State Park, which hosts the Delaplane Strawberry Festival every Memorial Day. The tract's previous owner, the late Sir Robert Hadow, was a Consul General from Great Britain and originally named the parcel Skye Farm after the island in Scotland which the area reminded him of. In 1991, Paul Mellon presented an additional 462-acre adjoining tract as a gift to the park. This tract, renamed the Lost Mountain Bridle Trail Area, was originally surveyed by George Washington and purchased by Washington from his client Lord Fairfax. More recently, in his memoirs, Virginia Senator John Warner fondly recalled childhood summers spent working at Hill Crest Farm in Delaplane while on break from St. Albans School in nearby Washington, D.C.

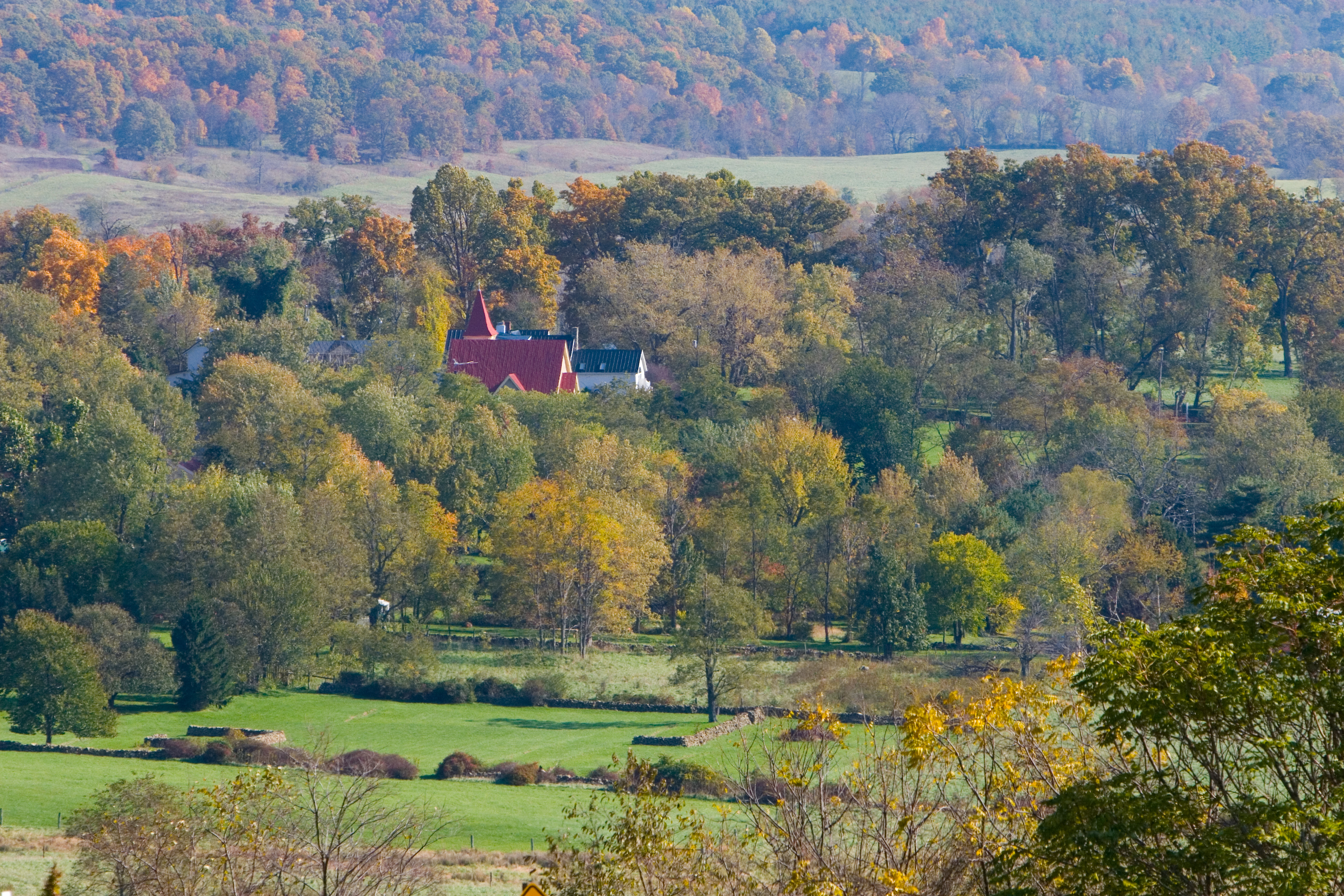
Village of Paris, northwest of Delaplane

== Points of interest ==
Today, the village of Delaplane remains home to Emmanuel Episcopal Church, an antique shop, and a working post office; with nearby towns of Upperville, Middleburg, and Marshall providing commercial services to Delaplane's widely spaced residents.

Delaplane's proximity to Washington, D.C., along with a remarkably well preserved agricultural heritage dating back to the 19th century, gave rise to numerous and expansive country estates. Many of these are individually listed on the National Register of Historic Places such as Mount Bleak House, Moreland, Oak Hill (an early home of John Marshall, Chief Justice of the United States), Ashleigh, Belle Grove, and Woodside.

Although Delaplane's agricultural community is historically associated with champion Black Angus cattle, Delaplane today comprises almost two-thirds of the Middleburg American Viticultural Area, with the Delaplane, VA ZIP Code encompassing more working vineyards than any other outside of Sonoma Valley, CA.

Along with Sky Meadows State Park, Delaplane is home to the G. Richard Thompson Wildlife Management Area, the Crooked Run Valley Rural Historic District, and Goose Creek, a designated Virginia State Scenic River. Delaplane Historic District was added to the National Register of Historic Places in February 2004. The state-funded Virginia Outdoors Foundation, along with private conservation groups such as the Piedmont Environmental Council, have helped place the vast predominance of Delaplane's privately held land into perpetual conservation easement. These efforts, coupled with Delaplane's ensconcement within northern Fauquier County's most restrictive "RC" (Rural Conservation) zoning district, have imposed strict limits on development and fostered the growth of local, family-oriented farm-to-table efforts such as Hollin Farms and Valley View Farm that participate in the Piedmont Environmental Council's Buy Fresh Buy Local program.

== Notable people ==
- Steve Ashby (1904–1980), a sculptor
- Numa P. G. Adams (1885–1940), a dean at Howard University College of Medicine of Medicine
- Sandra Payson (1926–2004), arts patron, socialite
