= Woodside (Delaplane, Virginia) =

Historic house in Virginia, United States

- U.S. National Register of Historic Places
- Virginia Landmarks Register
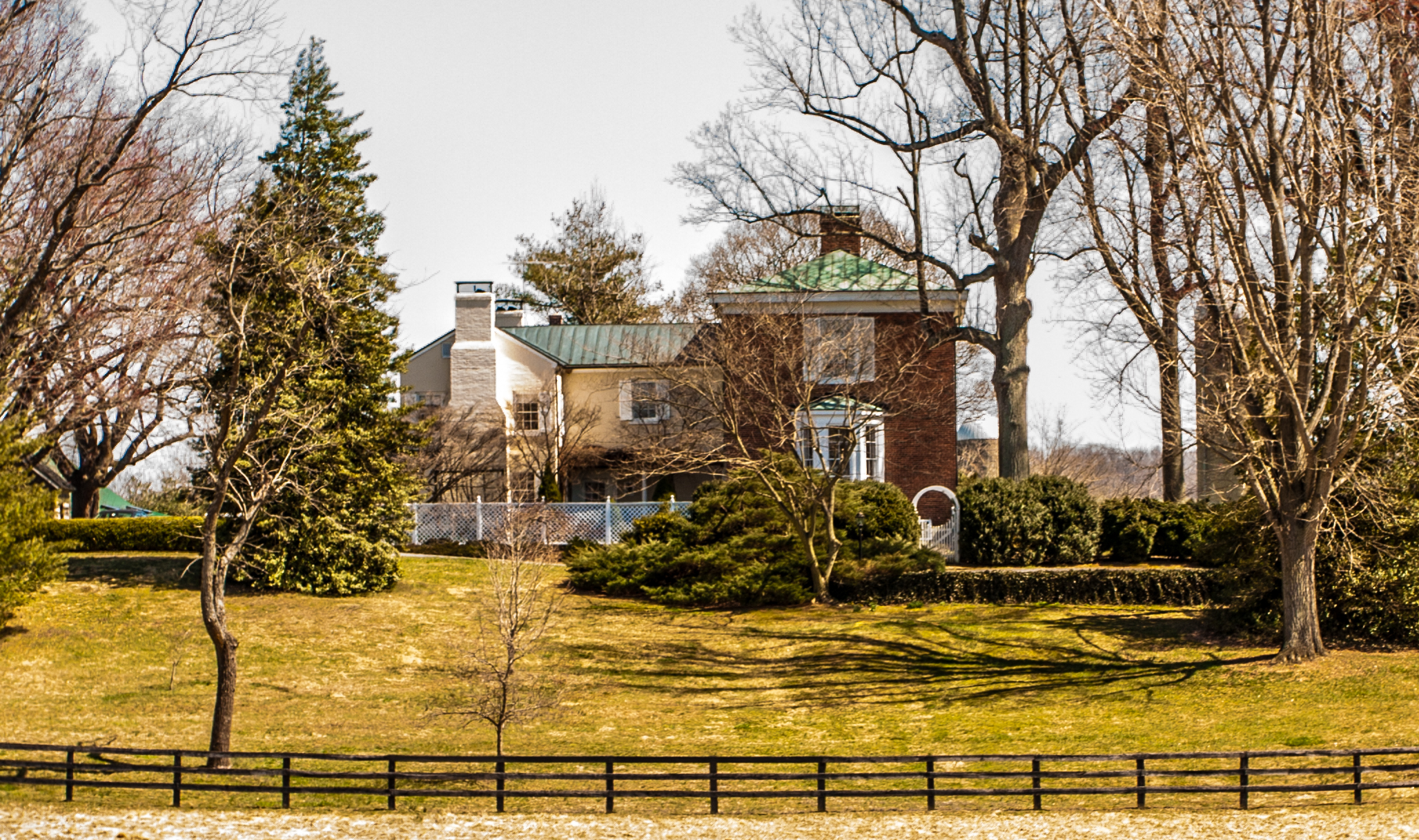
- Woodside, April 2013

- Location within Northern Virginia Location within Virginia Location within the United States
- Location: 9525 Maidstone Rd., near Delaplane, Virginia
- Coordinates: 38°54′13″N 77°54′06″W
- Area: 32.5 acres (13.2 ha)
- Built: c. 1800, 1848
- Built by: Sutton, William L.
- Architectural style: Greek Revival
- NRHP reference No.: 09000616
- VLR No.: 030-0059

Significant dates
- Added to NRHP: August 12, 2009
- Designated VLR: June 18, 2009

Woodside is a historic home located near Delaplane, Fauquier County, Virginia. The oldest section was built about 1800, and is located in the rear. It is of hewn log construction (possibly chestnut), clad with a brick veneer in the mid-20th century and connected to the main house by a hyphen. The main house was built in 1848, and is a two-story, three-bay, brick structure in a vernacular Greek Revival style. Also on the property are the contributing log kitchen and a log smokehouse, both built about 1800.

It was listed on the National Register of Historic Places in 2009.
