= Battle of Chattanooga =

There were three battles of Chattanooga fought in Chattanooga, Tennessee, during the American Civil War:

- First Battle of Chattanooga (June 7–8, 1862), minor artillery bombardment by Union Brigadier General James S. Negley against Confederate Maj. Gen. Edmund Kirby Smith
- Second Battle of Chattanooga (August 21, 1863), Union artillery bombardment that convinced Bragg to evacuate the city
- Chattanooga campaign or the Battles for Chattanooga, (November 23–25, 1863) Union Major General Ulysses S. Grant, fighting alongside General George Henry Thomas, defeated Confederate General Braxton Bragg
  - Battle of Lookout Mountain, and Battle of Missionary Ridge, two battles in the campaign

== See also ==
- Chattanooga (disambiguation)
