= Kushla, Alabama =

Unincorporated community in Alabama, United States

- Unincorporated community
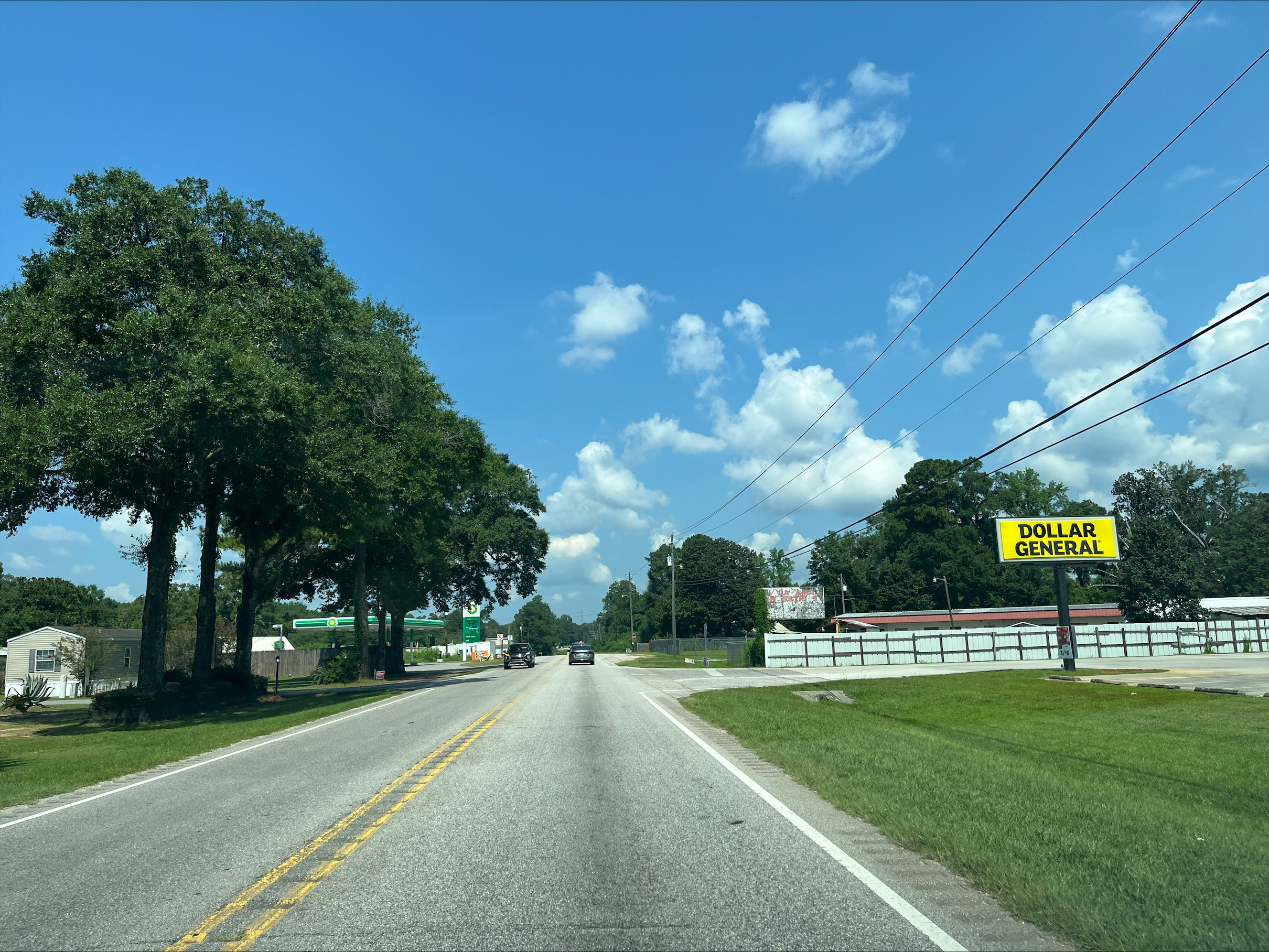
- Kushla along U.S. Route 45

- Location within Alabama Location within the United States
- Coordinates: 30°48′56″N 088°09′29″W
- Country: United States
- State: Alabama
- County: Mobile
- Elevation: 62 ft (19 m)
- Time zone: UTC-6 (Central (CST))
  - Summer (DST): UTC-5 (CDT)
- Area code: 251
- GNIS ID: 121285

Kushla is an unincorporated community in Mobile County, Alabama, United States. A post office operated under the name Kushla from 1887 to 1919. The community's name is likely derived from the Choctaw words kusha meaning "cane" and hieli meaning "standing".

== Geography ==
Kushla is located at 30°48′56″N 088°09′29″W. The elevation is 62 feet (19 m).
