= Paris, Virginia =

Unincorporated Village in Fauquier County, Virginia, U.S.

- Unincorporated Village
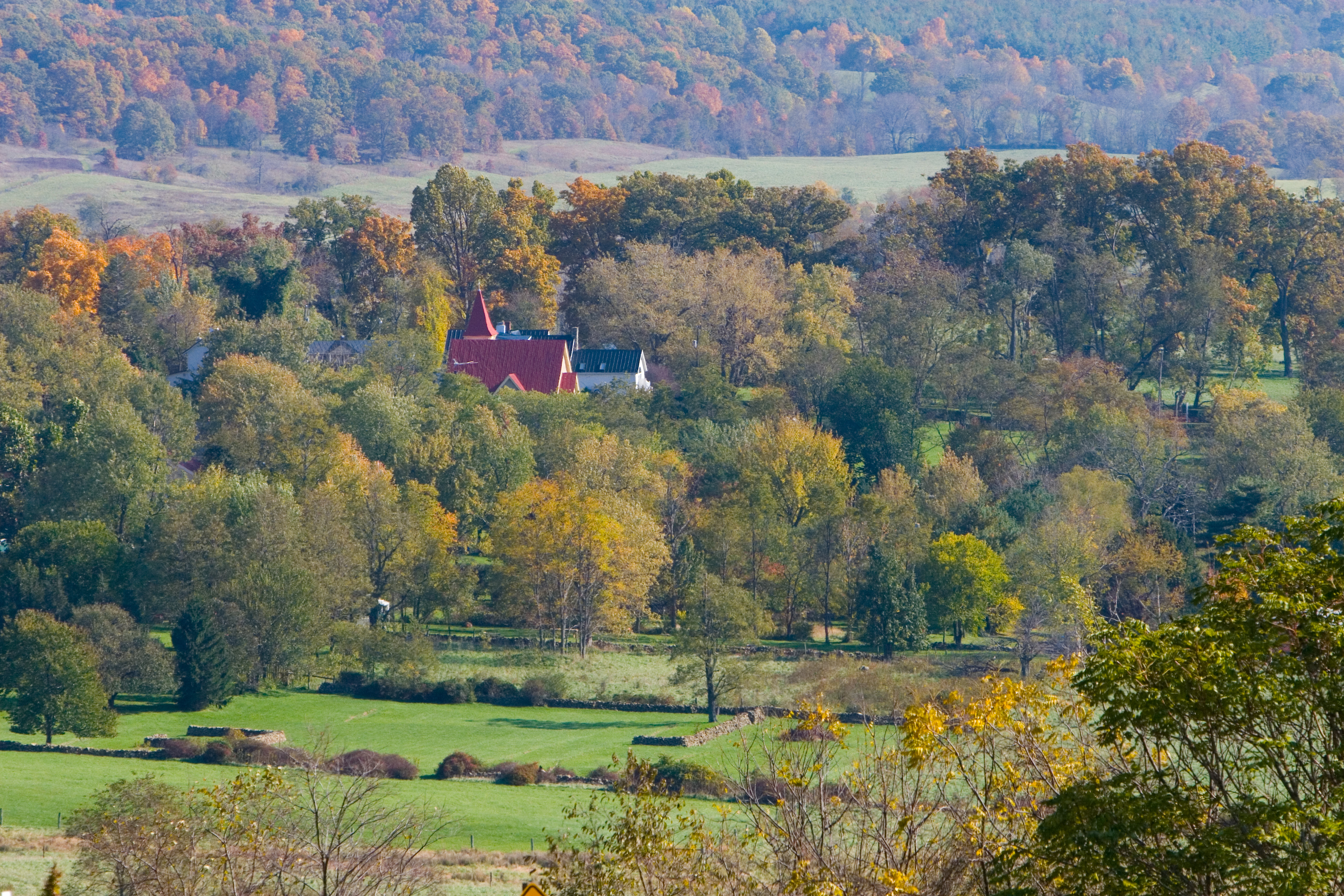
- Paris in autumn (Trinity United Methodist Church with Ashby Inn behind it)

- Location within the Commonwealth of Virginia Paris (Virginia) Paris (the United States)
- Coordinates: 39°00′16″N 77°57′05″W
- Country: United States
- State: Virginia
- County: Fauquier

Area
  - Total: 0.25 sq mi (0.66 km^{2})
  - Land: 0.25 sq mi (0.65 km^{2})
  - Water: 0.0039 sq mi (0.01 km^{2})
- Time zone: UTC−5 (Eastern (EST))
  - Summer (DST): UTC−4 (EDT)
- ZIP codes: 20130
- FIPS code: 061
- GNIS feature ID: 1493393

Paris is a small unincorporated village in Fauquier County, Virginia, United States, near the borders of Loudoun and Clarke counties. Located in Virginia's hunt country, it was established in a strategic spot at the eastern base of Ashby Gap along U.S. Routes 17 and 50.

== History ==
Peter Glascock acquired the deed for what became the town in 1786 from Kimball Hicks. The land had been part of the Northern Neck Proprietary and also part of Thomas Lord Fairfax's Leeds Manor.

Hicks had operated a tavern nearby since 1782, and Glascock also operated a similar venture, both of which were sometimes cited for failure to adhere to the terms of their licenses. A post office existed by September 1800. The Virginia General Assembly in 1810 issued a charter for a town at the intersection of Ashby Gap Road (which it authorized to be paved that year and later became Route 50) and the Dumfries-Winchester Road (which later became Route 17), although the town was actually platted two decades earlier (and not all of the 14 planned streets were ever completed).

Scheel tells us that this village was known as "Punkin Ville", which has nothing to do with pumpkins, but "punkin" was slang for an out-of-the-way and insignificant place. Hagemann tells us that in 1819 the town was named to memorialize the tour of the returning Marquis de Lafayette to the United States after the War of 1812. No written account explains why the place was not directly named after the Marquis, although Peter Glascock served in the Revolutionary Army and greatly admired him. Hagemann's account seems unlikely in light of both the creation of the Paris US Post Office and the assignment of a postmaster/mail routes in 1800, and the town was created in 1810 in a place that was already called Paris.

The market town prospered in the early 19th century (with a population of 200 in 1835) but lagged in the middle of the century because none of the newly constructed railroads went through it. It was last listed as an incorporated town in 1830. In 1835, Paris had several taverns, three stores, a school, and a church shared by several denominations as well as 25 dwellings, 2 saddlers, 2 blacksmiths, 2 wagonmakers, a tailor, a cabinetmaker, a chairmaker, a turner, a wheat fan maker, and three boot and shoe factories.

The Manassas Gap Railroad, constructed in 1852, went slightly south through nearby Marshall, Delaplane, and The Plains, Virginia, so Paris and its carting-based businesses declined. Because of its distance from the rail lines, the village saw little conflict during the American Civil War and was referred to in disparaging terms by both Confederate and Union writers. The population in 1880 was 134 persons in 22 households, including physicians, wheelwrights, blacksmiths, harness makers, tanners, shoemakers, carpenters, seamstresses and a bookkeeper and silversmith. The current Routes 17 and 50 were slightly rerouted outside the historic town (Ashby Gap turnpike was once the town's main street, and the old Ashby Hotel/tavern was destroyed in 1939 by a runaway truck coming down from the mountain).

The original Old Meetinghouse (built 1830 of brick) at 720 Republican Street was bequeathed by Peter Glasscock (who died in 1829). Multiple denominations used it before the American Civil War, and it became an African-American school late in the 19th century (and later a private residence). The Trinity United Methodist Church at 684 Federal Street, built by Henry S. Hanes in a Gothic Revival style in 1892–1893, as of 2011 was deconsecrated but available to host events. The regionally well known Ashby Inn is two doors from that church. In 1951, philanthropist Paul Mellon rebuilt Trinity Episcopal Church, once Meade Parish in nearby Upperville, and whose structure taken down on account of dampness in 1895 had again become decrepit, in a Gothic revival style.

The Paris Historic District has been listed on the National Register of Historic Places since 2004, and also constitutes the northern portion of the larger Crooked Run Valley Rural Historic District. Half the town's historic structures date from between 1810 and 1850 (including three log buildings dating from the 1820s and seven more frame buildings from the 1830s), with seven from the Reconstruction period after the American Civil War.

== Nearby attractions ==
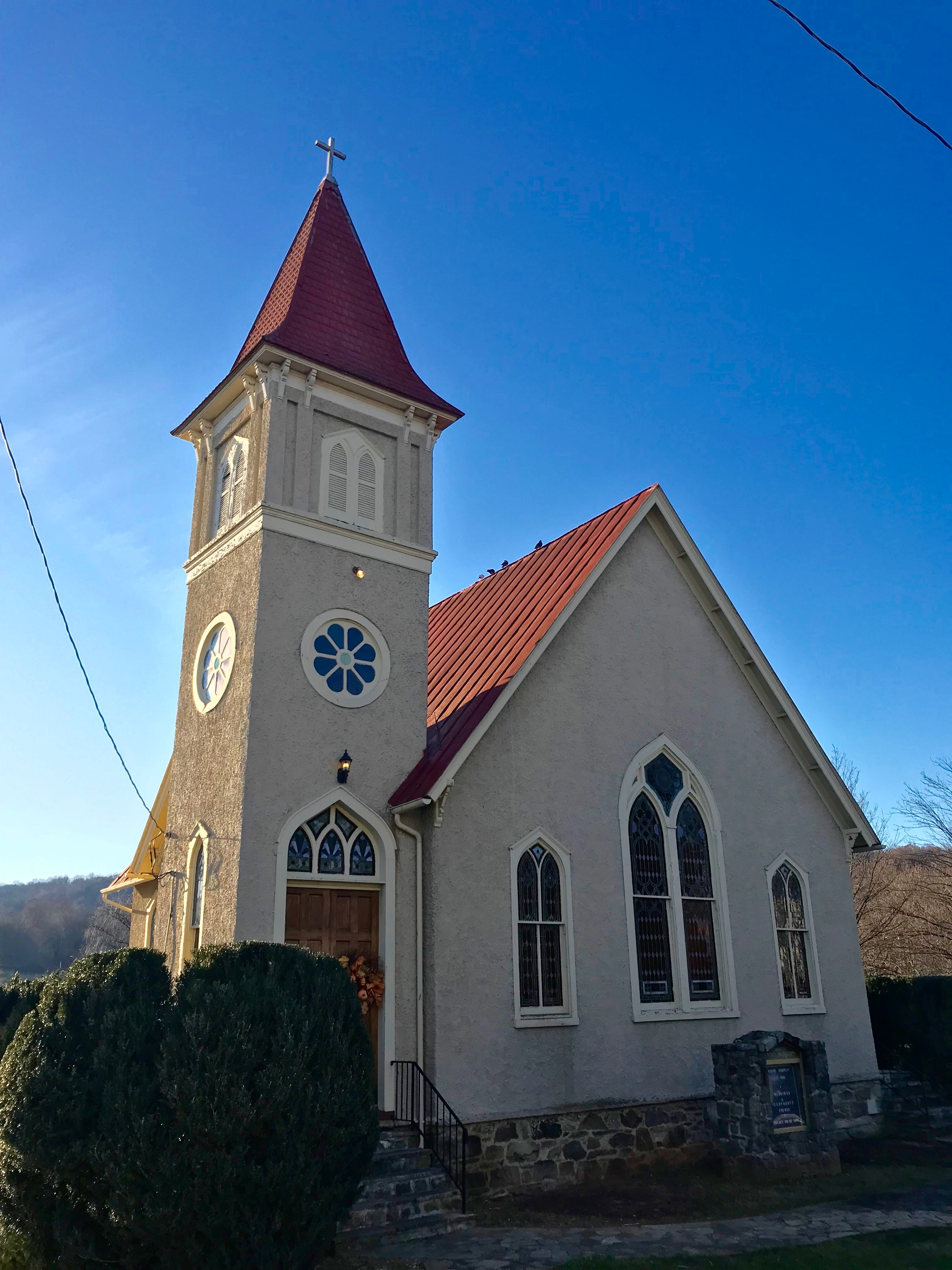
Trinity United Methodist Church

Paris is just north of Sky Meadows State Park and a ten-minute drive from the Thompson Wildlife Management Area. The Appalachian Trail passes through both of these public recreation areas. The village is in Hunt Country and celebrated its 200th anniversary on Dec. 28, 2010. A five-minute drive west on Route 50 is the Shenandoah River, just on the other side of the mountain, where there is a boat landing. The peak of the Blue Ridge overlooking Paris is called Ashby Gap. The view looking east from the gap has been deemed worthy of a "Scenic Easement," intended to keep this view clear and open for future generations to enjoy.

== Demographics ==
Paris first appeared as a census designated place in the 2020 U.S. census.
