= Piedmont Environmental Council =

American non-profit organization

- Founded: 1972 (54 years ago)
- Type: Nonprofit organization
- Headquarters: Warrenton, Virginia, United States
- Region served: Local, regional and state
- Key people: Christopher G. Miller (President)
- Website: pecva.org

The Piedmont Environmental Council (PEC) is a Virginia-based non-profit organization headquartered in Warrenton, Virginia, United States. Founded in 1972, it works across the Virginia Piedmont on land conservation and on issues including development, transportation, energy infrastructure, and rural land use.

The organization operates in a nine-county region that includes Albemarle, Clarke, Culpeper, Fauquier, Greene, Loudoun, Madison, Orange, and Rappahannock counties, as well as the city of Charlottesville.

== History and activities ==
The organization was formed in 1972 in response to development pressures in Fauquier County.

In the 1990s, the council was involved in opposition to the proposed Disney's America theme park in Prince William County.

The organization has participated in regional disputes over electric transmission lines and other infrastructure projects in northern Virginia.

In the 2020s, PEC has been involved in debates over the expansion of data centers in Fauquier County.

PEC has also been involved in land conservation through conservation easements, contributing to the protection of large areas of land in the region.

The organization is listed as an accredited land trust by the Land Trust Accreditation Commission.

== See also ==
- Conservation easement
- Land trust
- Environmental movement in the United States
