= Warrenton Historic District (Warrenton, Virginia) =

Historic district in Virginia, United States

- U.S. National Register of Historic Places
- U.S. Historic district
- Virginia Landmarks Register
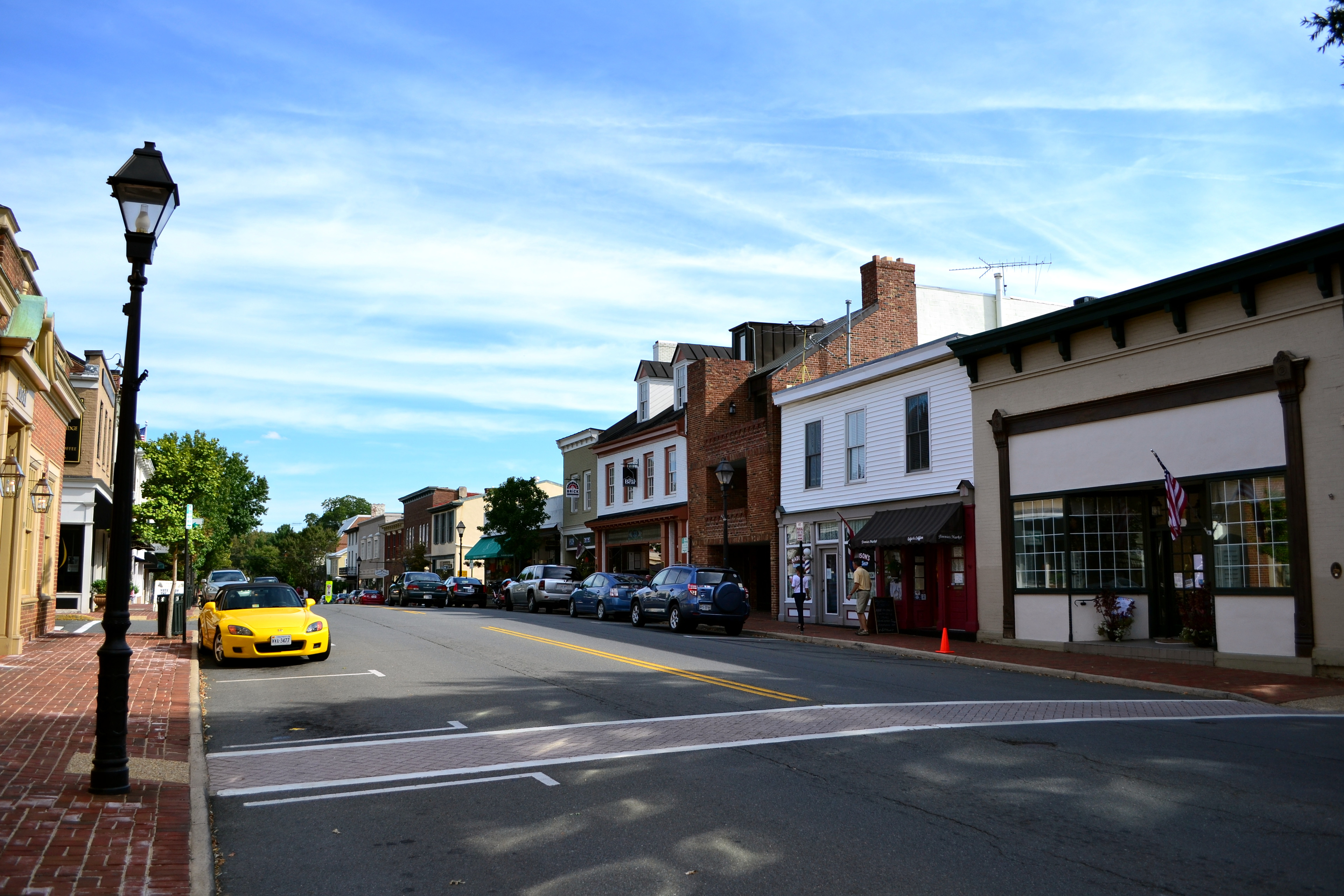
- Warrenton Historic District

- Location within Northern Virginia Location within Virginia Location within the United States
- Location: Roughly Main, Waterloo, Alexandria, Winchester, Culpeper, High, Falmouth, Lee, and Horner Sts., Warrenton, Virginia
- Coordinates: 38°42′40″N 77°47′35″W
- Area: 127 acres (51 ha)
- Architect: Multiple
- Architectural style: Late 19th And 20th Century Revivals, Late Victorian, Georgian Revival
- NRHP reference No.: 83004243 (original); 100010752 (increase)
- VLR No.: 156-0019

Significant dates
- Added to NRHP: October 13, 1983
- Boundary increase: August 27, 2024
- Designated VLR: August 16, 1983

Warrenton Historic District is a national historic district located at Warrenton, Fauquier County, Virginia. When originally listed, it encompassed 288 contributing buildings in the central business district and surrounding residential areas of the county seat of Warrenton. Notable buildings include the old Fauquier County courthouse (1890), Fauquier County Administration Building (1928), the former Fauquier County Public Library (1923), Fauquier National Bank (1925), "Paradise" (1758), the Thomas L. Moore House (1816), the James Caldwell House (1831), the John Quincy Marr House (1830), the Marshall Building (c. 1820), the California Building (c. 1850), old Town Hall (1854), Warrenton Presbyterian Church (1855), Ullman's Store, and "Mecca" (1859). Also located on the district are the separately listed Brentmoor and Old Fauquier County Jail.

It was listed on the National Register of Historic Places in 1972, with a boundary increase in 2024.

The nonprofit Experience Old Town Warrenton is an accredited organization by the National Main Street Program, located in the Warrenton Historic District. The nonprofit's mission is to foster and inspire an environment in Old Town Warrenton that enhances economic vitality while preserving the historic character of the community; and to promote a rich and appealing cultural atmosphere to live, play and do business.

== Gallery ==
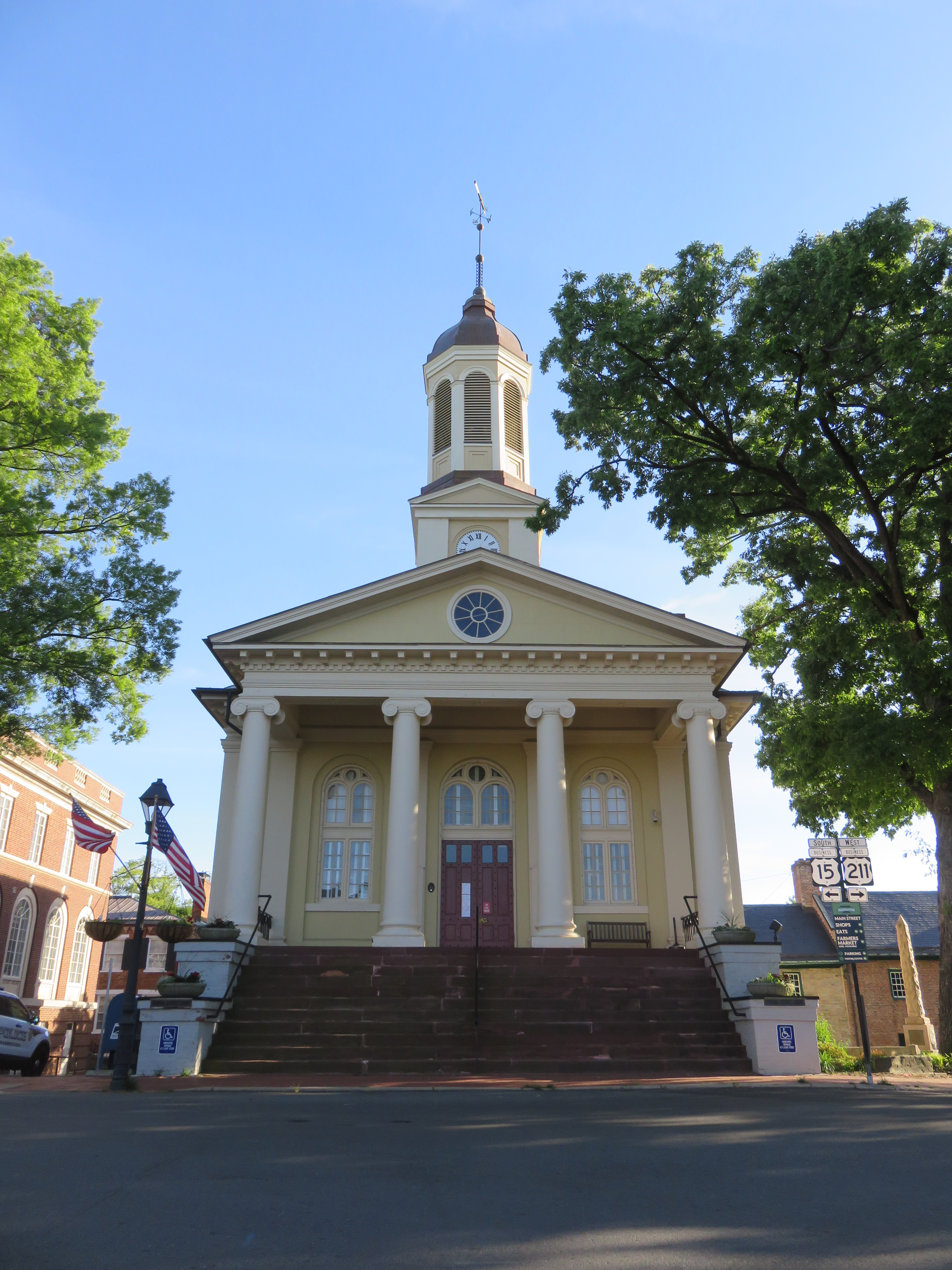
Fauquier County Courthouse

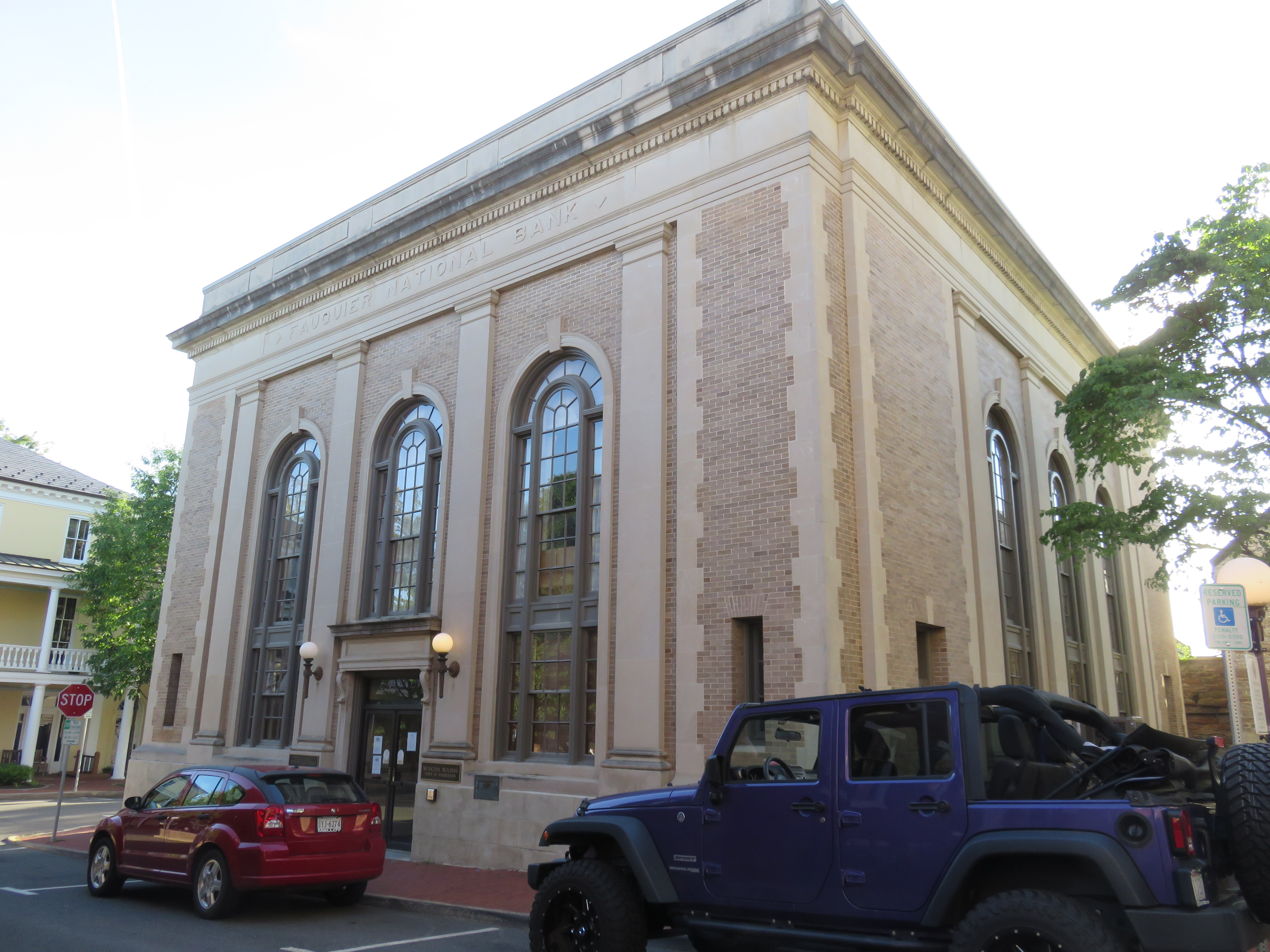
Fauquier National Bank, now Warrenton Municipal Building

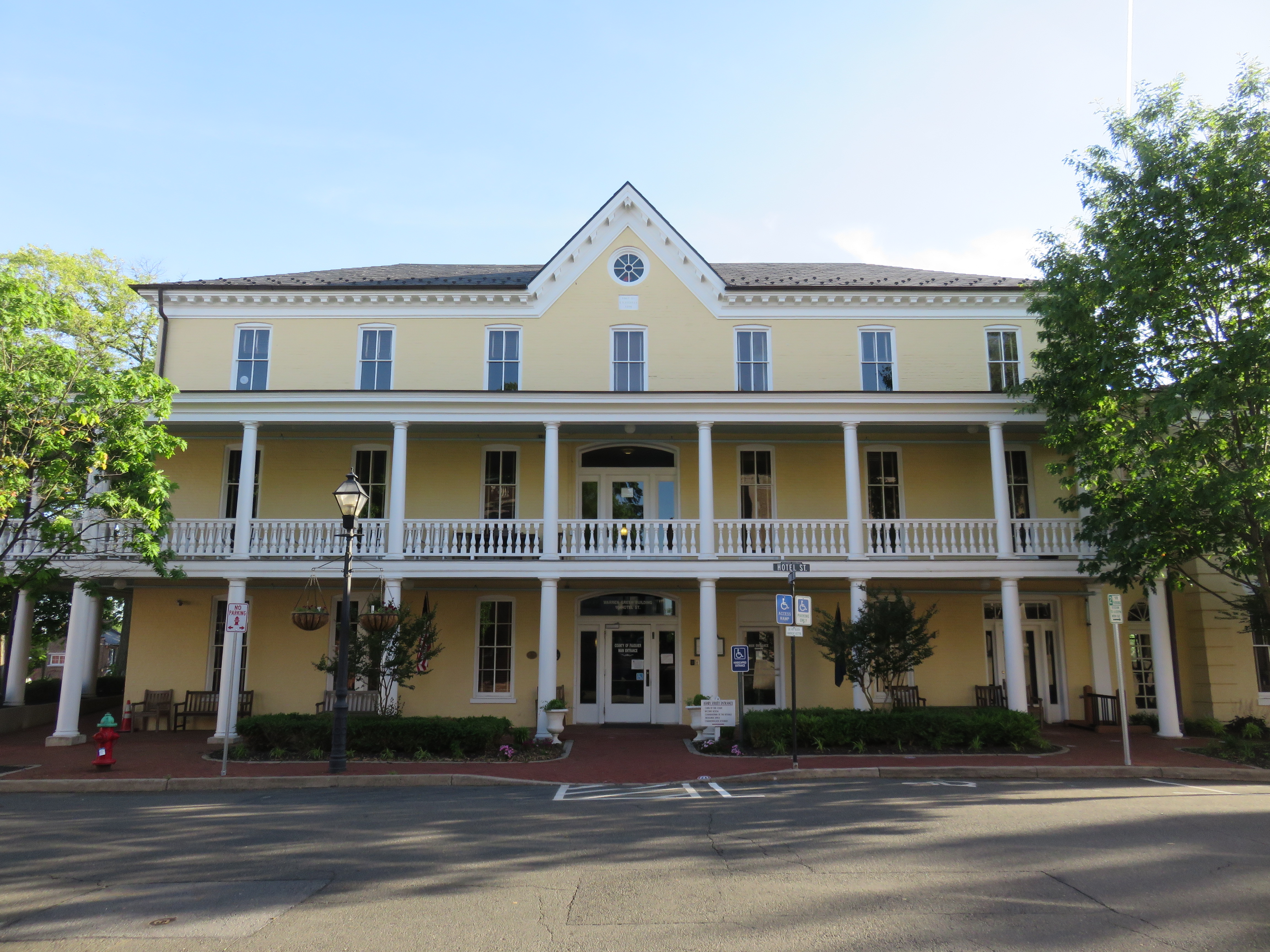
Former Warren Green Hotel

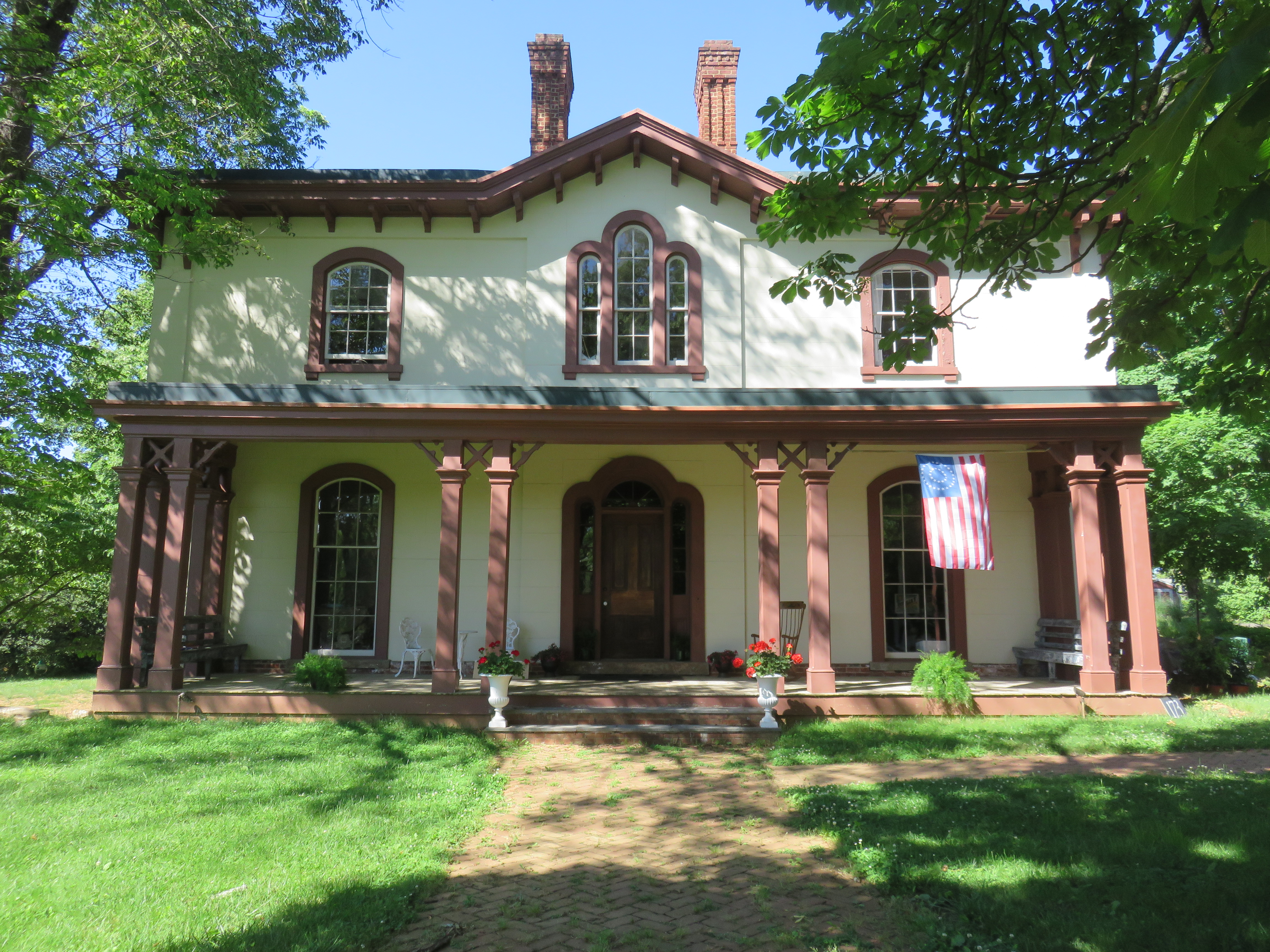
Brentmoor

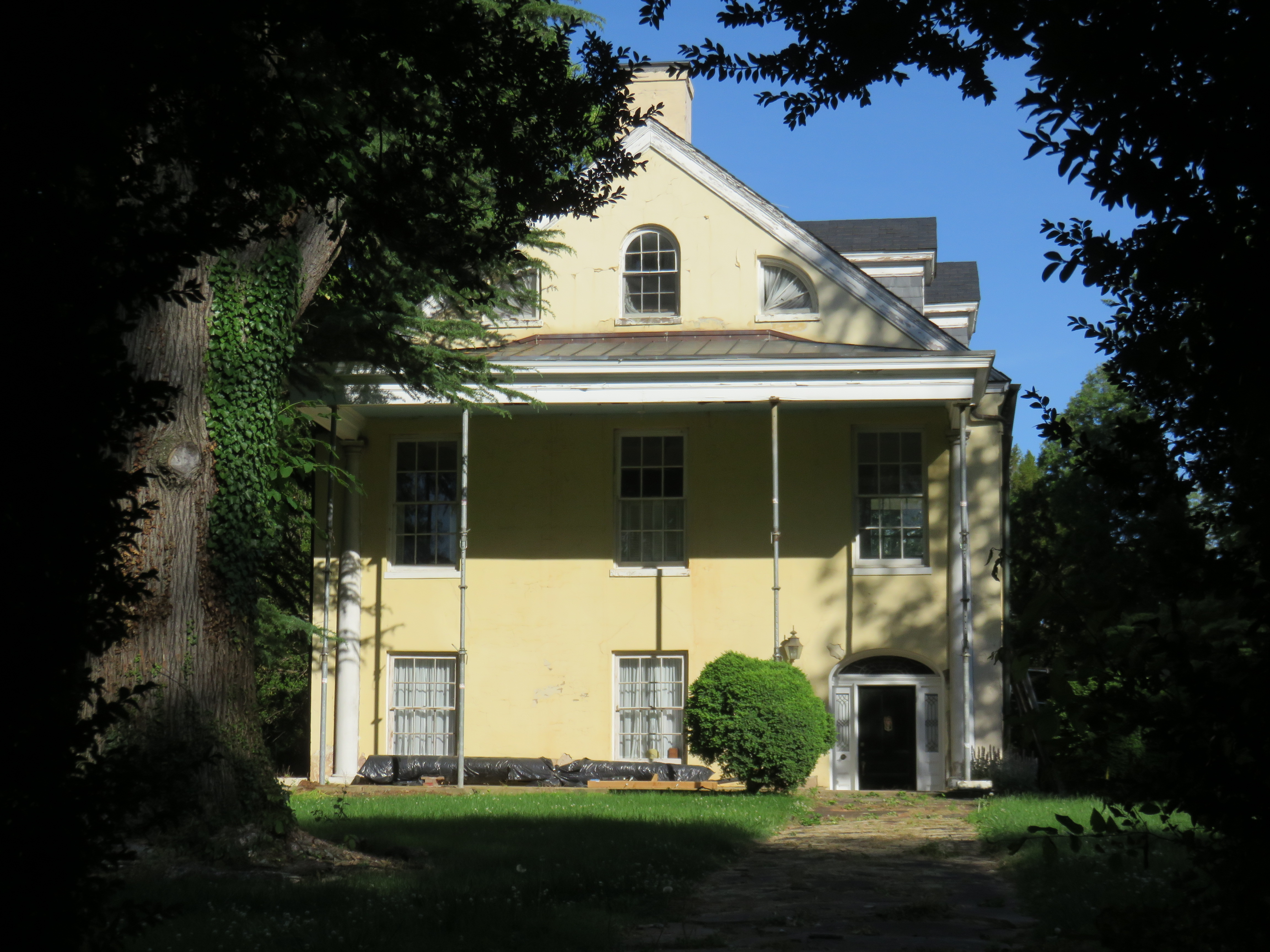
Monterosa
