= Warren Green Hotel =

Coordinates: 38°42′48.13″N 77°47′44.81″W

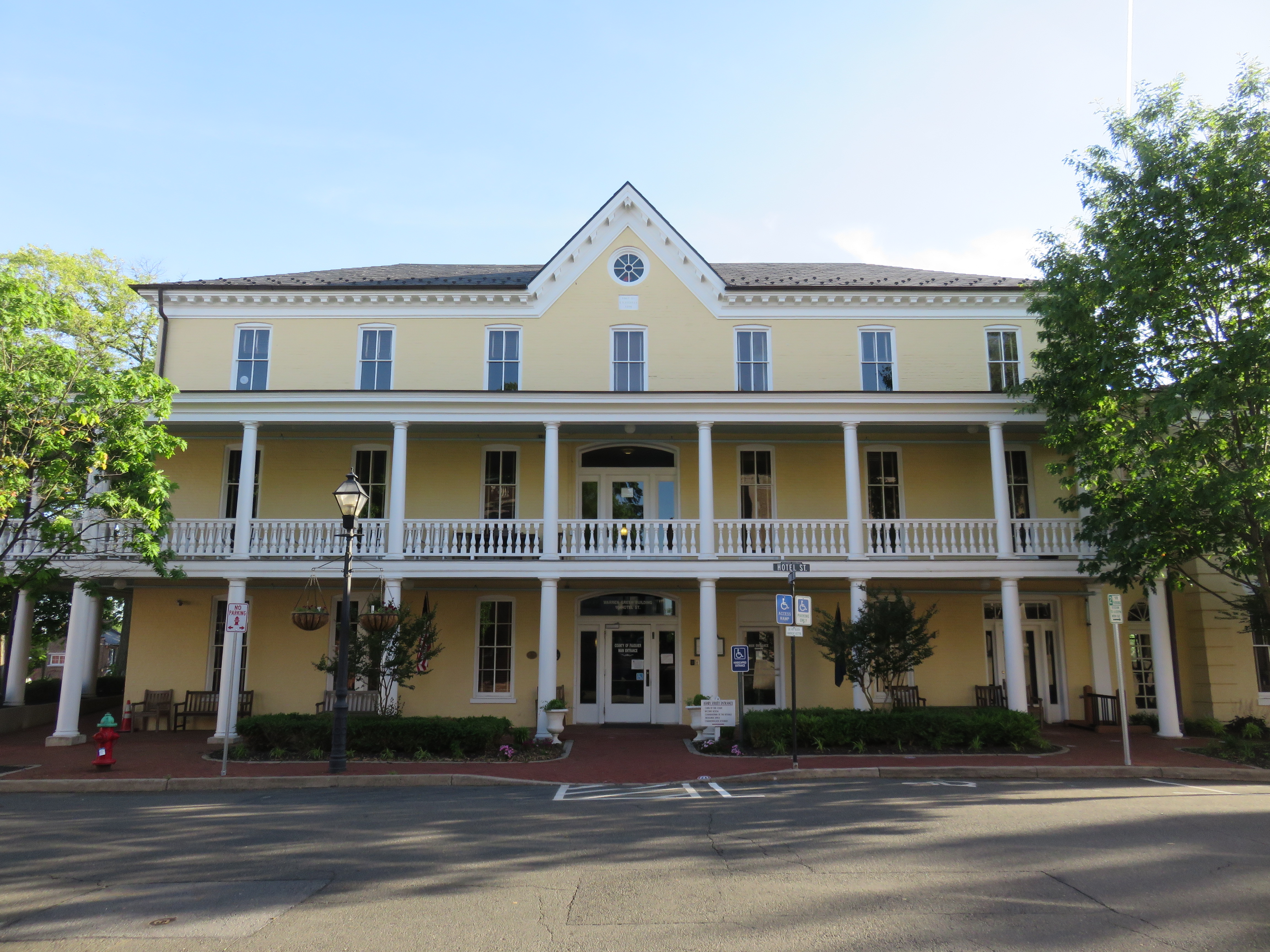
- Interactive map of Warren Green Hotel

History
- Built: 1819
- Rebuilt: 1876

Site notes
- Architect: John R. Spilman
- Architectural style: Italianate
- Restored by: G.B. Cochran
- Governing body: Fauquier County government

U.S. National Register of Historic Places
- Official name: Warren Green Hotel
- Designated: August 27, 2024
- Part of: Warrenton Historic District
- Reference no.: 83004243

Virginia Landmarks Register
- Official name: Warren Green Hotel
- Designated: March 21, 2024
- Reference no.: 156-0019-0355

The Warren Green Hotel, also called the Warren Green Building or The Little Waldorf, is a historic building within the historic district of the Warrenton, Virginia. The building was originally built in 1819, then rebuilt in 1876 after a fire while operated as an independent hotel until purchased by the Fauquier County government in 1960. It is currently used as a county administrative and public meeting building.

== History ==
Prior to the Warren Green Hotel, the site was home to the Norris Tavern. Built by Thaddeus Norris in 1819, this tavern was later converted into the hotel. This original structure hosted numerous notable events, including one stop of General Lafayette's Farewell Tour.

Following its destruction in an 1874 fire, the property was rebuilt in 1876 by local architect John R. Spilman. Spilman also designed and built other notable local buildings such as the current Fauquier County Courthouse. An annex of this new structure burned down again in 1909 town-wide fire; however, the main structure survived.

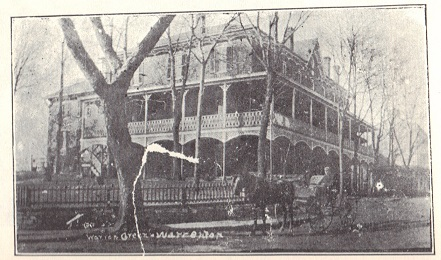
1908 sketch of the Warren Green Building

In 1909, President Theodore Roosevelt stopped at the Warren Green Hotel while on a round-trip military training ride from Washington, D.C. to Warrenton, V.A. and back. During this stop, Roosevelt gave an address to more than one thousand individuals from the balcony of the building.

The hotel often accommodated guests who visited Warrenton for the Gold Cup Races, a local horse race. From 1924 to1926, Wallis Warfield Spencer lived on the second floor of the hotel as a method to obtain a divorce from her then-husband. She would later become the Duchess of Windsor.

Following World War II, the hotel experience a gradual decline in visitors. Due in-part to this, the local County government purchased the hotel building in 1960. Since then, the facility has been used for numerous administrative purposes.

In 2025, the County government began exploring a possible sale of the building. In 2026, it was announced that the Fauquier County government intended to sell the building to a hotel chain. This was done as a part of a series of property acquisitions and releases by the County in the 2020s, including the purchase of the Courthouse Square Center. A non-binding agreement to sell the building to Madison Dale Construction LLC was approved by the Fauquier county supervisors.

== Notable Guests ==
- Marquis de Lafayette
- George B. McClellan
- Ned Buntline
- Theodore Roosevelt
- Wallis Warfield Spencer
