= Warren Green =

Warren Green may refer to:

- Warren Green (South Dakota politician)
- Warren Green (Oklahoma politician)
- Warren Green (tennis)

== See also ==
- Warren Green Hotel, Warrenton, Virginia
- Christopher Warren-Green, British violinist and conductor
