= Paradise (Warrenton, Virginia) =

Historic house in Virginia, United States

- U.S. National Register of Historic Places
- U.S. Historic district – Contributing property
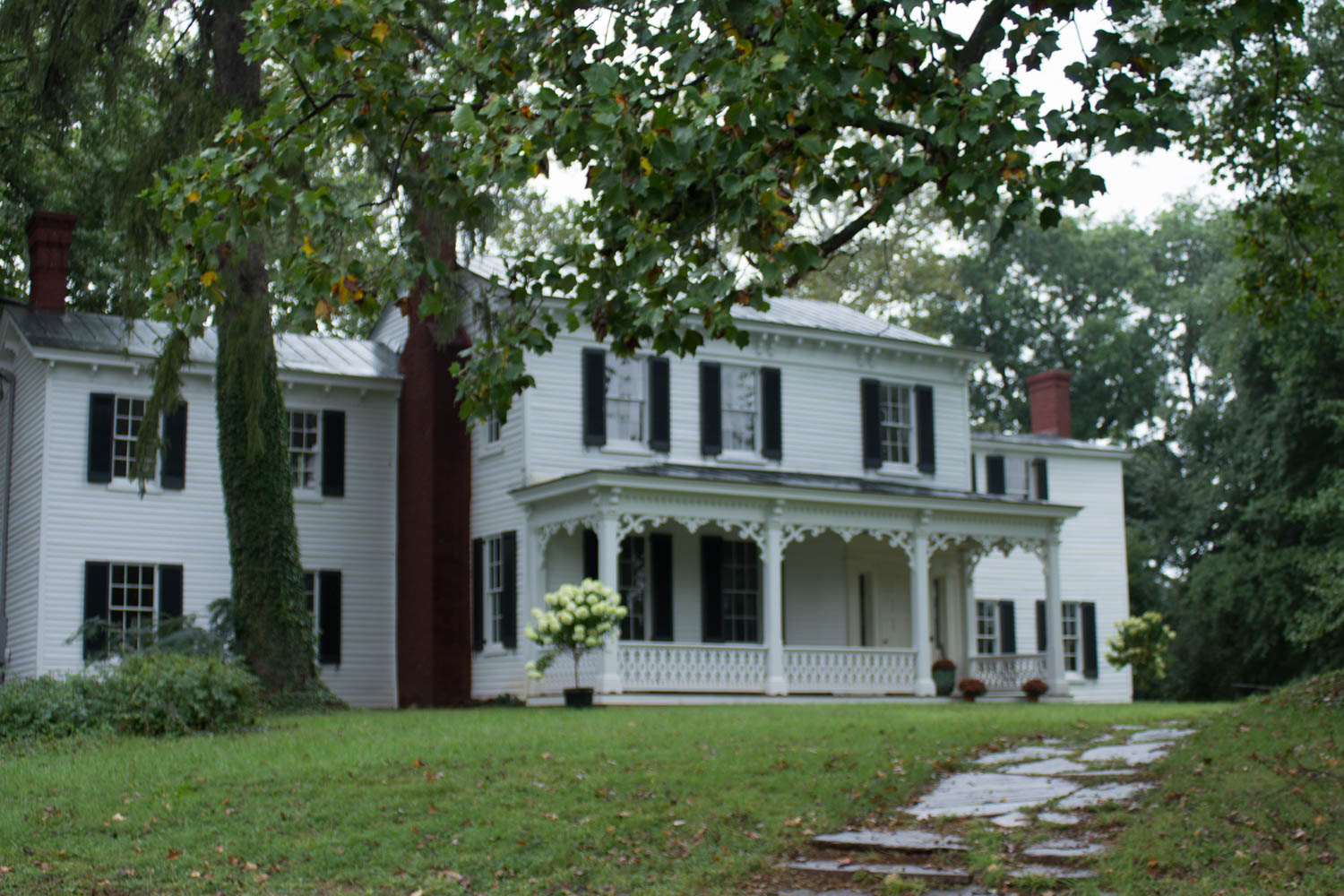

- Location within Northern Virginia Location within Virginia Location within the United States
- Location: 158 Winchester St., Warrenton, Virginia
- Coordinates: 38°43′2″N 77°47′56″W
- Area: 1.6 acres (0.65 ha)
- Built: c. 1758
- Architectural style: Federal; Italianate; Folk Victorian
- Part of: Warrenton Historic District (ID83004243)
- NRHP reference No.: 14000147

Significant dates
- Added to NRHP: April 11, 2014
- Designated CP: October 13, 1983

Paradise is a historic house at 158 Winchester Street in Warrenton, Virginia. The oldest portion of this two story timber-frame house was built c. 1758, and is believed to be the oldest building in Warrenton. The central block of the house is three bays, with a side passage plan. It is flanked on either side by two-story wood frame wings. The house exterior was extensively redecorated in 1870, adding a full-width porch and substantial Italianate and Folk Victorian woodwork.

The house was listed on the National Register of Historic Places in 2014; it is a contributing element of the Warrenton Historic District, listed in 1983.

== See also ==
- National Register of Historic Places listings in Fauquier County, Virginia
