= Ullman's Store =

Ullman Department Stores
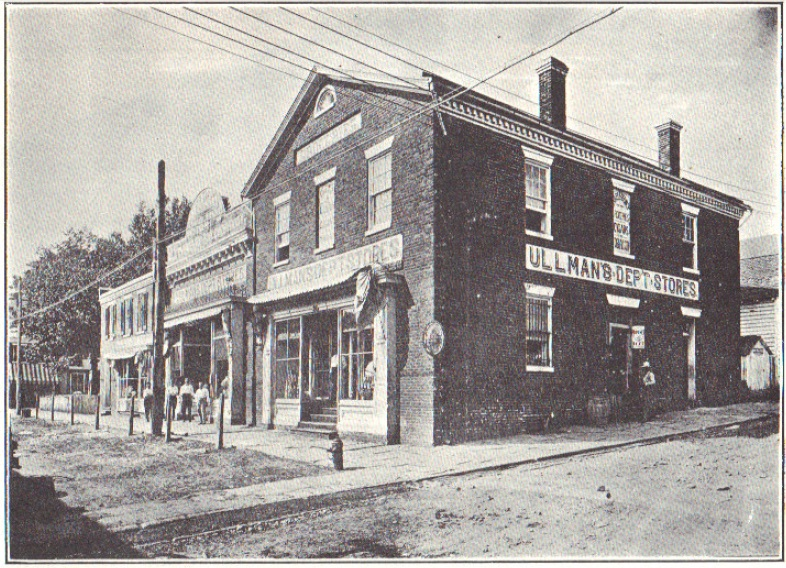
- Location: 51-53 E Lee St Warrenton, VA 20186

History
- Built: 1852

Site notes
- Architectural style: Greek Revival
- Restored: 1919
- Owner: Warrenton Realty Co, Inc.

U.S. Historic district – Contributing property
- Official name: Ullman's Store
- Designated: October 13, 1983
- Part of: Warrenton Historic District
- Reference no.: 83004243

Virginia Landmarks Register
- Official name: Ullman's Store
- Designated: August 16, 1983
- Part of: Warrenton Historic District
- Reference no.: 156-0019-165; 156-0019-166; 156-0019-167

The Ullman's Store, also called the Ullman Building is a series of three interconnected buildings in Warrenton, Virginia, that were formerly integrated into a single department store owned and operated by local Ullman family.

== History ==
=== Ullman Store ===
The store was originally established in 1841 by Adolph Ullman and his father-in-law Abraham Rindsberg. Following Adolph Ullman's death, his wife Caroline Ullman operated the store. Caroline "Carrie" Ullman is largely credited for turning the store into one of Warrenton's largest and longest-lasting storefronts.

While in operation, the three individual buildings of the Ullman Department Stores each served a different purpose. The leftmost building served as a home goods and ceramics store, the central building served as a dry goods and clothing store, while the rightmost building served as a grocery and liquor store. During the American Civil War, John Barton Payne worked as a clerk at the Ullman store.

Herman E. Ullman owned and operated the department stores after inheriting it from his parents. The Ullman Department Stores operated through 1956 with a renovation in 1919.

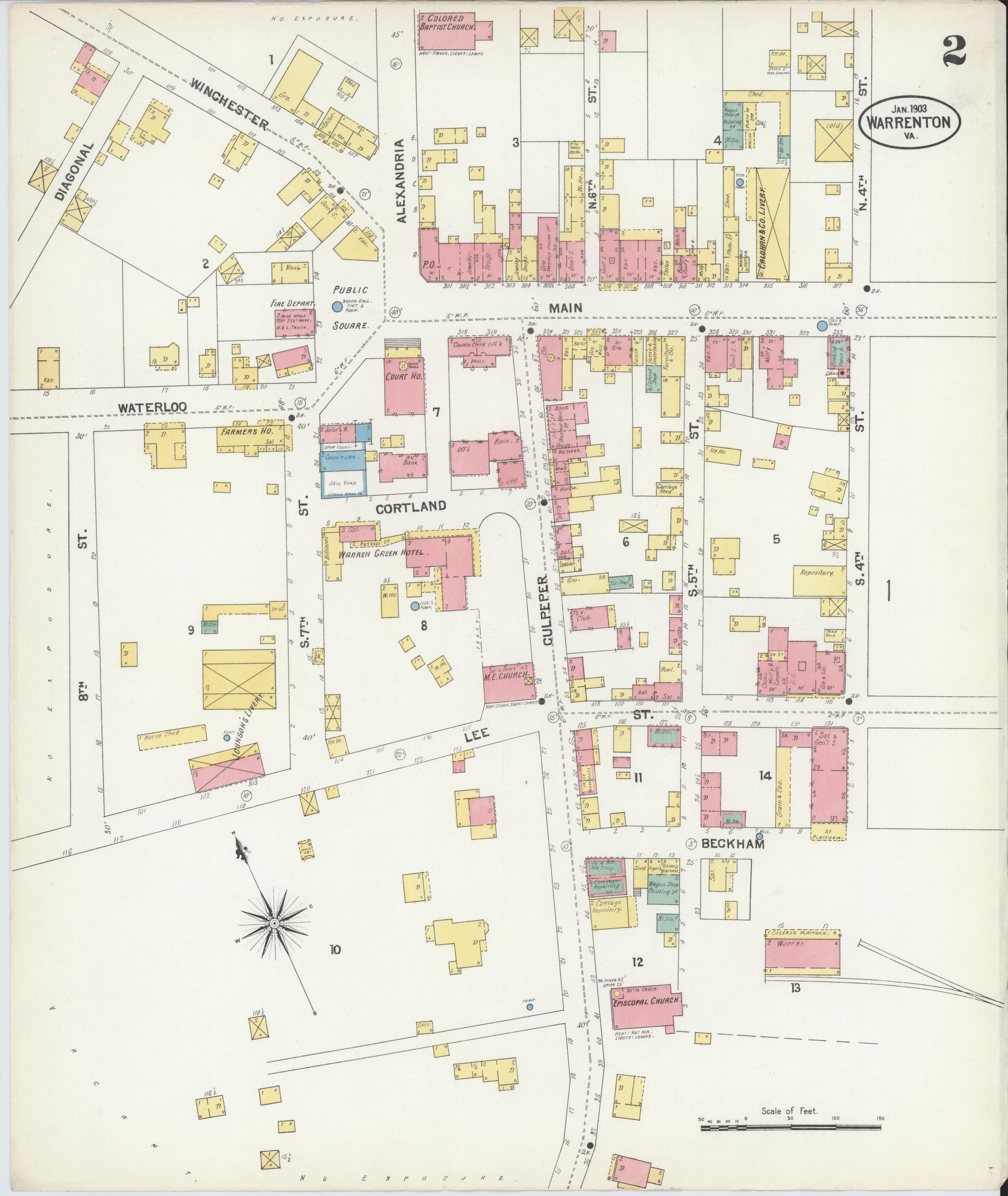
1903 Sanborn map of Warrenton, VA, with the Ullman Department Stores labeled as 113, 114, and 115.

=== Modern Usage ===
A stone marker with the name "Ullman's" was placed in the sidewalk to commemorate the business's impact on the surrounding community. The buildings have also housed music shops, a salon, and home-improvement stores since the closure of Ullman's Store.
