= Monterosa (Warrenton, Virginia) =

Historic house in Virginia, United States

- U.S. National Register of Historic Places
- Virginia Landmarks Register
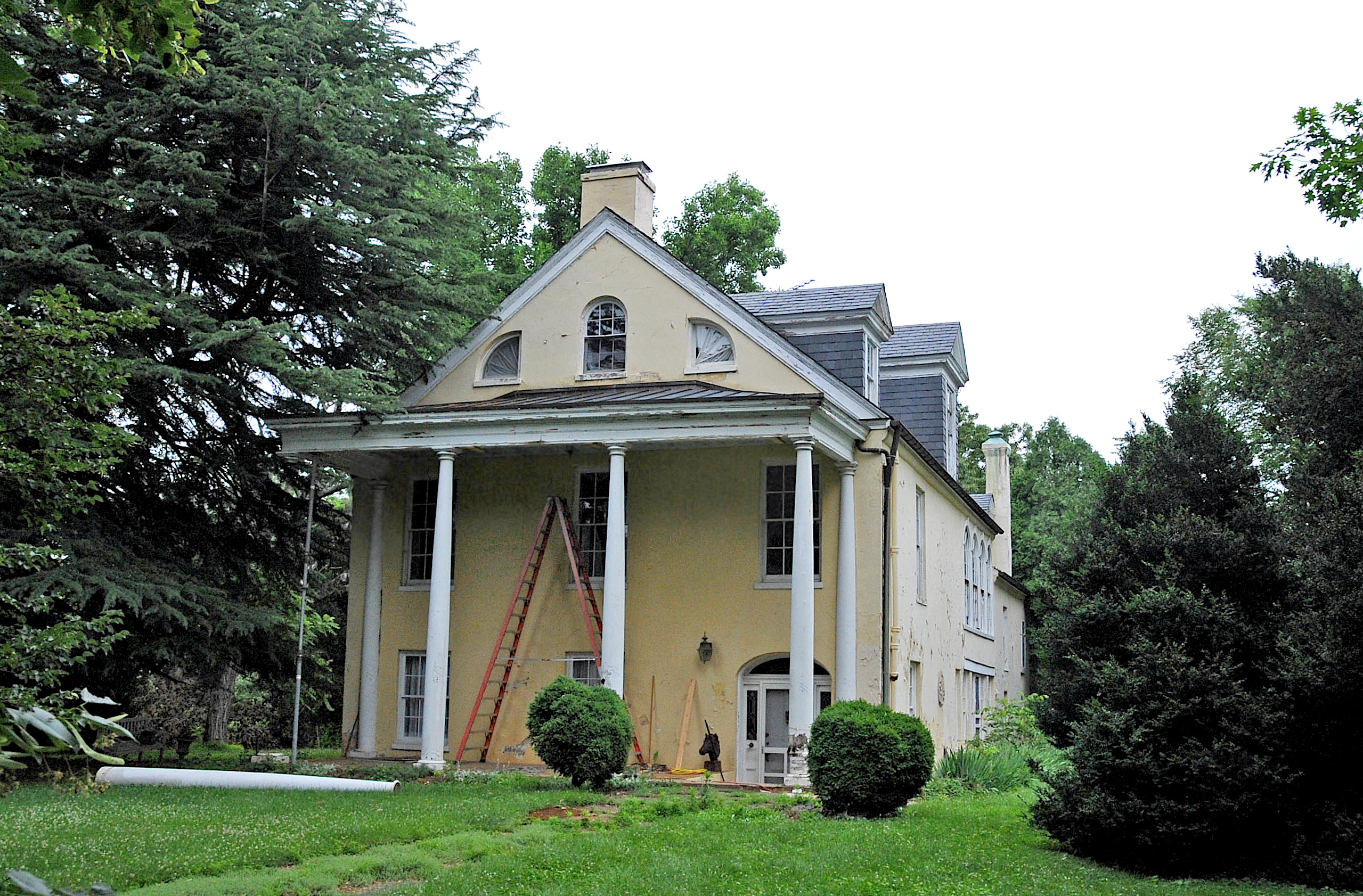

- Location within Northern Virginia Location within Virginia Location within the United States
- Location: 343 Culpeper St., Warrenton, Virginia, USA
- Coordinates: 38°42′27″N 77°48′01″W
- Area: 5.4 acres (2.2 ha)
- Built: 1847-1848
- Architectural style: Colonial Revival, Italianate
- NRHP reference No.: 90002193
- VLR No.: 156-0020

Significant dates
- Added to NRHP: January 25, 1991
- Designated VLR: June 19, 1990

Monterosa, also known as Monte Rosa or Neptune Lodge, is a historic home located in Warrenton, Virginia. The original house was constructed about 1847–1848, and is a 2 1/2-story, stuccoed brick house with a gable roof and side-passage plan.

== History ==
The house has sustained several periods of alteration and now manifests the proportions and details of the Colonial Revival style. Also on the property are the contributing Italianate style brick stable (c. 1847); a brick smokehouse; and a two-story single-pile dwelling that dates from the late-19th century and is known as the Office.

Monterosa was built from 1847 to 1848 as the Warrenton home of former Virginia Governor, Congressman, and Confederate General William "Extra Billy" Smith. Smith had various structures built including the main house, a brick smokehouse, and an Italianate brick stable used for the U.S. Postal Service.

During the American Civil War, the house changed hands between the Union and the Confederacy 67 times. This is largely due to the house's large size and strategic location along transportation routes.

The East Virginia Mineral and Warrenton Improvements Company purchased Monterosa from Smith's daughter, Mary Amelia Smith, in 1890 for $20,000 as part of a planned community south of Warrenton. Following the planned community's failure to materialize, Monterosa was sold to James Kerfoot Maddux in 1895 for $5,500.

Following his purchase, Maddux renamed the property to Neptune Lodge after one of his racehorses. Maddux made renovations to the property adding Colonial Revival elements such as the porch. In 1930, Winifred May Maddux sold the property after inheriting it from her father. It has been privately owned since.

Monterosa was added to the Virginia Landmarks Register in 1990. It was listed on the National Register of Historic Places in 1991.

In 2024, the Warrenton Historic District was expanded to include various properties including Monterosa. Later in 2024, the Town of Warrenton used Monterosa along with other historic buildings as justification for a code change allowing fines for neglectful property owners. The Town specifically referenced the property's missing windows and overgrown lot.
