= Fauquier County Courthouse =

Coordinates: 38.713702°N 77.795683°W

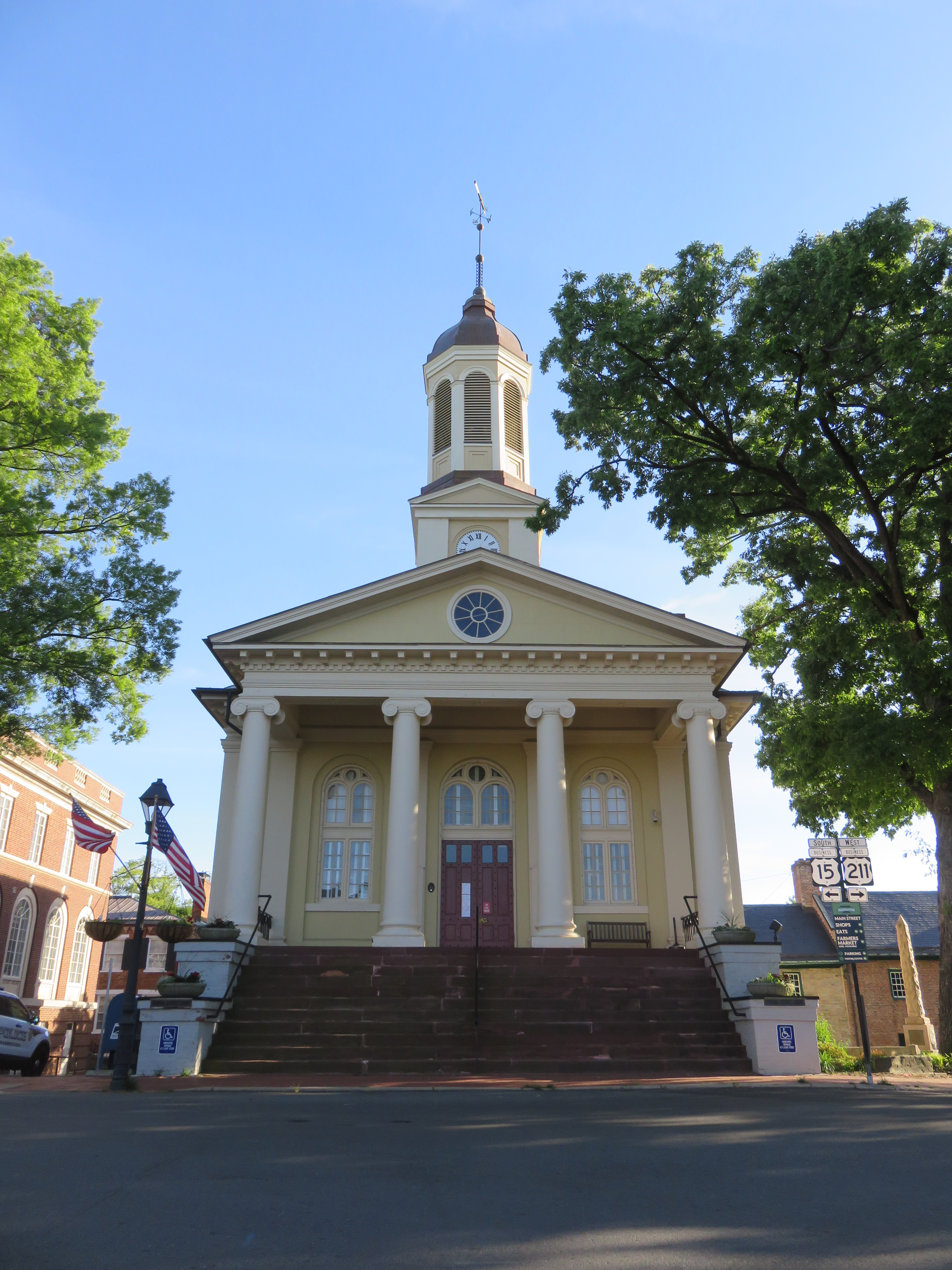
- Interactive map of Fauquier County Courthouse
- Location: 6 Court St Warrenton, VA 20186

History
- Built: 1795
- Rebuilt: 1818; 1854; 1890 (136 years ago)

Site notes
- Architect: John R. Spilman
- Architectural styles: Classical Revival; Greek Revival
- Restored by: William H. Baldwin; Albert Fletcher
- Governing body: Fauquier County General District Court of the 20th Judicial District

U.S. Historic district – Contributing property
- Official name: Fauquier County Courthouse
- Designated: 1983-10-13
- Part of: Warrenton Historic District
- Reference no.: 83004243

Virginia Landmarks Register
- Official name: Fauquier County Courthouse
- Designated: 1983-08-16
- Part of: Warrenton Historic District
- Reference no.: 156-0019-0351

The Fauquier County Courthouse, also called the Old Courthouse, is a historic building within the historic district of the Warrenton, Virginia. The courthouse was originally located near the Town cemetery, but was relocated to the current location in 1795. Since then, four iterations of the courthouse have been built, with the current structure having been completed in 1890.

The courthouse is often seen as the architectural focal point of the Warrenton Historic District.

== History ==
The original courthouse, constructed in 1759, was built to serve as the county seat of the newly formed Fauquier County. A more permanent courthouse modelled after Lancaster County's courthouse was built from 1760 to 1762 on land formerly belonging to Richard Henry Lee by John Bell. In 1795, the courthouse was relocated to its current location.

A third courthouse built in its current Greek revivalist style was designed and constructed in the same location by John R. Spilman in 1818 for $18,000; however, this structure suffered fire damage in 1853 from a believed act of arson and in 1889 from a fire caused by an election day firework display.

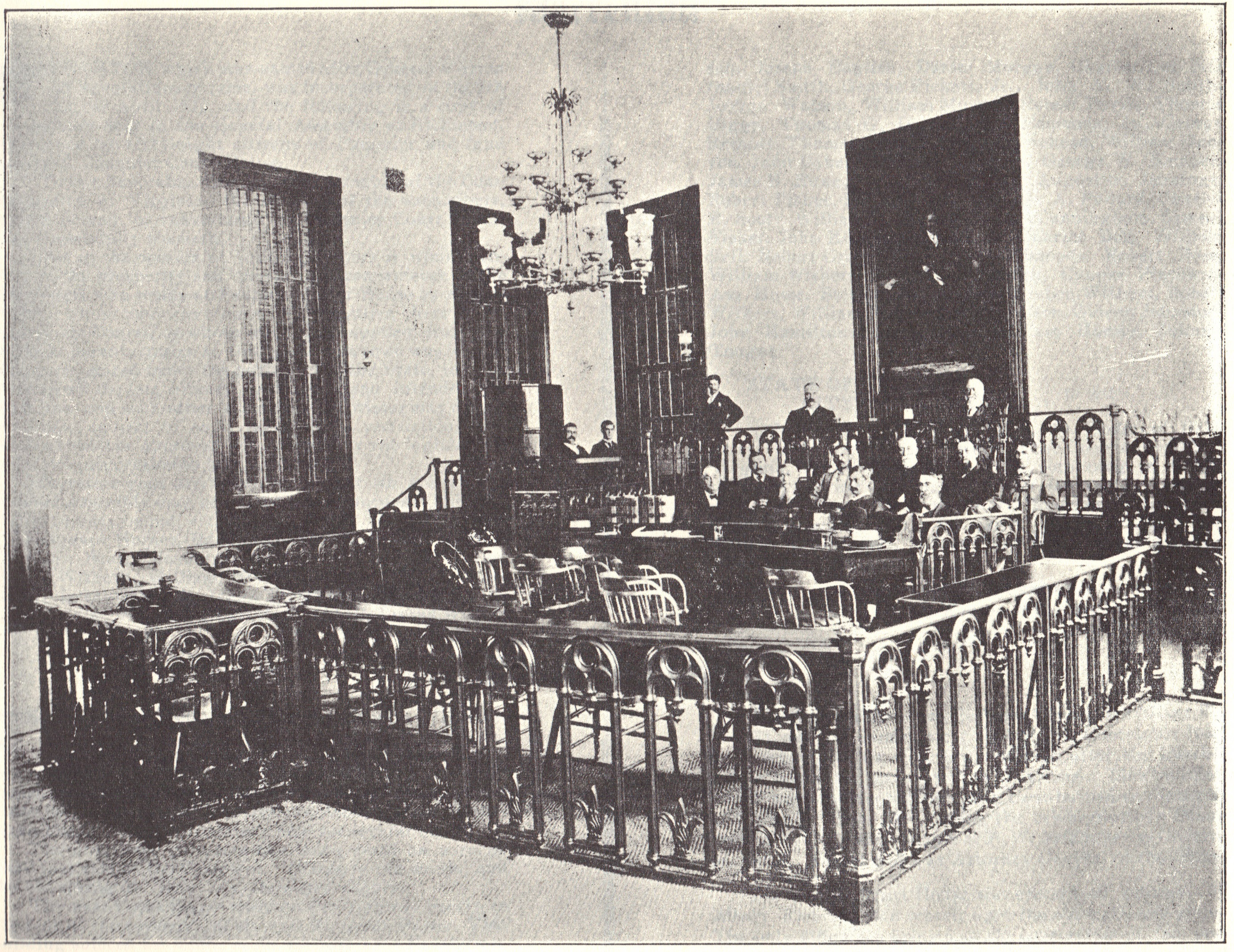
Interior of the Old Courthouse when first built.

The current courthouse was designed and restored by William H. Baldwin and Albert Fletcher as a near-replica of the 1818 courthouse and completed in 1890. This construction utilized the still-intact walls of the previous structure.

Largely due to the limited space within the 1890 courthouse, a new courthouse was built nearby in 1974 with most judicial operations having relocated to this new facility.

In 2018, the court's clocktower was repaired. This job largely focused on rotting wood within the bell tower's walls and exterior paint.

== Notable events ==
- August 3, 1825, General Lafayette welcoming address.
- November 5, 1889, fire caused by a firework display caused the structure to burn down. This display was to celebrate a Democratic victory in the 1889 Virginia gubernatorial election.
- July 7, 2025, Google used a photo of the old courthouse in a full-page Wall Street Journal ad for artificial intelligence.
