= Ned Buntline bibliography =

American dime-novel author

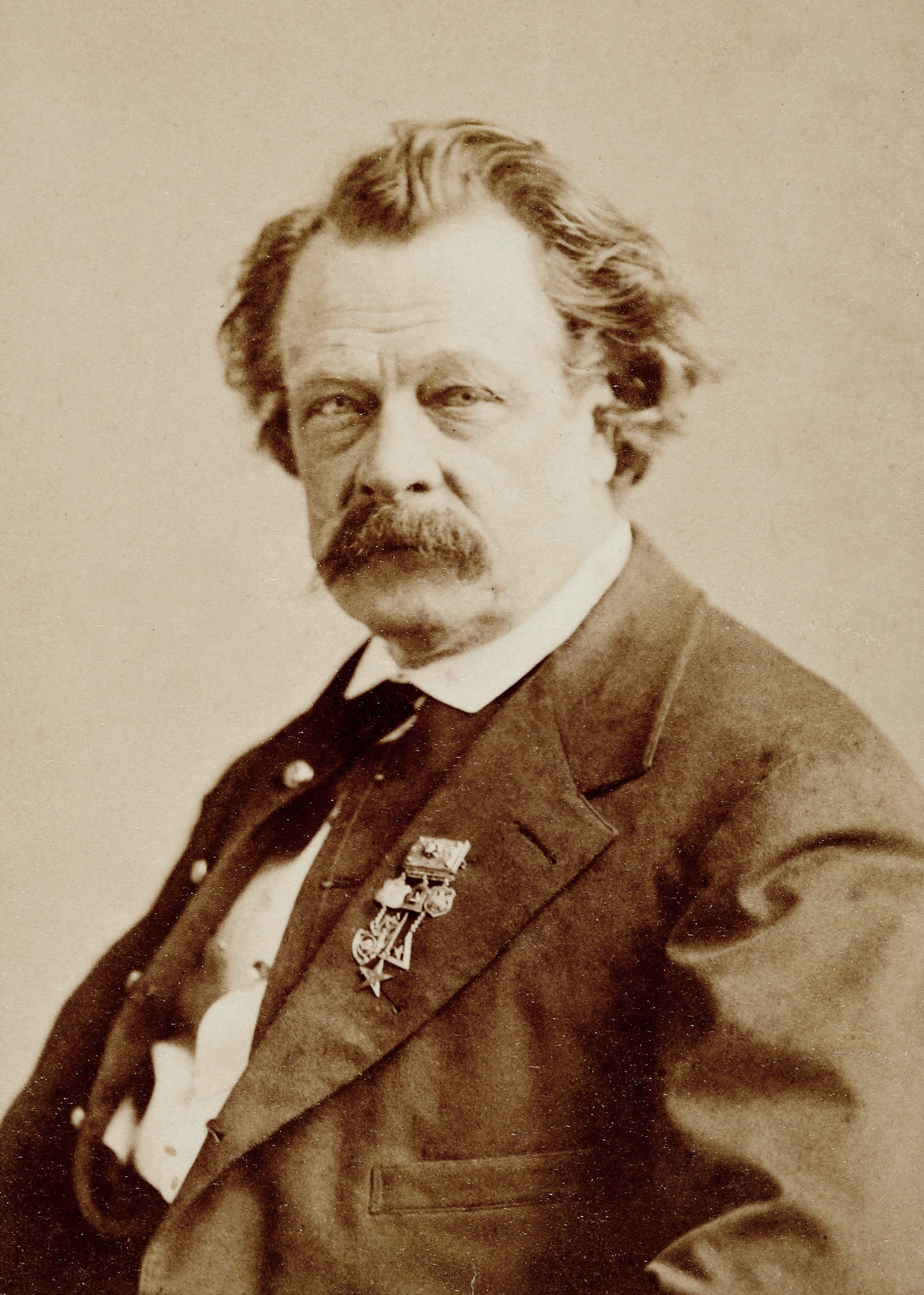

The following is a list of works by American dime novel author Edward Zane Carroll Judson commonly known by his pen name Ned Buntline. (Note: Dime novels were either published under the pseudonym Ned Buntline or E. Z. C. Judson.)

== Dime novels ==
- Magdalena, the Beautiful Mexican Maid: A Story of Buena Vista. New York: Williams Bros, 1846.
- The Curse!: A Tale of Crime and Its Retribution, Founded on Facts of Real Life. Boston: Roberts & Garfield, 1847.
- Bellamira; Or, the Last Days of Callao: An Historical Romance of Peru. Boston: Star Spangled Banner Office, 1847.
- The Volunteer: Or, the Maid of Monterey: a Tale of the Mexican War. Boston: F. Gleason, 1847.
- The Black Avenger of the Spanish Main, Or, the Fiend of Blood: A Thrilling Story of the Buccaneer Times. Boston: Gleason, 1847.
- Matanzas; Or, a Brother's Revenge: A Tale of Florida. Boston: G.H. Williams, 1848.
- Love's Desperation, Or, the President's Only Daughter: And Other Tales. Boston: F. Gleason, 1848.
- Cruisings, Afloat and Ashore: From the Private Log of Ned Buntline Sketches of Land and Sea, Humorous and Pathetic, Tragical and Comical. New York: R. Craighead, 1848.
- The Red Revenger, Or, the Pirate King of the Floridas; a Romance of the Gulf and Its Islands. Boston: F. Gleason, Flag of Our Union Office, 1848.
- The Ice King, Or, the Fate of the Lost Steamer: A Fanciful Tale of the Far North. Boston: George H. Williams, 1848.
- The King of the Sea: Tale of the Fearless and Free. New York: Samuel French, 1848.

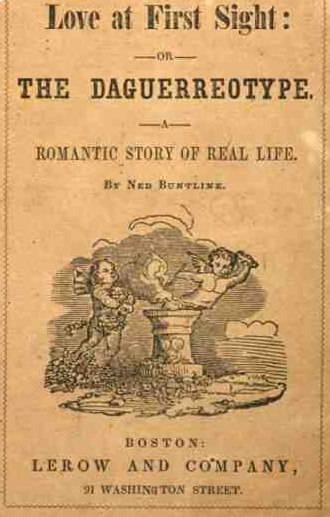

- Love at First Sight, Or, the Daguerreotype: A Romantic Story of Real Life. Boston: Jone's Pub. House, 1849.
- Three Years After: A Sequel to the Mysteries and Miseries of New York. New York: Burgess, 1849.
- Working Men, Shall Americans or English Rule in This City?. New York, 1849.
- The B'hoys of New York: A Sequel to the Mysteries and Miseries of New York. New York: Dick & Fitzgerald, 1850.
- The G'hals of New York: A Novel. New York: Dewitt and Davenport, 1850.
- The Virgin of the Sun: A Historical Romance of the Last Revolution in Peru. London: Newman, 1850.
- The Mysteries and Miseries of New York: A Story of Real Life. New York: Dick & Fitzgerald, 1851.
- The White Cruiser, Or, the Fate of the Unheard-of: A Tale of Land and Sea: of Crime and Mystery. New York: Garrett, 1853.
- The Wheel of Misfortune; Or, the Victims of Lottery and Policy Dealers: A Yarn from the Web of New York Life. New York: Garrett & Co, 1853.
- The Jesuit's Daughter: A Novel for Americans to Read. New York: Burgess & Day, 1854.
- The Mysteries and Miseries of New Orleans. Philadelphia: T.B. Peterson & Bros, 1854.
- The Pale Lily; Or, the Young Bride's Honey Moon: A Tale of Border Life and Savage Cruelty. New York: Garrett & Co, 1855.
- The Queen of the Sea; Or, Our Lady of the Ocean: A Tale of Love and Chivalry. Novelette. 1855.
- The Red Right Hand: A Tale of Indian Warfare. New York: Dick & Fitzgerald, 1857.
- Luona Prescott, Or, the Curse Fulfilled: A Tale of the American Revolution. New York, 1858.
- Thayendanegea, the Scourge: Or, the Wareagle of the Mohawks : a Tale of Mystery, Ruth, and Wrong. New York: F.A. Brady, 1858.
- The Shell-Hunter: Or, an Ocean Love-Chase, a Romance of Land and Sea. New York: F.A. Brady, 1858.
- English Tom: Or, the Smuggler's Secret: a Tale of Ship and Shore. New York: F.A. Brady, 1858.
- The White Wizard: Or, the Great Prophet of the Seminoles: a Tale of Strange Mystery in the South and North. New York: F.A. Brady, 1858.
- Our Mess: Or, the Pirate-Hunters of the Gulf: a Tale of Naval Heroism and Wild Adventure in the Tropics. New York: F.A. Brady, 1859.
- Seawaif: Or, the Terror of the Coast: a Tale of Privateering in 1776. New York: F.A. Brady, 1859.
- Ned Buntline's Life Yarn. New York: Dick & Fitzgerald, 1860.
- Saul Sabberday; or the Idiot Spy. New York: Brady, 1860.
- Stella Delorme, Or, the Comanche's Dream: A Wild and Fanciful Story of Savage Chivalry. New York: F.A. Brady, 1860.
- Norwood; Or, Life on the Prairie. New York: Dick & Fitzergald, 1860.
- Elfrida, the Red Rover's Daughter: A New Mystery of New York. New York: F.A. Brady, 1860.
- Morgan, Or, the Knight of the Black Flag: A Strange Story of By-Gone Times. New York: F.A. Brady, 1861.
- The Man-O'-War's-Man's Grudge: A Romance of the Revolution. New York: F.A. Brady, 1861.
- The Death-Mystery: A Crimson Tale of Life in New York. New York: F.A. Brady, 1861.
- Hilliare Henderson, Or, the Secret Revealed: An Antecedent to "The Death Mystery". New York: F.A. Brady, 1862.
- Ella Adams: Or, the Demon of Fire : a Tale of the Charleston Conflagration. New York: F.A. Brady, 1862.
- The Grossbeak Mansion: A Mystery of New York. New York: F.A. Brady, 1862.
- The Last of the Buccaneers: A Yarn of the Eighteenth Century. New York: Dick & Fitzgerald, 1863.
- The Convict, Or, the Conspirators' Victim: A Novel Written in Prison. New York: Dick & Fitzgerald, 1863.
- The Scourge of the Seas, Or, the Outlaw's Bride. New York: George Munro, 1864.
- Sadia: a Heroine of the Rebellion. New York: F.A. Brady, 1864.
- Netta Bride; Or, the King of the Vultures. New York, 1864.
- Mermet Ben, Or, the Astrologer King: A Story of Magic and Wonderful Illusions. New York: Hilton, 1865.
- Clara St. John, Or, the Mystery Solved: A Sequel to Mermet Ben. New York, 1865.
- The Parricides; or the Doom of the Assassins, the Authors of a Nation's Loss. A Tale Based on the Assassination of Abraham Lincoln. New York: Hilton & Co, 1865.
- The Battle of Hate, Or, Hearts Are Trumps. New York: F.A. Brady, 1865.
- Rose Seymour, Or, the Ballet Girl's Revenge: A Tale of the New-York Drama. New York: Hilton, 1865.
- Wealth and Beauty, Or, the Temptations of City Life., 1865.
- Netta Bride: And the Poor of New York. New York, 1865.
- The War-Eagle or the Scourge of the Mohawks. New York, 1865.
- The Rattlesnake: Or, the Rebel Privateer: A Tale of the Present Time. New York: Frederic A. Brady, 1865.
- The Beautiful Nun. Philadelphia: T.B. Peterson, 1866.
- Clarence Rhett: Or, the Cruise of a Privateer: an American Sea Story. New York: F.A. Brady, 1866.
- Magdalena, the Outcast; Or, the Millionaire's Daughter: A Story of Life in the Empire City. New York: Hilton, 1866.
- The Midnight Lamp, Or, Life in the Empire City. New York, 1866.
- Mark Myrtle, the Maniac Hunter. New York, 1866.
- Tiger-eye: A Story of Wild Adventure in the Backwoods. New York: G. Munro, 1866.
- Old Nick of the Swamp; Or, the Bravo's Vengeance: A Story of Texas. New York: George Munro & Co, 1867.
- Hawk-eye the Hunter: A Story of Western Life. New York: George Munro & Co, 1867.
- Rosa, the Indian Captive: A Story of the Last War with England. New York: Hilton, 1867.
- Templar's Chart Certificate of Membership. Greenpoint New York, 1867.
- (Buntline, Ned, Nathaniel, Orr.). Quaker Saul, The Idiot Spy, Or, Luliona, the Seminole: A Tale of Men and Deeds of '76., 1869.
- War-eagle; Or, Ossiniwa, the Indian Brave. New York: DeWitt Publisher, 1869.
- The Secret Vow; Or, the Power of Woman's Hate. New York: Beadle, 1870.
- Miriam, Or, the Jew's Daughter: A Tale of City Life. New York: Dick & Fitzgerald, 1870.
- Charley Bray; or the Fireman's Mission: The Story of a New York Fireman. New York: Trade publication, 1870.
- Luona's Oath, Or, the Curse Fulfilled. New York, 1870.
- Sib Cone, the Mountain Trapper. New York: Frank Starr, 1870.
- Mad Anthony's Captain. New York: George Munro, 1872.
- Texas Jack, The White King of the Pawnees, New York Weekly, Vol. XXVIII, No. 20, March 24, 1872
- Agnes, Or, the Beautiful Milliner. New York: Advance Pub, 1874.

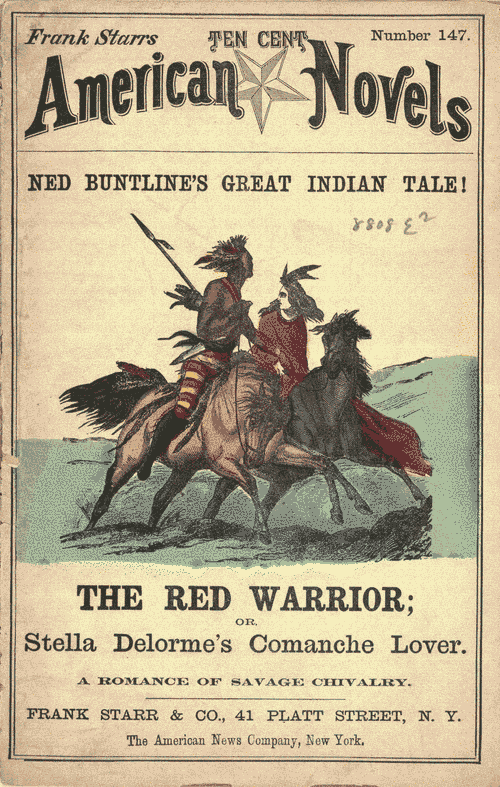

- The Red Warrior, Or, Stella Delorme's Comanche Lover: A Romance of Savage Chivalry. New York: Frank Starr, 1874.
- Red Ralph, the Ranger; or the Brother's Revenge. New York: F. Starr, 1875.
- The Smuggler: Or, the Skipper's Crime: A Tale of Ship and Shore. New York: Frank Starr, 1875.
- True As Steel, Or, the Faithful Sister. New York, 1876.
- Old Zip's Cabin: Or, a Greenhorn in the Woods. New York: Beadle and Adams, 1878.
- The Sea Bandit, Or, the Queen of the Isle: A Tale of the Antilles. New York: Frank Starr, 1879.
- Buffalo Bill, the King of Border Men. New York: publisher not identified, 1881.
- Andros, the Free Rover: Or, the Pirate's Daughter. New York: Beadle & Adams, 1883.
- Texas Jack's Chums or, the Whirlwinds of the West. New York: The Nickle Library (Series 24, No. 643), 1883.
- Old Sib Cone, the Mountain Trapper. New York: Beadle and Adams, 1885.
- Tombstone Dick, the Train Pilot, Or, the Traitor's Trail: A Story of the Arizonian Wilds. New York: Beadle & Adams, 1885.
- Buffalo Bill: His Life and Stirring Adventures in the Wild West. London: G. Purkess, 1887.
- Buffalo Bill's First Trail: Or, Will Cody, the Pony Express Rider. New York: M.J. Ivers, 1888.
- The Black Privateer, Or, Cruise of the Cloud-Rift. New York: Camp-fire Library Co, 1888.
- Shadowed and Trapped, Or, Harry the Sport. New York: Street & Smith, 1889.
- Alf, the Chicago Sport. New York: Street & Smith, 1889.
- The Miner Detective, Or, the Ghost of the Gulch. New York: Street & Smith, 1889.
- Fire Feather, the Buccaneer King: A Tale of the Caribbean Sea. New York, 1890.
- Orthodox Jeems: A Tale of Wild Adventure in the Black Hills. New York: Street & Smith, 1890.
- Red Douglass, Or, the King of the Black Forest. New York: Street & Smith, 1890.
- Hazel-eye, the Girl Trapper. New York: Street & Smith, 1890.
- The Sea Spy. New York: Beadle & Adams, 1890.
- Mountain Tom: A Story of the Diamond Fields. New York: Street & Smith, 1890.
- Gulietta the Waif, Or, the Girl Wrecker. New York: Street & Smith, 1890.
- Fritz's Old Score, Or, Sib Cone's Right Bower. New York, 1890.
- Rover Wild, the Jolly Reefer. New York: Street & Smith, 1890.
- Sensation Sate, the Queen of the Wild-Horse Range. New York: Street & Smith, 1890.
- The Pearl of the Reef, Or, the Diver's Daughter. New York: Street & Smith, 1890.
- The Witch of the Ocean, Or, the Lady of Silver Spray. New York: Street & Smith, 1891.

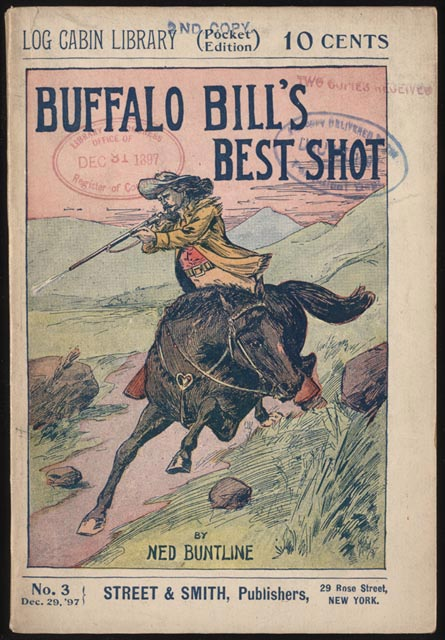

- Buffalo Bill's Last Victory, Or, Dove Eye, the Lodge Queen. New York: Street & Smith, 1891.
- 'Silver Wing', the Angel of the Tribes. New York: Street & Smith, 1891.
- Red Dick, the Tiger of California. New York: Street & Smith, 1891.
- The Revenue Officer's Triumph; Or, the Sunken Treasure. New York: Street & Smith, 1891.
- Long Tom, the Privateer. New York: Beadle & Adams, 1891.
- Big Foot Wallace, the Giant Hero of the Border. New York: Street & Smith, 1891.
- Buckskin Sam the Scalp-Taker. New York: Street & Smith, 1891.
- Sam Ricketty, Or, a Well Planned Plot. New York, 1891.
- Midwhipman [sic] Angus of H.m.s. Plantagenet, Or, the West Indian Sea Mystery. New York: Street & Smith, 1891.
- Merciless Ben, the Hair-Lifter. New York: Street & Smith, 1891.
- Bill Tredegar, the Moonshiner of Blue Ridge. New York: Street & Smith, 1895.
- Dashing Charlie, the Texan Whirlwind. New York: Street & Smith, 1896.
- Wild Bill's Last Trail. New York: Street and Smith, 1896.
- Darrow, the Floating Detective, Or, the Shadowed Buccaneer: A Thrilling Ocean Story. New York: Street & Smith, 1896.
- Wrestling Joe, the Dandy of the Mines, Or, the Crimson Trail of the Avenger. New York: Street & Smith, 1896.
- Barnacle Backstay, Or, the Gray Eagle of the Atlantic. New York: Street & Smith, 1896.
- Captain Jack, Or, the Seven Scouts. New York: Street & Smith, 1896.
- Bill Tredegar, Or, the Outlaw of the Blue Ridge: A Story of the Secret Service. New York: Street & Smith, 1896.
- Buffalo Bill's Best Shot. New York: Street & Smith, 1897.
- The Ice-King, Or, Fate of the Lost Steamer: A Story of the Frozen North. New York, 1898.

== Music lyrics ==
- Buntline, Ned and Woodbury, Isaac B. Capture of Monterey. Boston: Prentiss & Clark, 1847.
- Buntline, Ned and Woodbury, Isaac B. The Waving Plume: Song. Boston: E.H. Wade, 1847.
- Buntline, Ned, J H. Johnson, and M G. Lewis. The Toper's Appeal: A Parody on the Maniac. Philadelphia, Pa.: J.H. Johnson, Song publisher, 1855.
- Buntline, Ned and J H. Johnson. Sad Times: The Burning of the Steamboat New Jersey, on the Delaware, Night of March 15, 1856. Sixty-Two Persons Hurried into Eternity by Water and by Fire. Philadelphia: Johnson's, No. 5 North Tenth Street, Philad, 1856.
- The Philadelphia Girl's Lament!. Philadelphia: J.H. Johnson, Song publisher, 1856.
- Buntline, Ned, and J R. Thomas. The Rainbow Temperance Song. New York: William A. Pond, 1868.

== Plays ==
- The Scouts of the Prairie. Performed by the Buffalo Bill Combination, Chicago, Dec. 15 1872
