= Old Fauquier County Jail =

Historic building in Virginia, US

- Fauquier History Museum at the Old Jail
- U.S. National Register of Historic Places
- Virginia Landmarks Register
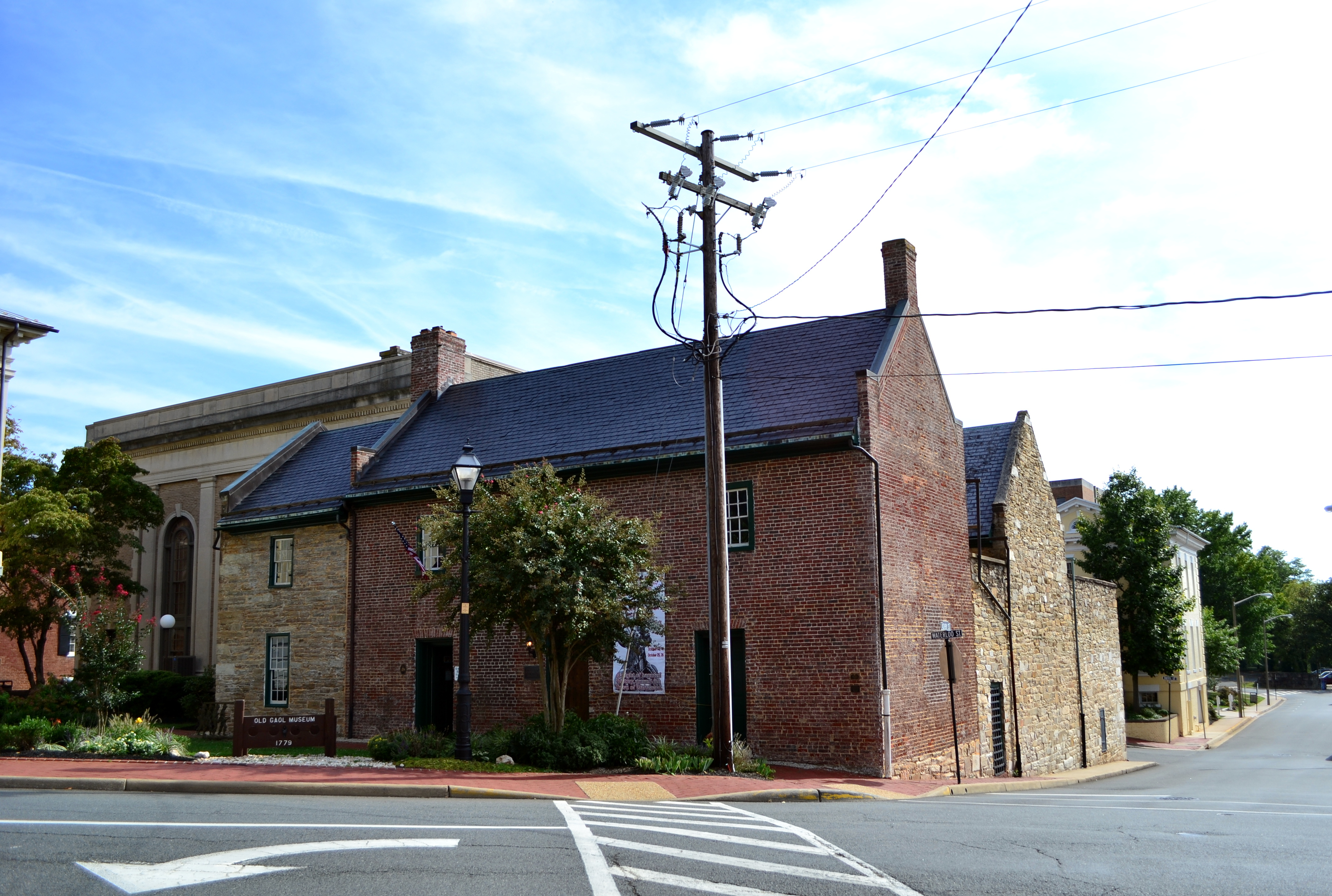
- Fauquier History Museum at the Old Jail, Warrenton, Va.

- Location within Northern Virginia Location within Virginia Location within the United States
- Location: Fauquier County Courthouse Sq., Warrenton, Virginia
- Coordinates: 38°42′49″N 77°47′46″W
- Area: less than one acre
- Built: 1808, 1824
- NRHP reference No.: 78003015
- VLR No.: 156-0004

Significant dates
- Added to NRHP: January 20, 1978
- Designated VLR: February 15, 1977

Built in Warrenton in 1808, the sixth jail in Fauquier County, Virginia ran for only fifteen years before a new jail was erected behind it after a lawsuit with the Commonwealth of Virginia. In those fifteen years the four-cell jail saw death and disease from neglectful conditions. Soon after the 1823 jail was constructed, the 1808 jail was transformed into a jailer's house, so that he and his family could move in and care for the prisoners. A two-story sandstone addition was added onto the original brick structure to serve as a kitchen and second floor bedroom. It was operated as a jail until 1966, when the Fauquier Historical Society saved it from demolition and created a museum.

The museum was known as The Old Jail Museum before it was rebranded as the Fauquier History Museum at the Old Jail in 2014. It was listed on the National Register of Historic Places in 1978.

The first execution of criminals condemned to suffer capital punishment in Virginia since the passage of the law, by the last General Assembly, requiring the sentence to be executed in private, occurred at the jail on July 11, 1879.
