= Brentmoor =

Historic house in Virginia, United States

- U.S. National Register of Historic Places
- Virginia Landmarks Register
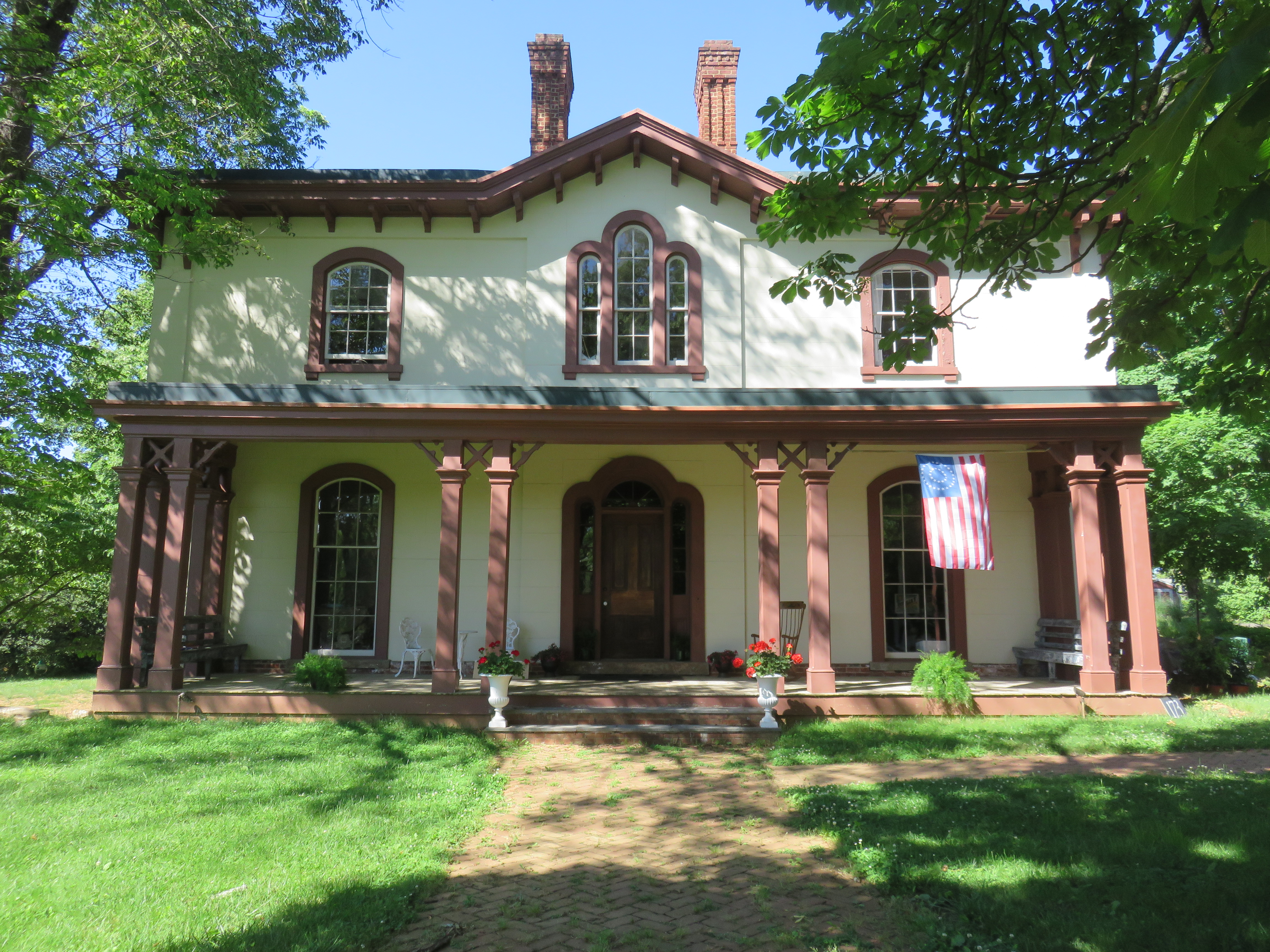
- Brentmoor/Mosby House

- Location within Northern Virginia Location within Virginia Location within the United States
- Location: 173 Main St., Warrenton, Virginia
- Coordinates: 38°42′41″N 77°47′27″W
- Area: |3.4 acres
- Built: 1859
- Architectural style: Italian Villa
- NRHP reference No.: 78003016
- VLR No.: 156-0014

Significant dates
- Added to NRHP: January 20, 1978
- Designated VLR: February 15, 1977

Brentmoor, also known as the Spilman-Mosby House in Warrenton, Virginia, is a historic site that was the home of Confederate military leader John Singleton Mosby.

== History ==
The house was built in 1859 as the residence of Judge Edward M. Spilman and his family, who later sold the house to James Keith, who went on to become the president of the Virginia Court of Appeals. Mosby purchased the property from the Keiths in 1875. In 1877, the property was sold to Congressman Eppa Hunton, who lived there with his wife and son, Eppa Jr. for most of the following 25 years. Brentmoor was added to the National Register of Historic Places in 1978. The house briefly served as the location for the John Singleton Mosby Museum and Education Center, founded by Patricia B. Fitch in 2001. In 2018, the town sold the property back into private ownership. As of 2019, it is under renovations to become a family home.

== Architecture ==
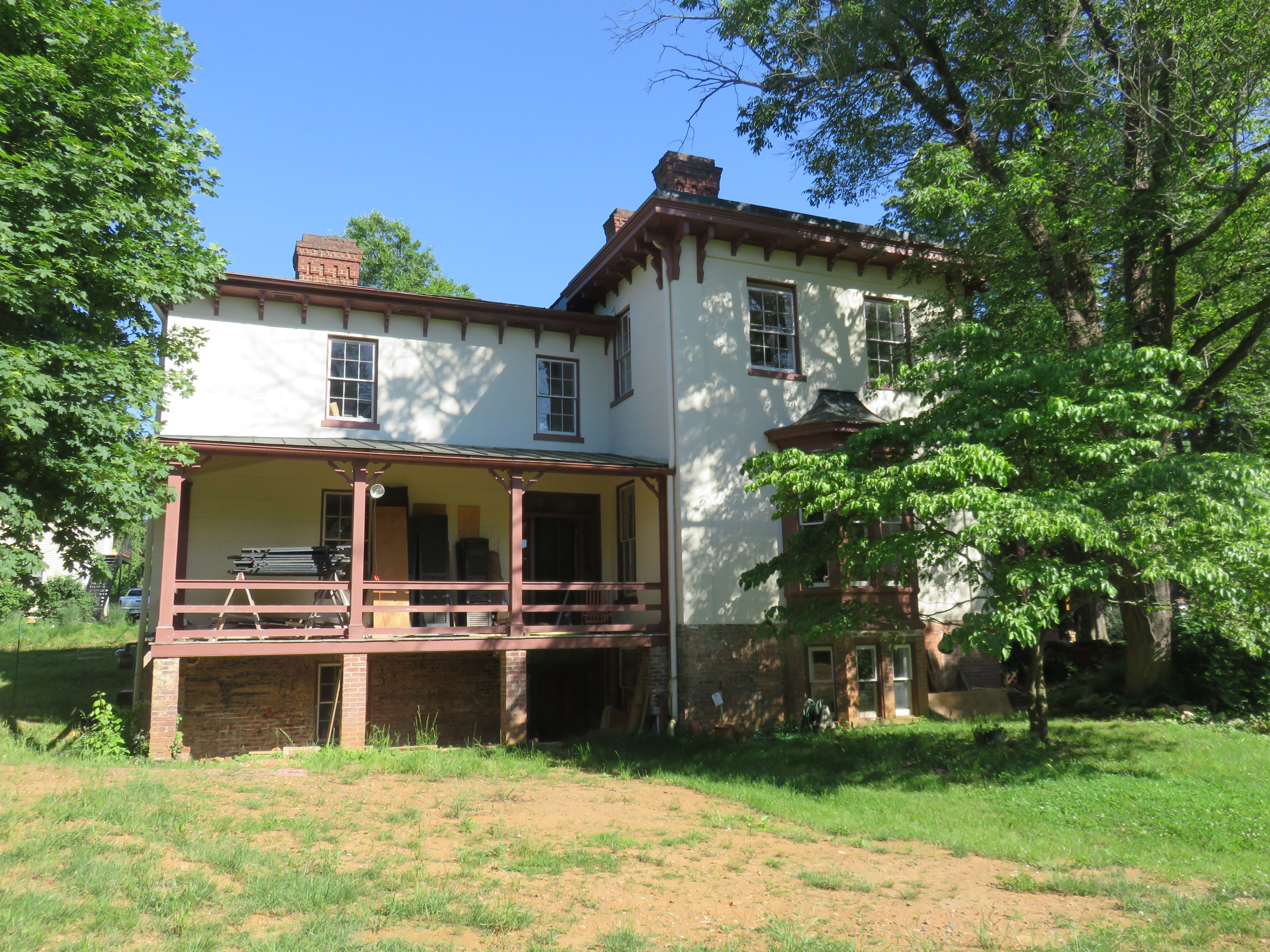
Side of the house

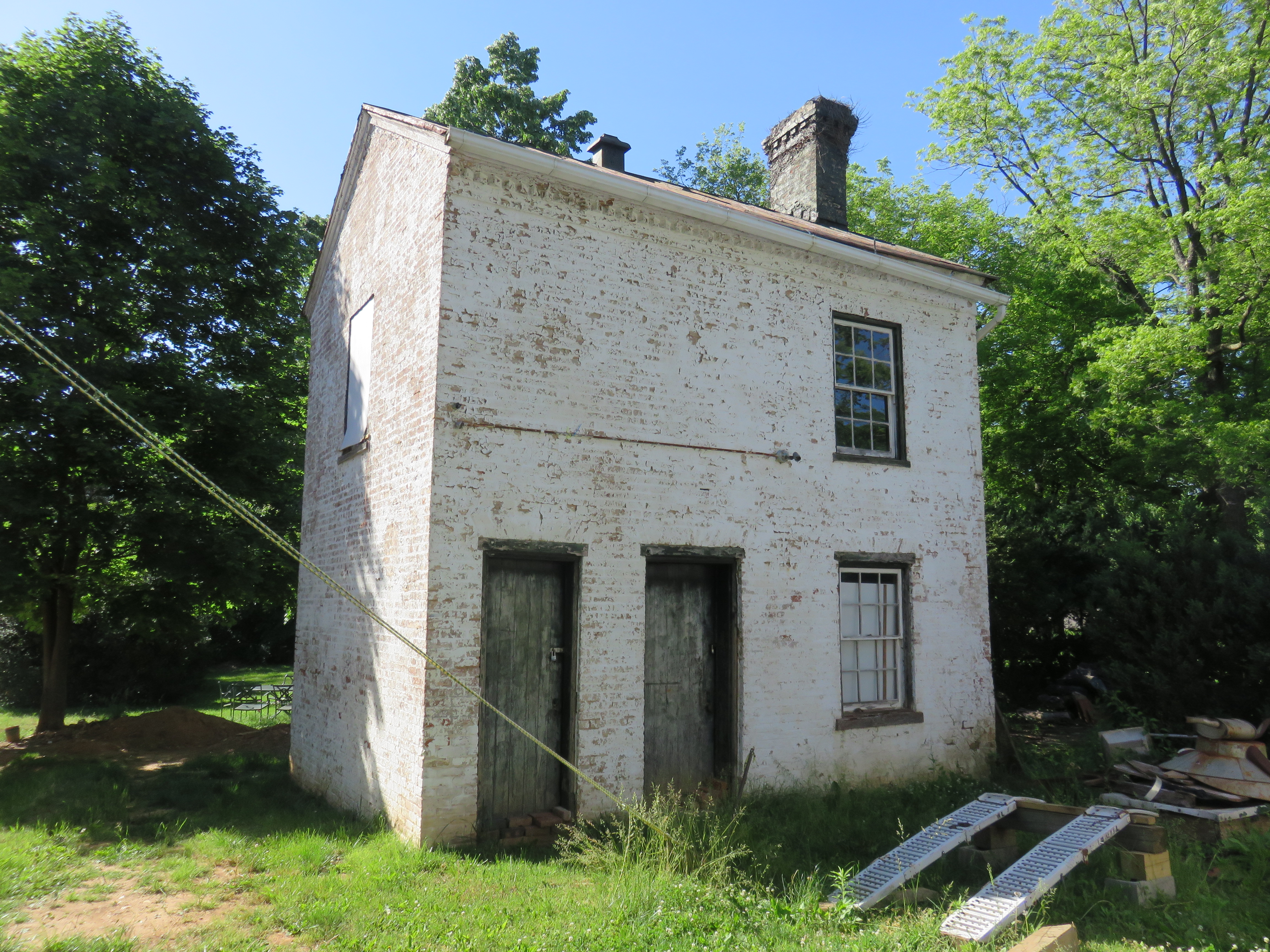
Summer kitchen

Brentmoor is a two-story Italianate style house, three bays wide. The west side of the house has an "English basement"-with earth to just below window sill height. The central bay is given emphasis by a 2 inch deep projection below a cross gable. This center bay frames the entry door with sidelights, and the second floor has a tri-part window on center, each window part is round-headed. The 2 inch projection is repeated at, and around the corners giving a suggestion of pilasters. A single story porch extends across the front supported by coupled, bracketed columns. The center-hall (N-S) plan features a single room to either side of the hall with 12 foot ceilings; each room has a fireplace backing against the center hall.

Beyond the center hall, through an arched opening, there is a cross-hall (E-W) with the single stairway rising from west to east. Each end of the cross-hall has a door with sidelights. The east end is a grade level entry with small roof; the west end door leads to a porch, 6.5 feet above grade. Below this porch earth is retained -mirroring porch outlines- allowing a basement door with sidelights. This west basement door leads to a depressed terrace with stairs up to the lawn.

North of the cross-hall are two more rooms with back to back fireplaces. These rooms and cross-hall have 10' ceilings. North of the east rear room, there was once a kitchen wing (removed c. 2001) which allowed easy communication with the nearby summer kitchen. All walls-including interior divisions are solid brick masonry. The second floor of the house is a near duplication of the first floor. Brentmoor was one of the earliest houses in Warrenton to incorporate indoor plumbing.

The only outbuildings remaining include a brick two-story-with attic summer-kitchen (16' x 20') and a brick smokehouse (13'x 13') which surround a brick paved courtyard space between the two; all is to the north of the house.
