= Warrenton, Virginia =

- Town
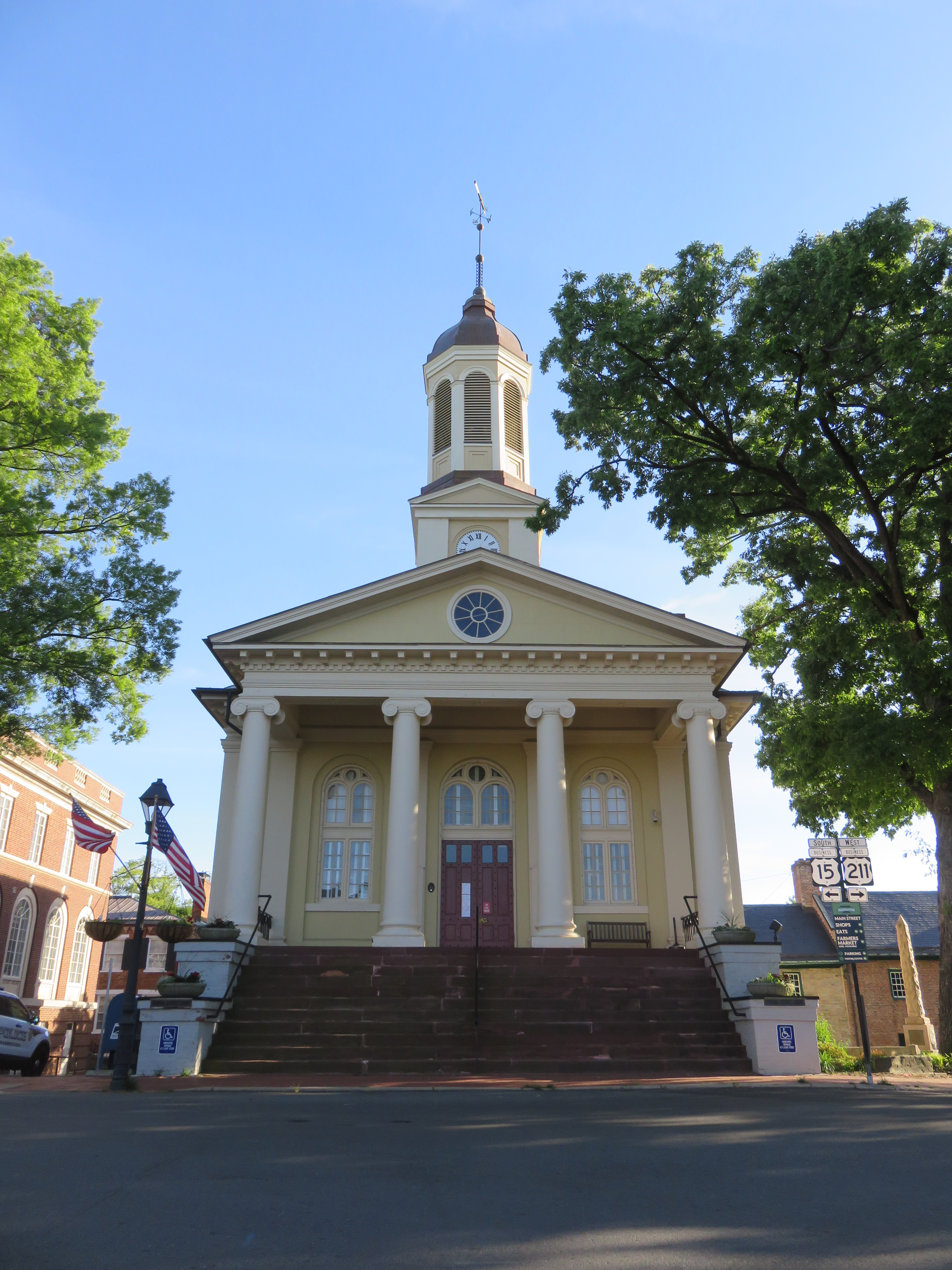
- Courthouse Square

- Seal

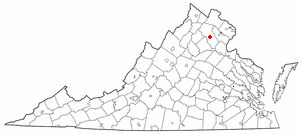
- Location in Virginia
- Coordinates: 38°43′6″N 77°47′50″W
- Country: United States
- State: Virginia
- County: Fauquier
- Founded: 1810
- Named for: Joseph Warren

Government
  - Type: Council-Manager
  - Mayor: Carter Nevill
  - Interim Town Manager: Christopher Martino

Area
  - Total: 4.38 sq mi (11.34 km^{2})
  - Land: 4.37 sq mi (11.33 km^{2})
  - Water: 0.0039 sq mi (0.01 km^{2})
- Elevation: 643 ft (196 m)

Population (2020)
  - Total: 10,057
  - Estimate (2024): 10,224
  - Density: 2,292.2/sq mi (885.01/km^{2})
- Time zone: UTC−5 (Eastern (EST))
  - Summer (DST): UTC−4 (EDT)
- ZIP Codes: 20186–20188
- Area codes: 540, 703, 571
- FIPS code: 51-83136
- GNIS feature ID: 1500278
- Website: www.warrentonva.gov

Warrenton is a town in Fauquier County, Virginia, United States. It is the county seat. The population was 10,057 as of the 2020 census, an increase from 9,611 at the 2010 census and 6,670 at the 2000 census. The estimated population in July 2021 was 10,109. It is at the junction of U.S. Route 15, U.S. Route 17, U.S. Route 29, and U.S. Route 211. The town is in the Piedmont region of Virginia just east of the Blue Ridge Mountains. The well-known Airlie Conference Center is 3 miles (5 km) north of Warrenton, and the historic Vint Hill Farms military facility is 9 miles (14 km) east. Fauquier Hospital is located in the town. Surrounded by Virginia wine and horse country, Warrenton is a popular destination outside Washington, D.C.

Warrenton shares some services with the county, such as schools and the county landfill. The area was home to Bethel Military Academy.

== History ==
=== 18th century and founding ===
The settlement which would grow into the town of Warrenton began as a crossroads at the junction of the Falmouth-Winchester and Alexandria-Culpeper roads, where a trading post called the Red Store was located. In the 1790s, a courthouse was built in the area, and the location was known as "Fauquier Courthouse".

=== 19th century and the American Civil War ===
The Town of Warrenton was incorporated on January 5, 1810, and named for General Joseph Warren, a Revolutionary War hero. Richard Henry Lee donated the land for the county seat. John S. Horner, Secretary of Wisconsin Territory and Acting Governor of Michigan Territory, was born in Warrenton. John Marshall, the fourth Chief Justice of the U.S. Supreme Court, was from Germantown, modern-day Midland, 10 miles (16 km) south of Warrenton.

Warrenton was connected to the Orange and Alexandria Railroad in 1853 via a branch line. Warrenton's connection to the line had previously been proposed, but construction hasn't begun until 1852. Given the rail line's strategic usage during the American Civil War, the Warrenton Branch was a target for attack twice. Because of this, the railroad was left largely abandoned and unusable by 1863. Southern Railway resumed passenger service to the town from 1909 to 1944 with commercial service continuing through the 1980s. Norfolk Southern ended service entirely in 1989 with the removal of tracks.

August 1862 stereograph of the railroad depot in the Town of Warrenton taken by Timothy H. O'Sullivan.

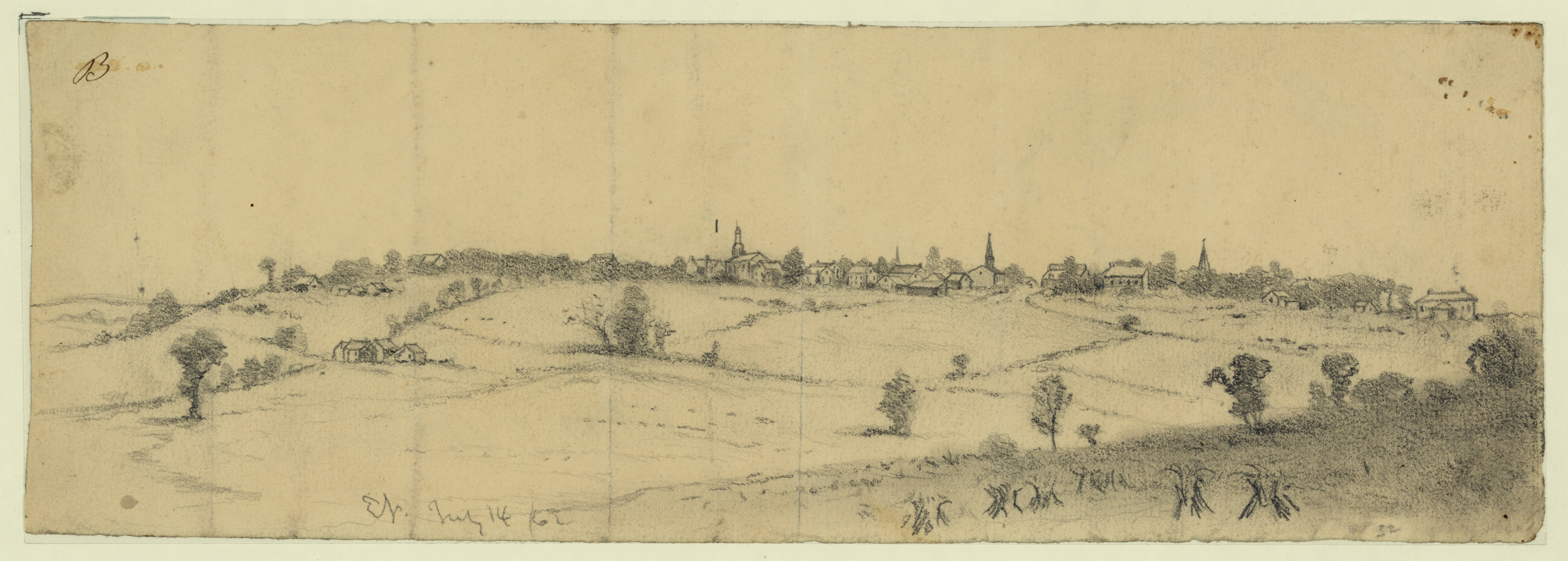
July 14, 1862, Illustration of the Town of Warrenton by Edwin Forbes.

Confederate Colonel John S. Mosby made raids in the town during the American Civil War and later made his home and practiced law in Warrenton. The Warren Green Hotel building hosted many famous people, including the Marquis de Lafayette, James Monroe, Andrew Jackson, Henry Clay, President Theodore Roosevelt, and divorcée Wallis Simpson. Union General George B. McClellan bade farewell to his officers November 11, 1862, from the steps of the hotel. It now hosts some offices of the Fauquier County government. In March 2026 the Town of Warrenton received an offer from hotel developers Kevin and Remington Ash to purchase the building to renovate and re-open as a hotel and club.

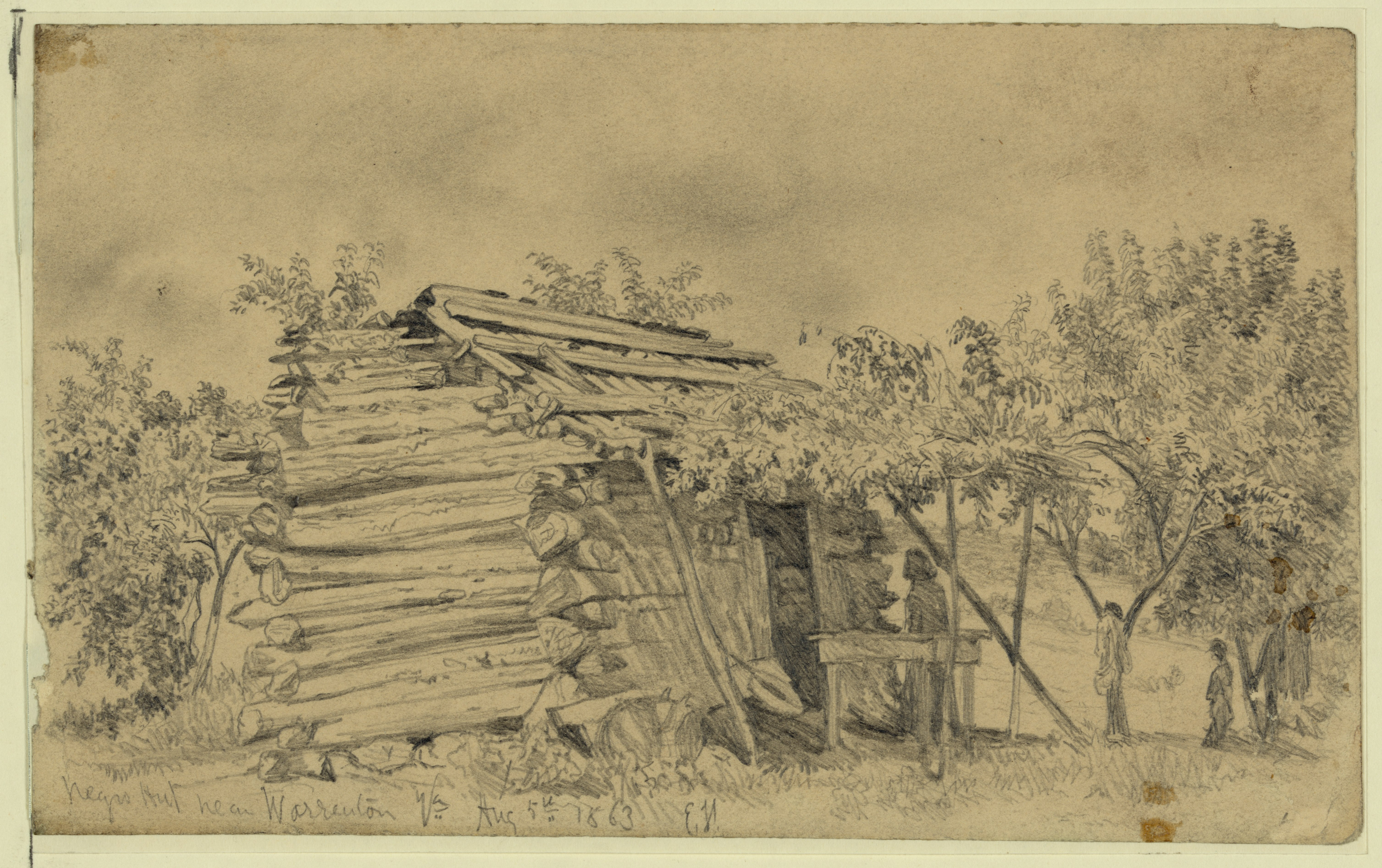
August 5, 1863, Illustration of a slave cabin near the Town of Warrenton by Edwin Forbes.

Arthur Jordan, a black American man, was lynched by a mob of approximately 60–75 men in white hoods in the early hours of January 19, 1880. Jordan had been accused of miscegenation and bigamy for eloping with Elvira (Lucille) Corder, the daughter of his white employer, Nathan Corder, a landowner and farmer in the upper part of the county along the Rappahannock River. A group of local men hunted the pair down near Williamsport, Maryland, captured Mr. Jordan and returned him to Fauquier, whereupon he was delivered to the town jail. Later that night, the masked lynch mob gained access to the jail and dragged Jordan to the nearby town cemetery, where he was hanged from a small locust tree. Ms. Corder remained in Maryland, estranged from her family, until her death a few years later. News of the lynching was reported in papers across the nation. Even some foreign newspapers, such as Australia's Sydney Morning Herald, reprinted accounts of the event.

=== 20th century ===
In 1909, a fire destroyed almost half the structures in the town and was halted with the use of dynamite to create a firebreak to stop the flames from spreading.

In 1939, Washington Times-Herald journalist Count Igor Cassini wrote a column piece that upset several members of Virginia high society. While covering a horse show in Warrenton, Cassini was kidnapped and tarred and feathered by three disgruntled individuals related to one mentioned in his column piece. Cassini was treated for burns at the Fauquier County Hospital in the early morning, with the three individuals being arrested and placed on probation.

In 1951, the federal government established the Warrenton Training Center just outside Warrenton. The center is a secret Central Intelligence Agency communications facility, which also houses an underground relocation bunker containing communications infrastructure to support continuity of government in the event of a nuclear attack on Washington, DC.

A bypass route around the town was built in the early 1960s, which attracted restaurants, gas stations, and shopping centers, but also drew businesses away from the center of town.

The Warrenton Historic District was listed on the National Register of Historic Places in 1983. Other listings in or near Warrenton include Brentmoor, Dakota, Hopefield, Loretta, Monterosa, North Wales, The Oaks, the Old Fauquier County Jail, and Yorkshire House.

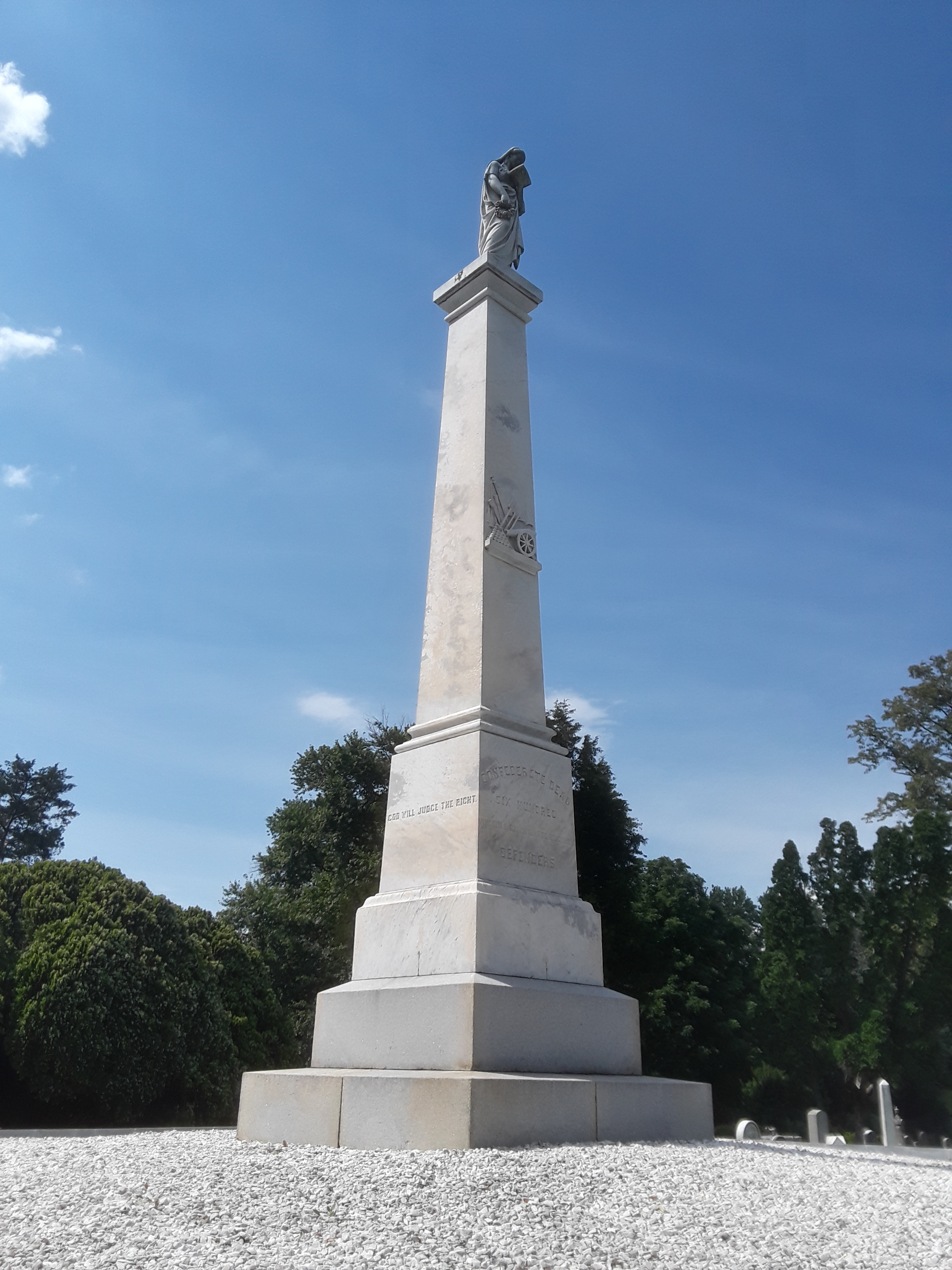
1887 Confederate Dead Monument obelisk with the 1998 addition in the Warrenton Cemetery

In 1998, Warrenton's "Black Horse" chapter of the United Daughters of the Confederacy erected and dedicated a monument in the Warrenton Cemetery to 520 Confederate soldiers buried there, many of whom died during the First and Second Battles of Bull Run. This new monument altered a pre-existing Confederate obelisk built in 1877 by building a granite wall around the obelisk engraved with those 520 names. The then-mayor's wife spearheaded fundraising for the monument from private organizations and the United Daughters of the Confederacy itself, of which she was a member. This monument still remains.

== Geography ==
Warrenton is located in central Fauquier County at 38°43′06″N 77°47′50″W (38.718307, −77.797085). U.S. Route 29 leads northeast 12 miles (19 km) to Gainesville and 47 miles (76 km) to Washington, D.C., and southwest 25 miles (40 km) to Culpeper. U.S. Route 15 follows US 29 out of town in both directions but leads north-northeast 34 miles (55 km) to Leesburg. U.S. Route 17 leads northwest 42 miles (68 km) to Winchester and southeast 44 miles (71 km) to Fredericksburg, and U.S. Route 211 leads west 34 miles (55 km) to Skyline Drive in Shenandoah National Park.

According to the U.S. Census Bureau, Warrenton has a total area of 4.5 square miles (11.7 km^{2}), of which 0.004 square miles (0.01 km^{2}), or 0.13%, is water. The eastern, southern, and northern parts of the town drain east to Cedar Run, a tributary of the Occoquan River and part of the Potomac River watershed, while the western part of town drains south via Great Run to the Rappahannock River.

== Education ==
=== Primary and secondary schools ===
Fauquier County Public Schools serves Warrenton. The elementary schools within the town serve Kindergarten to Fifth grades and consist of James G. Brumfield Elementary, Carson M. Bradley Elementary, and Peter. B. Smith Elementary.

The only public middle school that serves Warrenton is Taylor Middle School. Taylor Middle School serves grades six through eight. Warrenton Middle School was closed following the 2022–2023 school year and temporarily merged with Taylor Middle School during the construction of a new middle school also to be named Taylor Middle School.

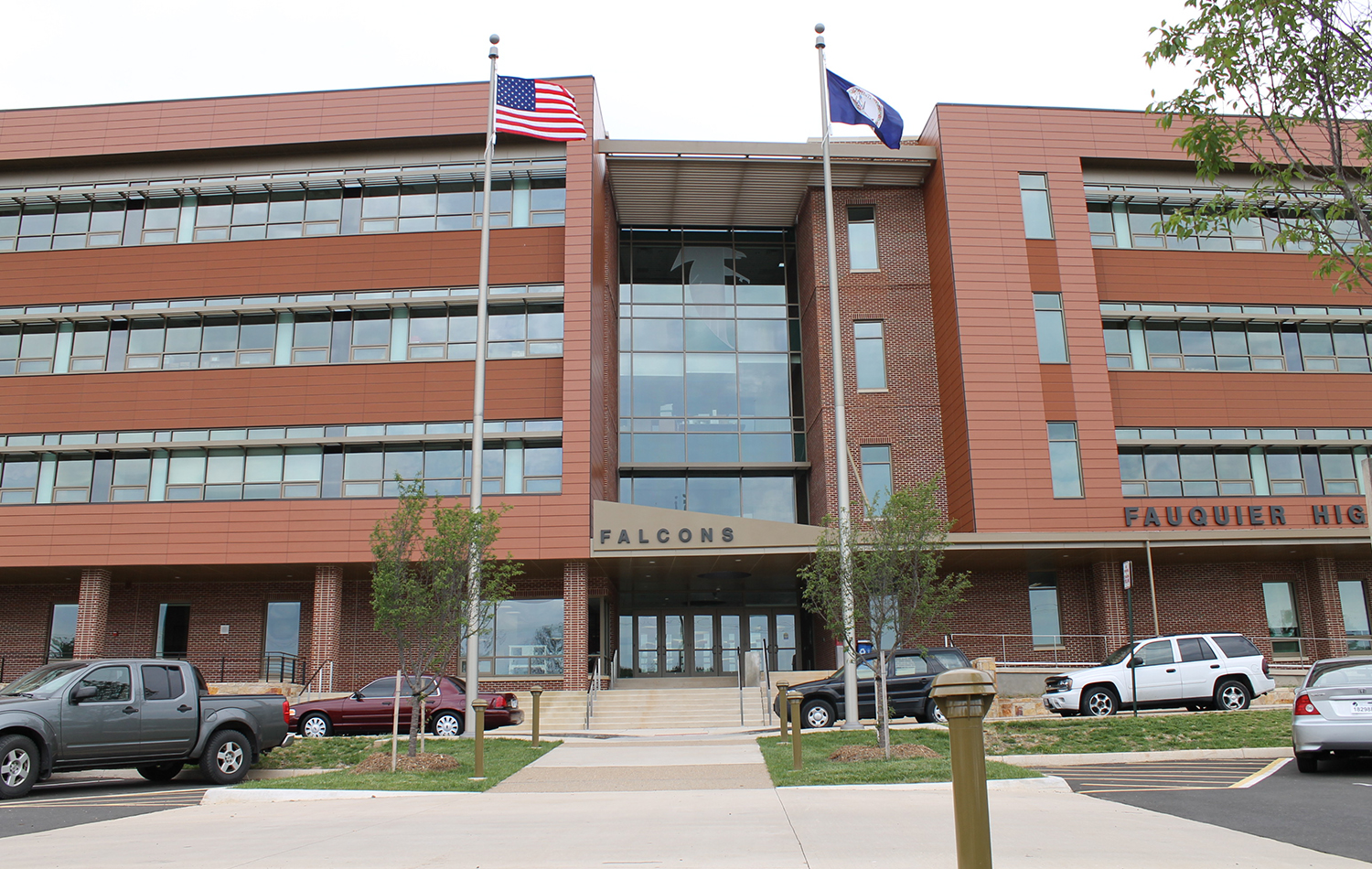
The front façade of Fauquier High School.

The high school that serves Warrenton is Fauquier High School, which educates grades Nine through 12. The Fauquier County Public School system also operates an extremely small alternative learning school at Southeastern Alternative School. This school serves both middle and high school students throughout the county, including Warrenton.

There are three private schools in the town of Warrenton: Highland School, St. John The Evangelist's Catholic School, and St. James' Episcopal School.

=== Colleges and universities ===
The Fauquier campus of Laurel Ridge Community College resides just south of the town limits.

In 2022, Hazel Hall, a science, engineering and health professions building, was opened and construction begun on a Center for Skilled Trades.

=== Public libraries ===
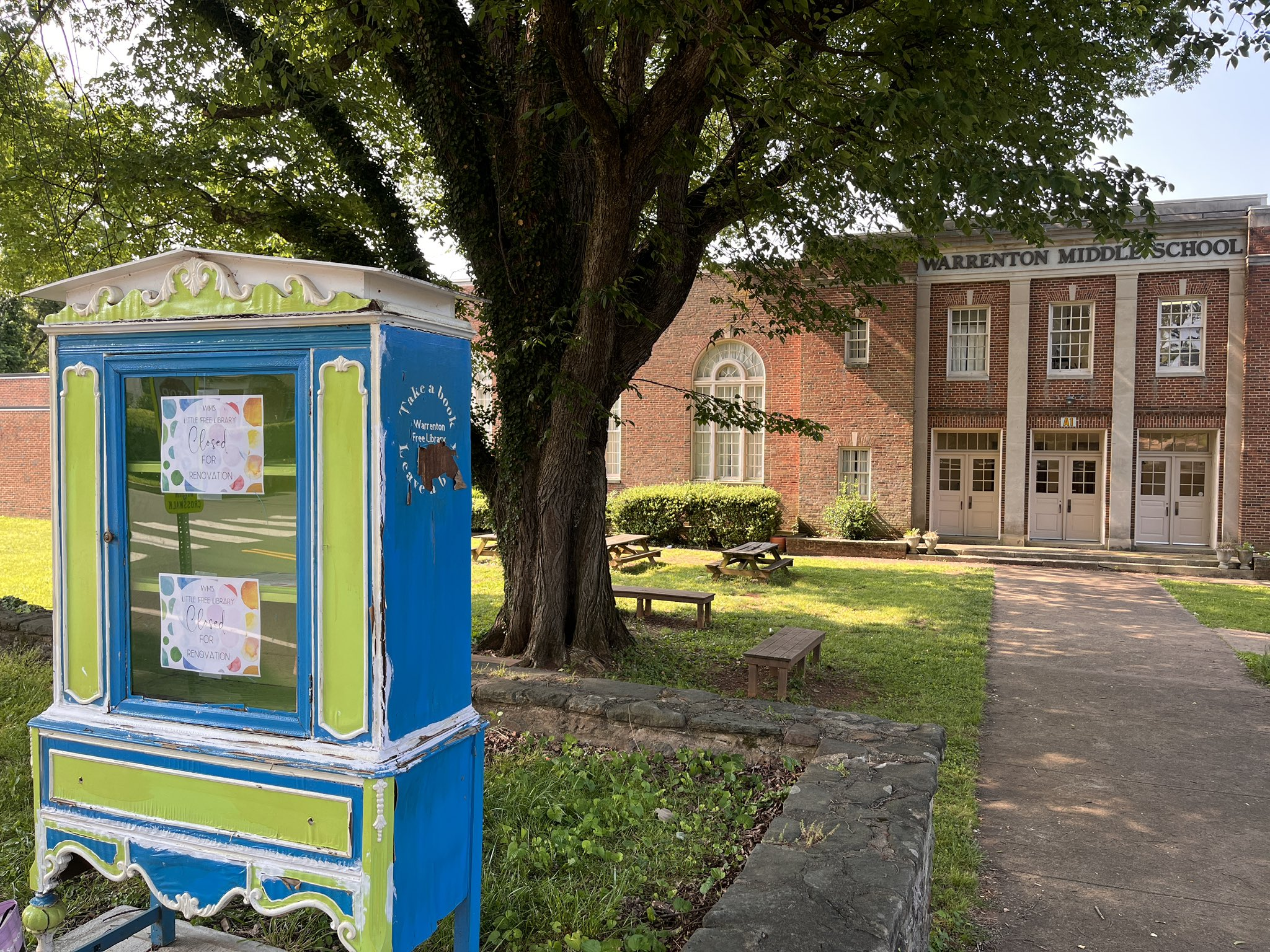
Warrenton Middle School with a public bookshelf sponsored by the school's library.

The Fauquier Public Library's Warrenton Library is located within the Warrenton Historic District. Despite being located within the town, the library is actually run by the county government's Library Board. Each public school also has an internal library that students can access. Additionally, public bookcases and Little Free Library locations can be found throughout the Town.

== Arts and culture ==
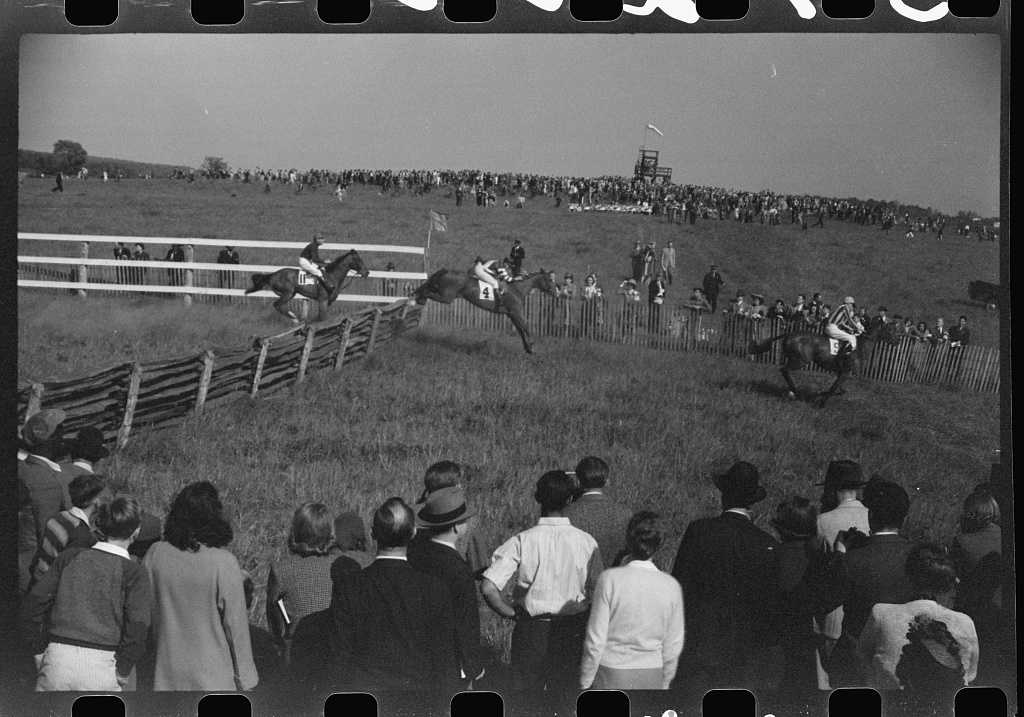
May 1941 Photograph of the Gold Cup Race by Marion Post Wolcott.

Steeplechases have had a large impact on the culture within Fauquier County as well as the Town of Warrenton. This is largely due to the 1922 organization of the first Virginia Gold Cup race within the town. This event, along with the Maryland Hunt Cup, were two of the most prominent horse races at the time and remained prominent throughout the 20th century. Following the 1984 race, the event was moved to the nearby city, The Plains, where it has remained. The Virginia Gold Cup and International Gold Cup Race have drawn upwards of 50,000 attendees per year, assuring its cultural impact in the surrounding communities.

On the first Friday of each month between May and October, the Town of Warrenton hosts a themed street fair called "First Friday" within the Warrenton Historic District. Each month is typically themed to a different topic, affecting what local vendors and activities are available during the event.

The Town of Warrenton owns and operates four public parks and one recreation center. In spring 2026, Town residents organized to protect the skate park located at the WARF recreation center and the town council approved an $850,000 budgetary line item for park upgrades.

Warrenton has several pieces of public art adorning the town. In 2001, watercolor painter Stewart Burgess White painted three murals on a single building depicting scenes from the American Civil War. Additionally, these murals included several hidden details such as faces of 19th century American leaders, references to the September 11 attacks, and the name of the painter's daughter. Artists Ross Trimmer and Michael Broth collaborated on a mural that emulates classic large-letter postcards. In 2021, a group of local National Honor Society students from Kettle Run High School painted a small mural on a neglected wall lining a parking lot.

== Transportation ==
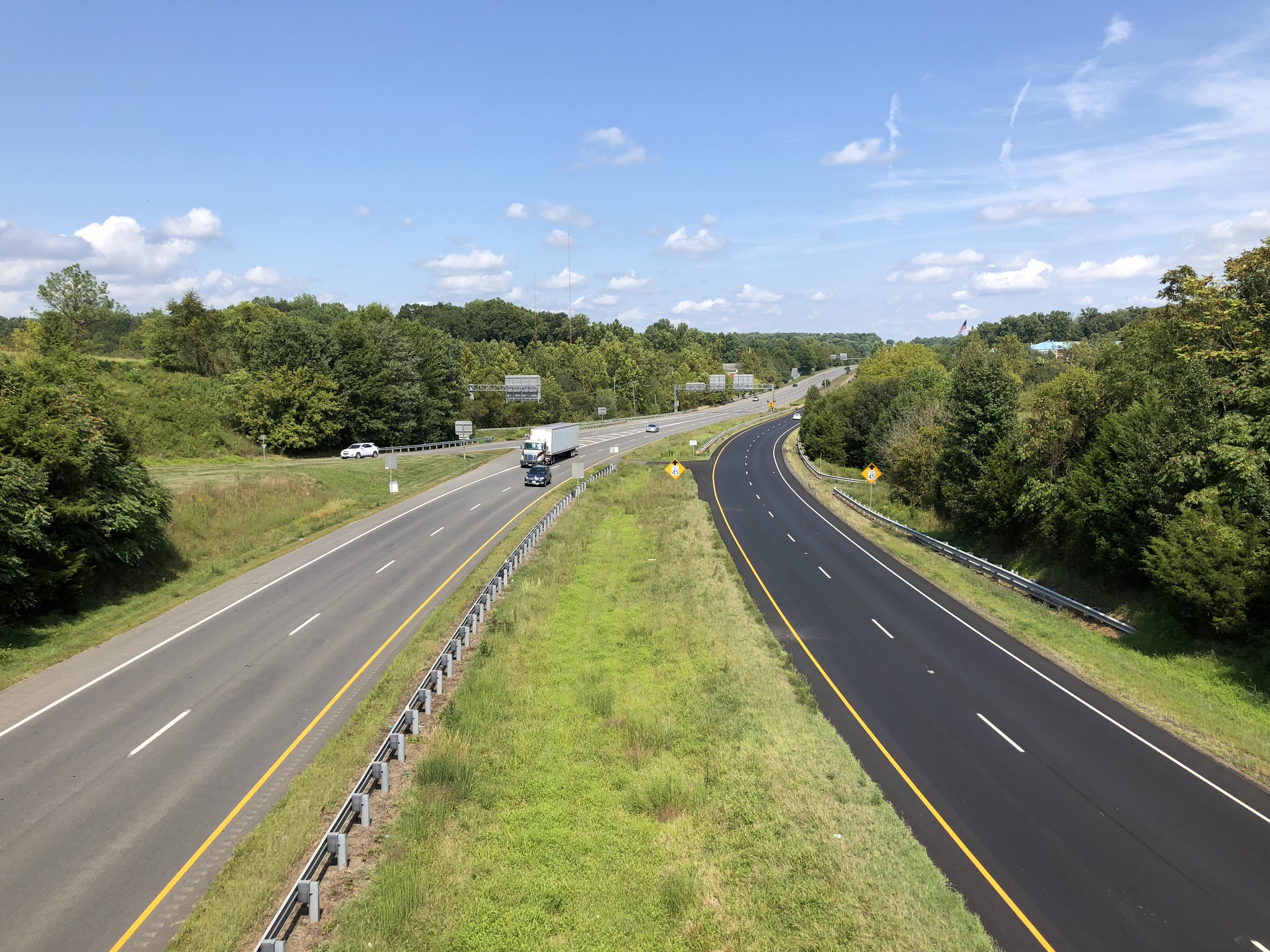
US 15/US 29 northbound in Warrenton

Warrenton is served by four U.S. Routes; U.S. Route 15, U.S. Route 17, U.S. Route 29 (which collectively form the Eastern Bypass) and U.S. Route 211. US 15 extends north and south, heading towards Leesburg in the north and Orange to the south. US 17 is oriented northwest to southeast, connecting to Winchester to the northwest and Fredericksburg to the southeast. US 29 is oriented northeast to southwest, reaching Washington, D.C. to the northeast and Charlottesville to the southwest. Finally, US 211 begins north of the downtown area and extends westward, passing through Luray and the Shenandoah Valley. All four highways originally passed directly through the center of town and now follow bypasses. However, downtown Warrenton is now served by U.S Route 15 Business, U.S Route 17 Business, U.S Route 29 Business and U.S Route 211 Business.

Virginia Regional Transit operates the Circuit Rider bus in Warrenton. Academy Bus operates a commuter bus from Warrenton to Washington, D.C. The Virginia Department of Rail and Public Transportation and Megabus operate a weekday commuter bus service called the Piedmont Express from Danville, V.A. to Washington, D.C. with a stop in Warrenton.

== Associated people ==
- James DeRuyter Blackwell, Civil War-era poet and writer
- Steve Brodie, Major League Baseball player
- Edward Brooke, U.S. senator
- Anthony Cave Brown, journalist and historian
- Jesse Brown, former U.S. Secretary of Veterans Affairs
- Matt Carson, entrepreneur and author
- Samuel Chilton, 19th-century politician and lawyer
- Walter Chrysler, founder of the Chrysler Corporation
- Walter P. Chrysler Jr., art collector, museum benefactor, and Thoroughbred horse breeder
- Julia Ringwood Coston, 19th-century Afro-American publisher and magazine editor who founded the first magazine ever published for black women
- Brenton Doyle, Major League Baseball player
- Mike Duvall, Major League Baseball player
- George B. Fitch, former mayor of Warrenton and co-founder of the Jamaican bobsled team
- Ella Fitzgerald, drag queen
- Benita Fitzgerald-Brown, Olympic athlete
- Grenville Gaines, mayor of Warrenton
- Craig Gilmore, winner, 2013 ESPN Tournament Challenge
- John S. Horner, acting governor of Michigan Territory
- Eppa Hunton, U.S. congressman and senator, brigadier general in the Confederate Army
- John C. Mackie, U.S. congressman
- Malcolm MacPherson, Newsweek correspondent and author
- Frances Harrison Marr (1835–1918), poet
- Charles Marshall, Confederate States Army colonel
- James K. Marshall, Confederate States Army colonel
- John Augustine Marshall, U.S. federal judge
- Thomas Love Moore, U.S. congressman and lawyer
- William Moore, blues musician
- John S. Mosby, Confederate cavalry battalion commander
- Inman E. Page, minister and educator
- William H. F. Payne, Confederate States Army general
- Dorothy B. Porter, bibliographer and curator, built the Moorland-Spingarn Research Center at Howard University
- Scott Shipp, superintendent of the Virginia Military Institute
- William "Extra Billy" Smith, congressman, twice governor of Virginia, and Confederate general
- Gwyn R. Tompkins, Thoroughbred horse racing trainer
- Septimus Tustin, clergyman
- Erica Wallach, American-German political activist and teacher
- Sarah White, singer-songwriter
- Charles S. Whitehouse, career Foreign Service officer, U.S. Ambassador to Laos and Thailand
- Bonnie Zacherle, toy designer and illustrator, creator of the My Little Pony toy line

== Climate ==
The climate in this area is characterized by hot, humid summers and generally mild to cool winters. According to the Köppen Climate Classification system, Warrenton has a humid subtropical climate, abbreviated "Cfa" on climate maps.

== Demographics ==
Historical population
Census	Pop.	Note	%±
1860	604		—
1870	1,256		107.9%
1880	1,464		16.6%
1890	1,346		−8.1%
1900	1,627		20.9%
1910	1,427		−12.3%
1920	1,545		8.3%
1930	1,450		−6.1%
1940	1,651		13.9%
1950	1,797		8.8%
1960	3,522		96.0%
1970	4,027		14.3%
1980	3,907		−3.0%
1990	4,830		23.6%
2000	6,670		38.1%
2010	9,611		44.1%
2020	10,057		4.6%
2024 (est.)	10,224	▲	1.7%
U.S. Decennial Census

=== 2020 census ===
As of the 2020 census, Warrenton had a population of 10,057. The median age was 41.2 years. 8.0% of residents were under five years of age, 22.1% were under the age of 18, and 18.7% were 65 years of age or older. For every 100 females there were 87.0 males, and for every 100 females age 18 and over there were 83.4 males age 18 and over. Population density was 2,296.1 people per square mile (885.01/km^{2}).

100.0% of residents lived in urban areas, while 0.0% lived in rural areas. The population pyramid shows the percentage of individuals of each sex within each age group, with a rectangular shape.

There were 3,990 households in Warrenton, including 2,159 family households. Of all households, 30.9% had children under the age of 18 living in them, 42.6% were married-couple households, 16.1% had a male householder and no spouse or partner present, and 35.3% had a female householder and no spouse or partner present. About 33.0% of all households were made up of individuals, and 16.7% had someone living alone who was 65 years of age or older. The average household size was 2.43 residents per household.

There were 4,198 housing units, of which 5.0% were vacant. The homeowner vacancy rate was 1.5% and the rental vacancy rate was 3.3%. 63.1% of households owned their housing units while 36.9% rented.

Racial composition as of the 2020 census
Race	Number	Percent
White	7,261	72.2%
Black or African American	1,153	11.5%
American Indian and Alaska Native	37	0.4%
Asian	270	2.7%
Native Hawaiian and Other Pacific Islander	9	0.1%
Some other race	395	3.9%
Two or more races	932	9.3%
Hispanic or Latino (of any race)	1,004	10.0%

In Warrenton, 6.9% of residents were foreign born, 7.2% had a disability, 94.9% of adults were high school graduates, and 39.2% of adults had a bachelor's degree or graduate degree.

92.0% of households had access to a computer, 87.1% had a broadband internet subscription, and 11.1% spoke a language other than English at home. The median household income was $78,275 while per capita income was $41,385, and 6.2% of residents lived in poverty.

In Warrenton 74.7% of the population drove alone to work, 12.4% carpooled, 3.3% walked to work, 0.0% used public transportation, 0.0% bicycled to work, 0.5% commuted by other means, and 9.1% worked from home. The average commute time was 33.1 minutes.

== In popular culture ==
The video game Fallout 3, released in 2008, takes place in the Washington DC Metropolitan Area. Of the locations in the game, the southwestern location of Warrington's name was based on Warrenton.

The 2011 film J. Edgar had scenes filmed in Warrenton.
