= Edmund George Lind =

American architect (1829-1909)

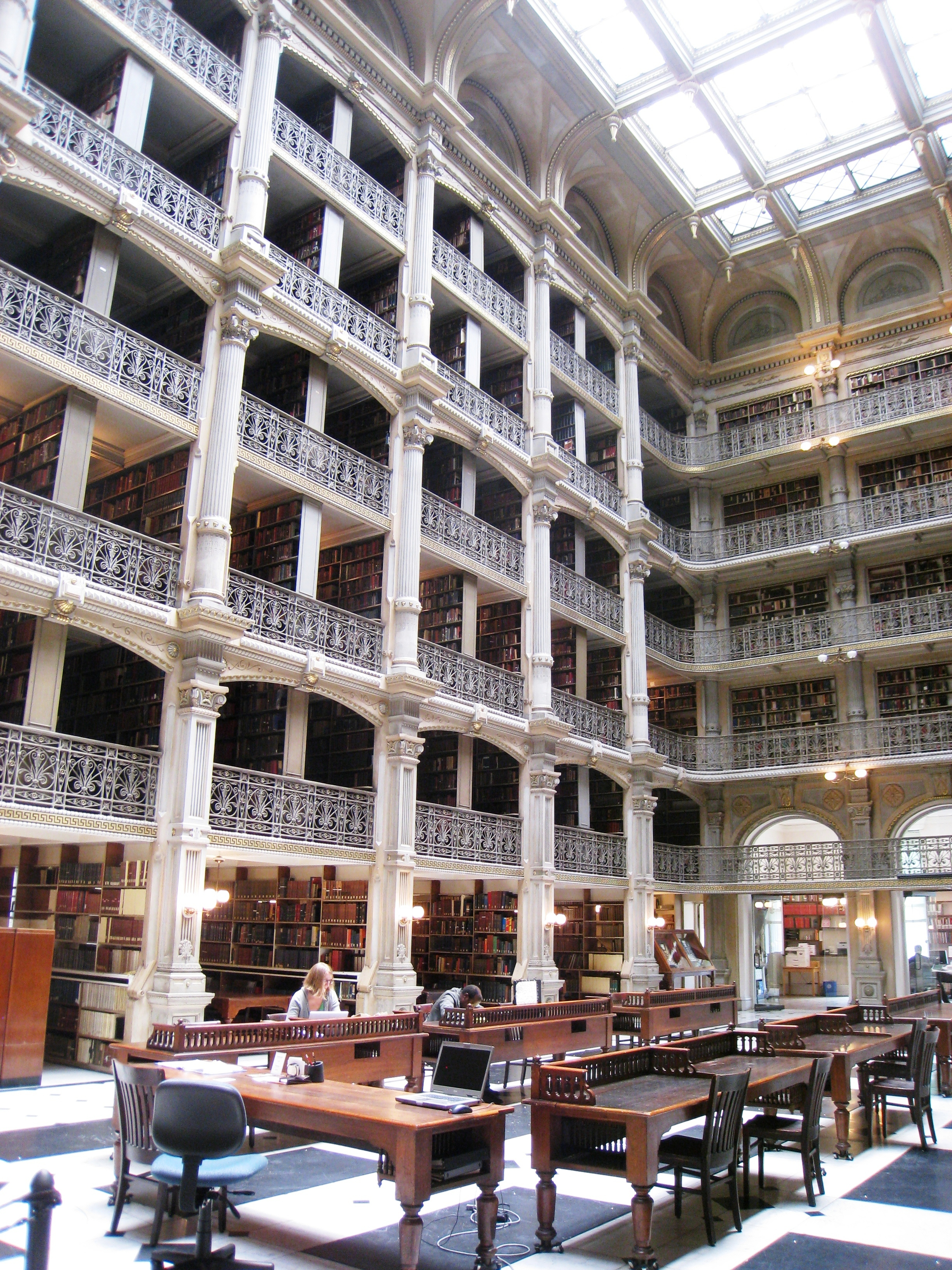
Peabody Institute Library, designed in 1875 by architect Edmund George Lind.

Edmund George Lind (June 18, 1829 – 1909) was an English-born American architect, active in Baltimore, Atlanta, and the American south.

== Biography ==
Lind was born in Islington, now a part of London, England; his father, Alexander Lind, was an engraver who had fought on the British side as a Loyalist at the Battle of Bunker Hill outside Charlestown, Massachusetts near Boston in 1775. When he was young, the family moved to Birmingham, England, where drawing and painting became his favorite amusements. After an attempt at studying law, he studied architecture at the London School of Design, then worked for several years in various architects' offices in London.

In 1855 Lind emigrated to New York City where he found employment as chief draftsman and assisting Norris G. Starkweather, designer of the brownstone Gothic-style, fourth structure for the First Presbyterian Church in Baltimore, which was finally completed with the tallest spire in the city in 1875, (first three structures from colonial times in downtown area at northwest corner of East Fayette and North Streets (now Guilford Avenue), sold the site after the Georgian/Federal-era twin-spired church from 1795, was razed to the Federal Government for a new U. S. Courthouse, built 1859-60); and then moved to more residential and up-scale, tomey, Victorian-era Mount Vernon-Belvedere neighborhood, just north of central business district at West Madison Street and Park Avenue). Lind moved to Baltimore to supervise its construction, but in 1856, left Starkweather's office to partner with William T. Murdoch, with whom he was associated with until about 1860. He married his partner's cousin, Margaret Murdoch.

In the late 1850s, Lind & Murdoch were selected to design the Peabody Institute in Baltimore, on behalf of financier George Peabody, who although born and raised in Massachusetts, spent a great deal of business time in New York City and London, had special regard for the city of Baltimore. Its original wing facing the 1815-1829 Washington Monument on the west side bordering Washington Place, which is also North Charles Street was begun in 1858, completed in 1861, and dedicated in 1866 in Peabody's presence, containing Peabody Hall (now Friedberg Concert Hall), conservatory rooms, and a picture gallery. In 1875, its east wing was begun along intersecting Mount Vernon Place (which is also East Monument Street), and in 1878, was finished under Lind's supervision. Its most impressive feature is its large central reading room, rising to the full height of the building under a skylight, with six stories of alcoves with wrought-iron work giving room for 300,000 volumes, and a checker board floor of alternating black and white marble slabs. Other examples of Lind's Baltimore work include the Memorial Protestant Episcopal Church at Bolton Street and Lafayette Avenue in the Bolton Hill neighborhood of northwest Baltimore, a church at the southwest corner of Dolphin and Etting streets, and the monument to Capt. John Gleason, of the 5th Maryland Infantry, in Cathedral Cemetery. He is also thought to have designed the English Tudor, Gothic-style building at North Howard and West Centre Streets for the Baltimore City College, the first of two on the site in 1875. The City College (formerly Central High School of Baltimore), an all-male public high school, was founded on Courtland Street (now St. Paul Street/Place and Preston Gardens), near East Saratoga Street in 1839, is the third oldest public high school in America. It was formerly located since 1843 in the old "Assembly Rooms" (a social dancing hall and place for society ladies and gentlemen for dinners, soirees, receptions and events), originally constructed in 1797 by Robert Cary Long, Sr. and also contained space for the first paid-membership and subscription Library Company of Baltimore at the northeast corner of Holliday and East Fayette Streets, until it burned along with the famous neighboring Holliday Street Theatre in a massive fire in 1873. Lind's first building was the first structure to be erected specifically for the use of the high school in its history. It collapsed in 1892, when the Howard Street Tunnel was being dug and constructed beneath from Camden Street Station in the south to the new Mount Royal Station in the north for the Baltimore and Ohio Railroad through the downtown business district. It was replaced by 1895 by a second structure for BCC, designed by the architect partnership Baldwin & Pennington, which is still there today (2013), although now renovated since 1980 for apartments and condos, known as "Chesapeake Commons".

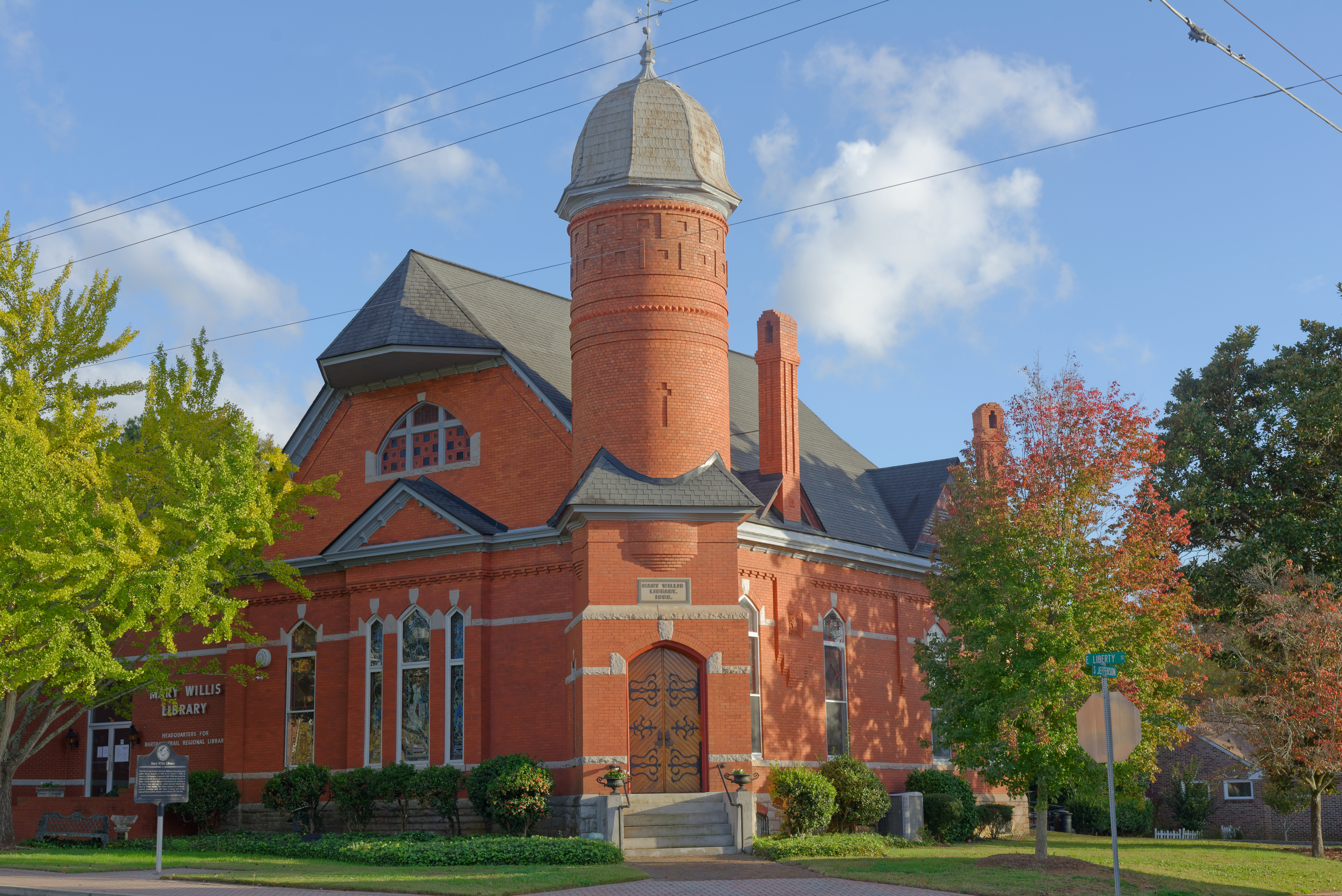
Lind designed Washington, Georgia's Mary Willis Library in 1889.

In 1882 Lind transferred his practice to Atlanta, Georgia, where for a decade he designed mansions, factories, libraries, courthouses, hotels, Masonic lodges, commercial buildings, textile mill housing, and churches in Georgia, North Carolina, Virginia, Washington, D.C., and elsewhere. His finest building in these years was the Central Presbyterian Church in Atlanta (1884). He also designed the Gwinnett County Courthouse in Lawrenceville, Georgia; the Mary Willis Library in Washington, Georgia; and the Milton Candler House in Decatur, Georgia; as well as a combined market and city hall for Guayaquil, Ecuador. Following the severe economic depression of 1893, Lind retired to Baltimore where he continued to practice on a limited basis. He died in 1909.

He completed several works in North Carolina.

During his career, Lind was active in both national and professional roles. He served as assistant supervising architect for the United States during the administration of President Ulysses S. Grant. He became a member of the American Institute of Architects in 1857, and a Fellow in 1870. Lind was a founding member of the Baltimore Chapter of the AIA in 1870 and he also served as president in 1871, and also from 1876 to 1882. He also served as vice president of the national AIA organization on two occasions. His interests extended beyond architecture. In 1894 he wrote an essay on the relationship between music and color, and transposed "Yankee Doodle", "The Star-Spangled Banner", and a number of other popular songs from music into color. He also investigated the importance of the number seven in acoustics and architecture, based on the seven colors of the rainbow and the seven sounds of the diatonic scale.

A number of his works are listed on the National Register of Historic Places, maintained by the United States Department of the Interior.

== Selected works ==
- 1858–1861: Peabody Institute Buildings, Washington Monument circle, North Charles Street (Washington Place) and East Monument Street (Mount Vernon Place); Baltimore, Maryland.
- 1858–1861: Coolmore, near Tarboro, North Carolina, an Italianate style villa designed for Dr. Joseph J. Powell.
- 1859: Waveland (addition), Virginia, 691 Carter's Run Road, Marshall, Virginia. (Lind, Edmund George), NRHP-listed
- 1864: Wilmington Club, (built as John Merrick House) 1103 North Market Street, Wilmington, Delaware. (Lind, Edmund G.), NRHP-listed
- 1872: Gwinnett County Courthouse, Lawrenceville, Georgia.
- 1875: Baltimore City College, North Howard and West Centre Streets, Baltimore, Maryland, (collapsed 1892), academic, all-male, public high school (formerly Central High School of Baltimore, founded 1839.
- 1875-1878: Peabody Institute Library, Johns Hopkins University
- 1881: Lauretum, 954 High Street, Chestertown, Maryland. (Lind, Edmund George), NRHP-listed
- 1884: Central Presbyterian Church, 201 Washington Street, S.W., Atlanta, Georgia. (Lind, Edmund G.), NRHP-listed
- 1889: Mary Willis Library, East Liberty and South Jefferson Streets, Washington, Georgia. (Lind, Edmund G.), NRHP-listed
