= The Grand (Baltimore) =

Masonic temple

Coordinates: 39°17′30.5″N 76°36′53.6″W

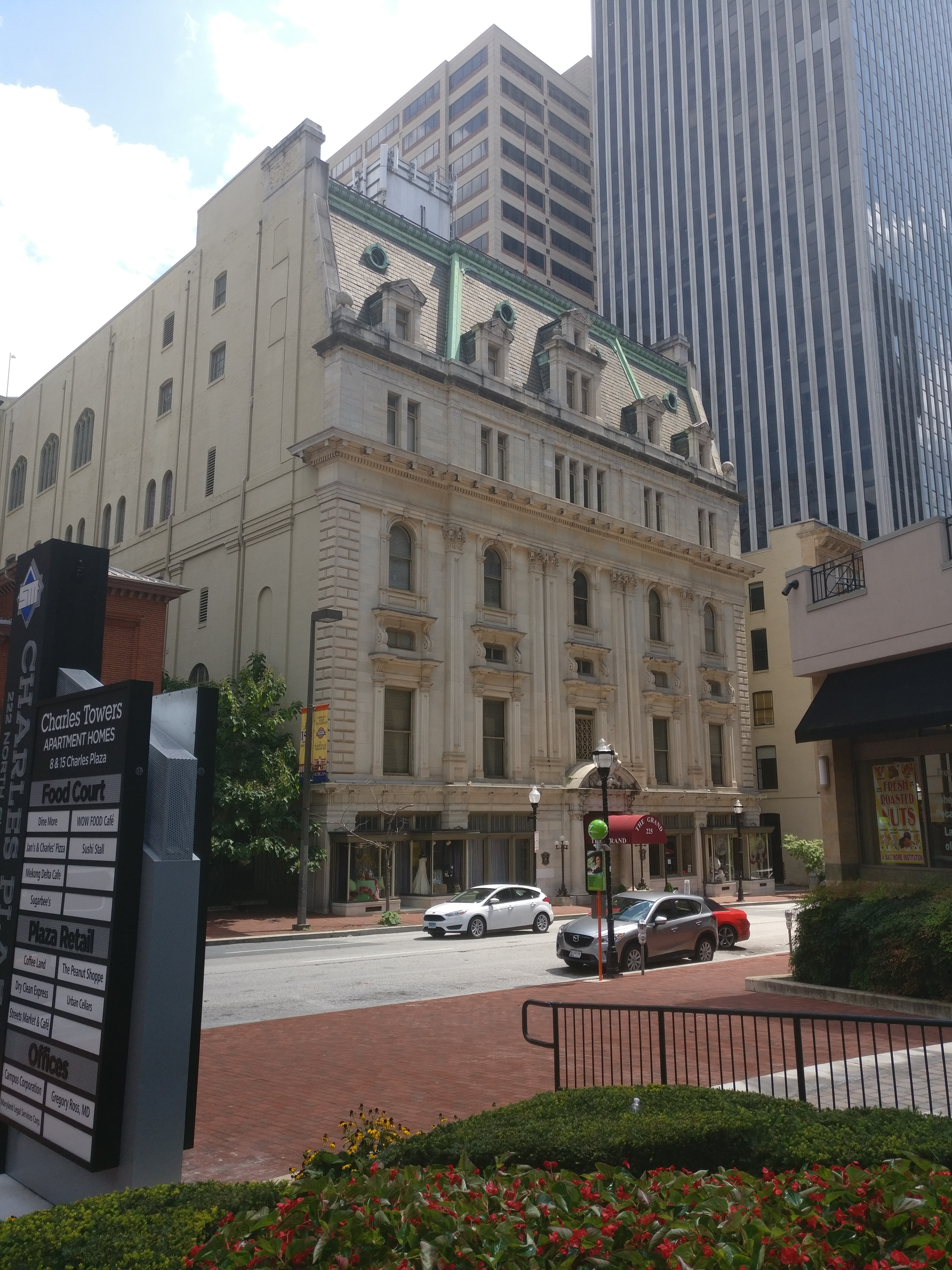
The Grand, 2017

The Grand is a Masonic temple located in Baltimore, Maryland, United States. Constructed in 1866 by the Freemasons as the Grand Lodge of Maryland Masonic Temple, the building was the headquarters for the Maryland Freemasons for over 130 years. Edmund G. Lind was commissioned to design a new Masonic Temple. The French and Italian Renaissance-inspired property is a 7-story, 90,000 square foot building in downtown Baltimore. Among its ten main meeting rooms are Edinburgh Hall, modeled after the Tudor-style Rosslyn Chapel in Scotland, and another which resembles an Egyptian temple. The building features ornate plaster moldings, a marble staircase, stained glass windows and Rococo chandeliers.

== History ==
In 1822, the Masons dedicated their first Grand Lodge of Maryland on St. Paul Street and Lexington Avenue. During the Civil War years, the Grand Lodge served as a federal courthouse for U.S. Supreme Court Chief Justice Roger B. Taney. After the war ended, Baltimore's economy returned to its economic focus and continued to expand. Later, the City of Baltimore acquired the Grand Lodge for a permanent extension of the Court House, and the Masons began construction on their second Grand Lodge. On November 20, 1866, the cornerstone was laid for the new Grand Lodge on Charles Street.

A fire destroyed the interior in 1890, and a second fire again gutted the building in 1900, also destroying the upper stories. Repairs were completed in 1909, according to designs by Joseph Evans Sperry. It was Sperry who added the Beaux Arts sixth story and attic, as well as the elaborate ornamentation around the entryway.

Its first floor was partially used for retail and its headquarters was there until 1994, when the Lodge moved to the suburbs. After the 1987 bicentennial Celebration of the founding of the Maryland Freemasons, the Masons decided to make use of a large parcel of land they owned north of the city for a new Grand Lodge. In 1993, construction of a new complex in Cockeysville, Maryland began, and the new Grand Lodge of Maryland was dedicated there in 1996.

Attracted by its beauty and recognizing the possibilities for other uses, the owners of the neighboring Tremont Suites Hotel purchased the Lodge from the Masons in 1998. The firm began planning a renovation of the structure which would honor its grace and historical significance while using it for meeting space and social functions. City of Baltimore officials were unaware of plans for restoration and condemned the building in order to erect a much-needed parking structure on the land. Working with the city, the hotel's owners crafted an agreement which would save the building and add a parking structure directly behind it. Thanks to that agreement, restoration of the magnificent structure began. A team of architects, designers, restoration specialists and world class craftsmen were assembled to restore the original interiors and replicate what they could. After years of work, the doors of the lodge, newly named Tremont Grand, were opened in September 2005. The project’s scope of work involved restoration and cleaning of exterior and all interior finishes, a new addition providing elevator and lobby access for floors 2 through 5, and a connector to The Tremont Plaza Hotel. Nearly 140 years after its original cornerstone was laid as the Grand Lodge of Maryland, the Tremont Grand was returned to a graceful and elegant state, remaining a piece of Baltimore's history.

When the hotel was renamed Embassy Suites Baltimore Inner Harbor, the building was renamed Grand Historic Venue. In 2015, the building was renamed The Grand.

== See also ==
- List of tallest buildings in Baltimore
