= Carters Run Rural Historic District =

Historic district in Virginia, United States

- U.S. National Register of Historic Places
- U.S. Historic district
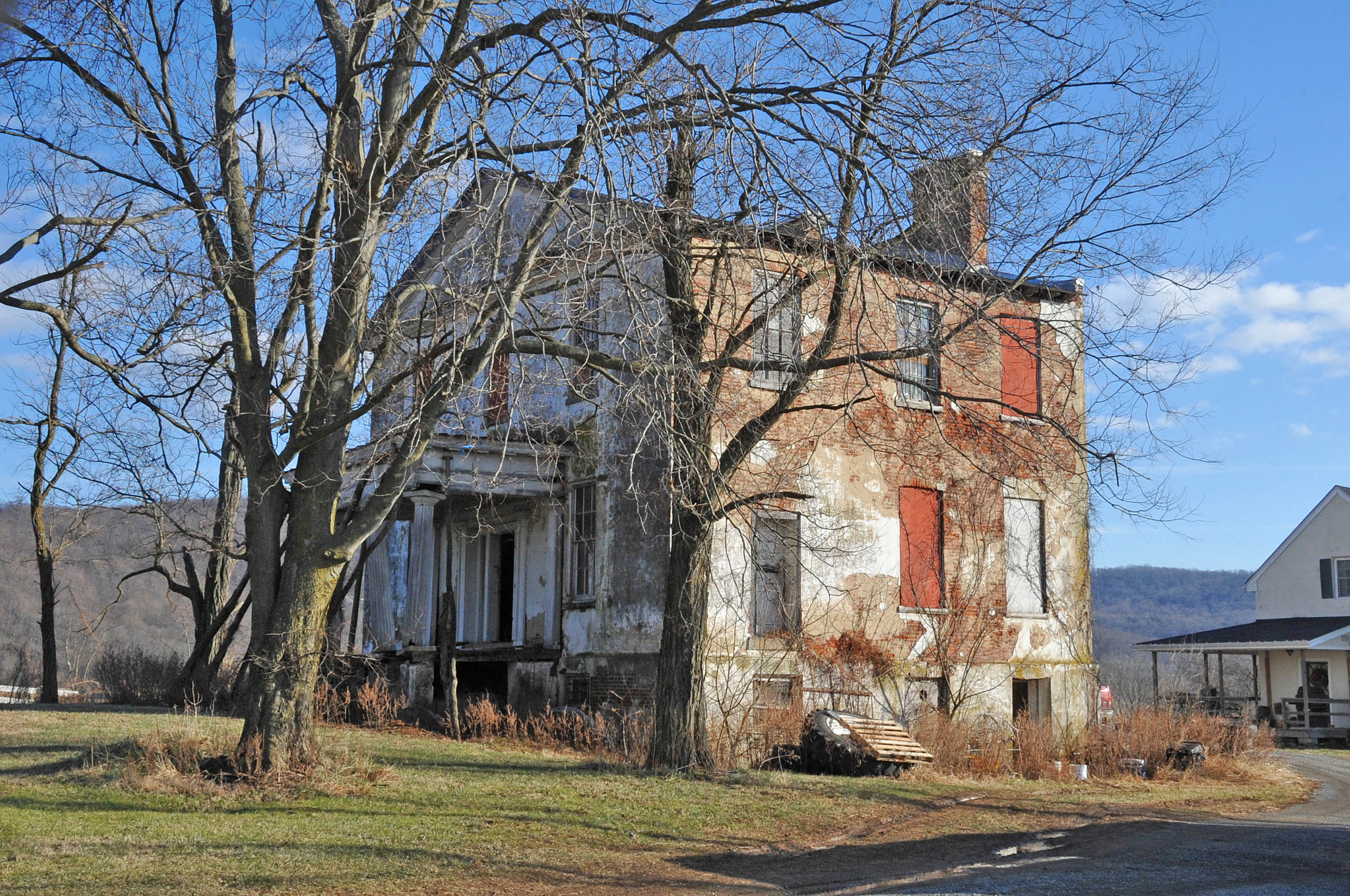
- Clover Hill, a house in the district

- Location within Northern Virginia Location within Virginia Location within the United States
- Location: Marshall, Virginia
- Coordinates: 38.833423°N 77.85789°W
- Area: 4,400 acres (1,800 ha)
- NRHP reference No.: 14000236
- Added to NRHP: May 15, 2014

The Carters Run Rural Historic District encompasses a large rural landscape in central northern Fauquier County. Covering some 4,400 acres (1,800 ha), the district extends south from near Marshall southward along Carters Run Road, the only major paved road through the district. The district also includes properties accessible from Scotts Road (County Road 719) and on the east side of Free State Road (County Road 721). Land use has for more than 200 years been almost entirely agricultural; there are no villages or commercial centers. The main structures in the district are farmhouses and agricultural outbuildings; the district notably includes the previously-listed Waveland plantation.

The district was listed on the National Register of Historic Places in 2014.

== See also ==
- National Register of Historic Places listings in Fauquier County, Virginia
