= Mary Willis (disambiguation) =

Mary Willis was an 18th-century English stage actress. Mary Willis may also refer to:

- Mary Willis Ambler (1767–1831), American wife of politician John Marshall
- Mary Willis (US Army officer) (born 1940), American retired army officer
- Mary Willis Walker (1942–2023), American crime fiction author

See also:

- Mary Willis Library, American historic public library
