= John Augustine Washington III =

Confederate and member of the Washington family

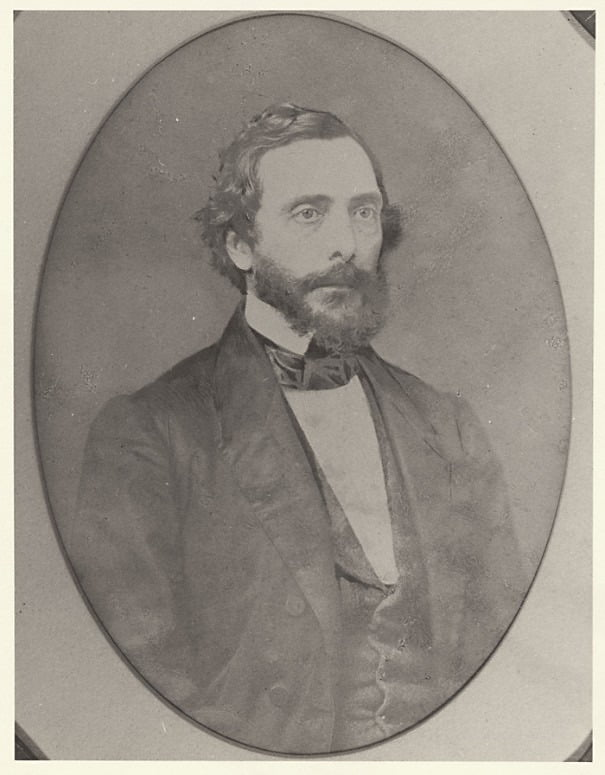
- Born: May 3, 1821; Jefferson County, Virginia (now West Virginia)
- Died: September 12, 1861 (aged 40); Cheat Mountain, Virginia (now West Virginia)
- Burial place: Zion Episcopal Church; Charles Town, West Virginia
- Military career
- Allegiance: Confederate States of America
- Service years: 1861
- Rank: Lieutenant Colonel
- Conflicts: American Civil War: Battle of Cheat Mountain †

John Augustine Washington III (3 May 1821 – 12 September 1861) was a Confederate lieutenant and aide-de-camp to Robert E. Lee. Washington was also George Washington's great grandnephew and the last member of the Washington family to own Mount Vernon.

== Early life ==
Washington was born on May 3, 1821, in Jefferson County, West Virginia—then Virginia—to John Augustine Washington II and Jane Charlotte Blackburn Washington. Washington's father inherited Mount Vernon from Bushrod Washington in 1829, which his mother inherited after his father died of heart disease 3 years later. Washington graduated from the University of Virginia in 1840.

== Pre-Civil War ==
After he graduated from college, Washington made a deal with his mother to manage her estate in exchange for $500 per year for seven years and a loan of 22 slaves. Tourists, the split of the land between George Washington's descendants and crop-related issues became concerns for Washington. Washington inherited Mount Vernon in 1855, after the death of his mother.

Despite Mount Vernon causing Washington concerns, he rejected several offers to purchase the land. Washington eventually agreed to sell Mount Vernon to Ann Pamela Cunningham for $200,000. Washington initially wanted to sell Mount Vernon to Virginia or the United States government. After selling Mount Vernon, Washington and his family moved to the Waveland estate in Fauquier County, Virginia. Washington's wife, Nelly, died due to childbirth in 1860.

== Civil War ==
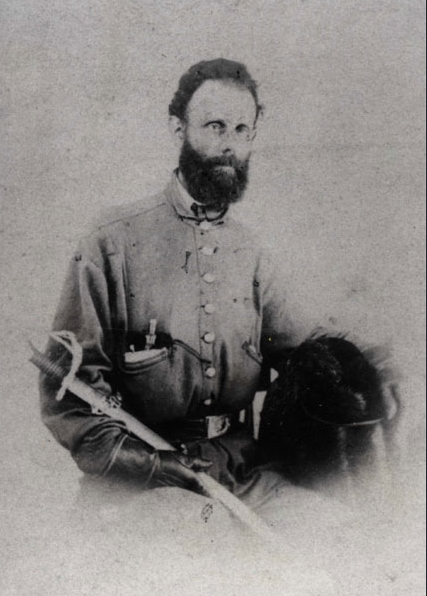
Washington in a Confederate uniform.

Washington left the Waveland estate to join the Confederate army on April 30, 1861; he was appointed to Robert E. Lee's staff on May 13, 1861. Washington was made a lieutenant colonel and, along with Walter H. Taylor, served as Lee's aide-de-camp. Newspapers in the Confederacy called him a hero and those in the Union called Washington a traitor. Newspapers in both areas were interested in Washington because of his relation to George Washington.

On September 12, 1861, Washington joined William Henry Fitzhugh Lee and two cavalrymen to scout the Union's right flank during the Battle of Cheat Mountain. He was shot in the chest by pickets from the 17th Indiana Infantry, while William Lee and the two cavalrymen rode to safety. Lee's horse was killed, but he managed to escape on Washington's horse. Washington died while the Union pickets were bringing him to their camp at Elkwater, West Virginia.

Robert E. Lee sent a messenger to Union commander Joseph J. Reynolds, after William Lee informed him of what happened during the mission. Lee asked Reynolds to return Washington's body if he died. Reynolds accepted, giving Washington's body to a Confederate force led by William Edwin Starke. Washington was buried at the churchyard of the Zion Episcopal Church in Charles Town, West Virginia. He is commemorated on a marker outside George Washington's tomb at Mount Vernon.

== Legacy ==
Confederate newspapers grieved for Washington, whom they saw as a martyr who had died for Confederate independence. Newspapers in the Union saw Washington as a traitor, whose death was deserved. Union newspapers also showed joy in Washington's death. Robert E. Lee carried the last letter written by Washington for the rest of the Civil War, and later gave the letter to Washington's eldest daughter, Louisa Washington.

In the 1900s, the Randolph County Chapter of the United Daughters of the Confederacy set up a stone monument where Washington was killed. The Shepherdstown Chapter of the United Daughters of the Confederacy placed a Confederate Iron Cross on Washington's grave.
