= Ashville Historic District (Marshall, Virginia) =

Historic district in Virginia, United States

- U.S. National Register of Historic Places
- U.S. Historic district
- Virginia Landmarks Register
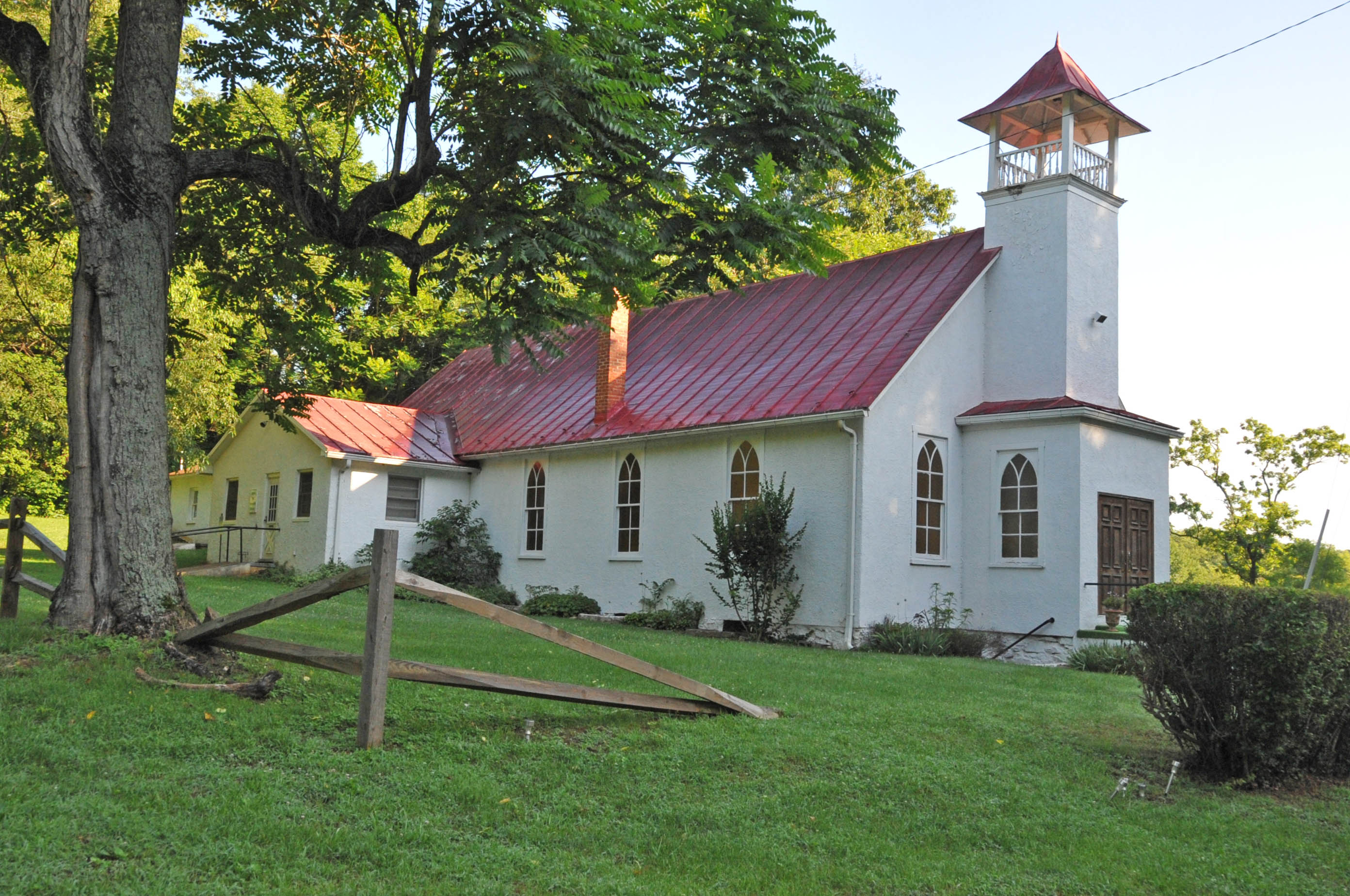

- Location within Northern Virginia Location within Virginia Location within the United States
- Location: Area including 4236-4130 Ashville Rd. and part of Old Ashville Rd., near Marshall, Virginia
- Coordinates: 38°52′00″N 77°52′22″W
- Area: 23 acres (9.3 ha)
- Built: 1870
- Architectural style: Gothic Revival
- NRHP reference No.: 04000043
- VLR No.: 030-5323

Significant dates
- Added to NRHP: February 11, 2004
- Designated VLR: December 3, 2003

Ashville Historic District is a national historic district located near Marshall, Fauquier County, Virginia. It encompasses 16 contributing buildings and 1 contributing site in the Reconstruction-era African-American rural village of Ashville. The district contains nine properties, including the Gothic Revival style Ashville Baptist Church (1899), Ashville School (1910s), Ashville Community Cemetery, and a concentration of historic dwellings and related outbuildings.

It was listed on the National Register of Historic Places in 2004.
