= Morgantown Historic District (Marshall, Virginia) =

Historic district in Virginia, United States

- U.S. National Register of Historic Places
- U.S. Historic district
- Virginia Landmarks Register
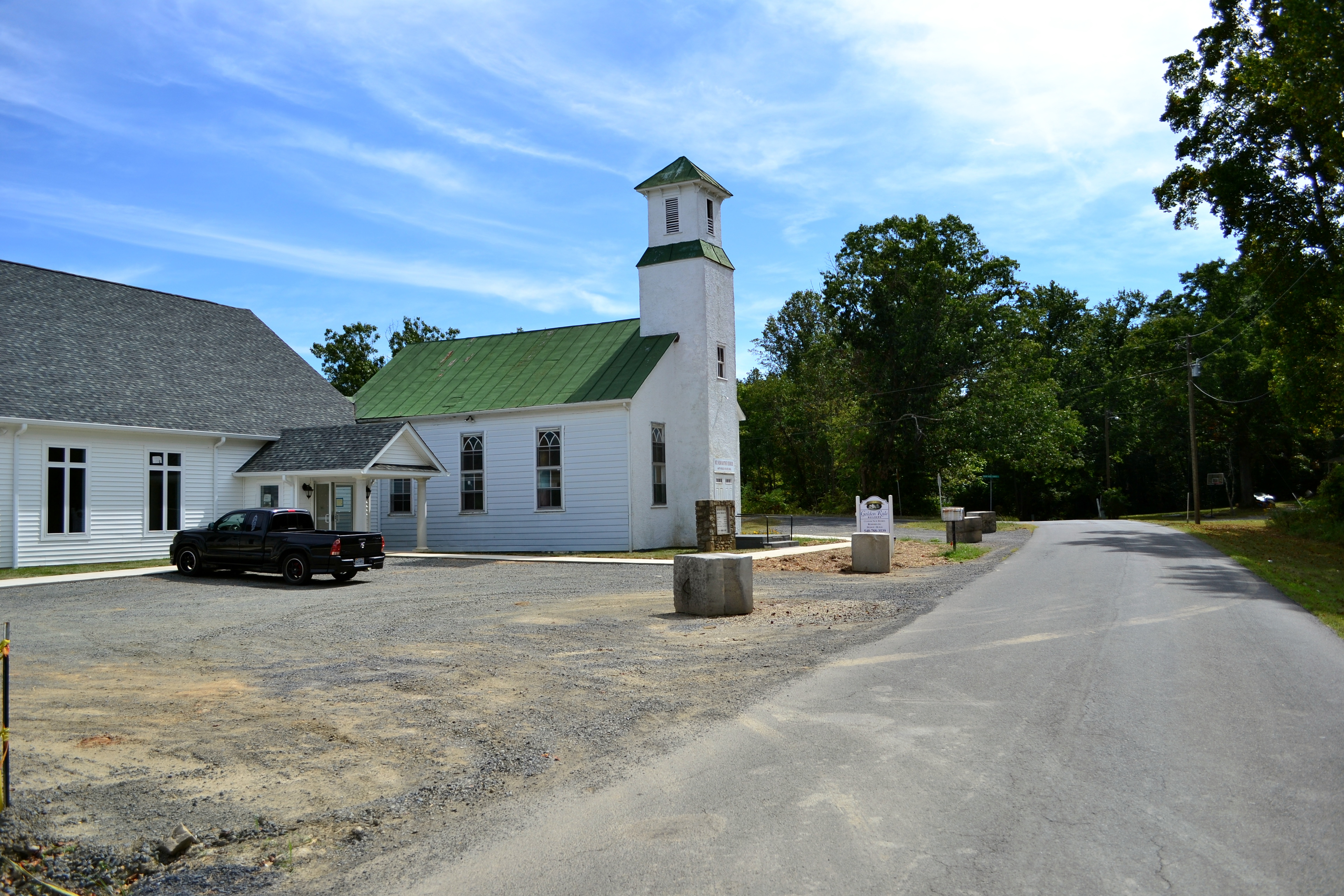
- Intersection Of Mt. Nebo and Free State Roads

- Location within Northern Virginia Location within Virginia Location within the United States
- Location: The area roughly surrounding the junction of Freestate Rd. and Mount Nebo Church Rd., as well as a discontiguous cemetery located approximately 0.2 miles (0.32 km) to the southeast at the end of Mount Nebo Church Rd., near Marshall, Virginia
- Coordinates: 38°50′25″N 77°52′35″W
- Area: 9 acres (3.6 ha)
- NRHP reference No.: 04000045
- VLR No.: 030-5322

Significant dates
- Added to NRHP: February 11, 2004
- Designated VLR: December 3, 2003

Morgantown Historic District is a national historic district located near Marshall, Fauquier County, Virginia. It encompasses 7 contributing buildings and 2 contributing sites in the Reconstruction-era African-American rural village of Morgantown. The district contains four dwellings, the Mount Nebo Baptist Church (1902), an abandoned Morgantown School (c. 1891), a meat house, the ruins of an outbuilding, and a cemetery.

It was listed on the National Register of Historic Places in 2004.
