= George Peabody Library =

Research library in Baltimore, Maryland

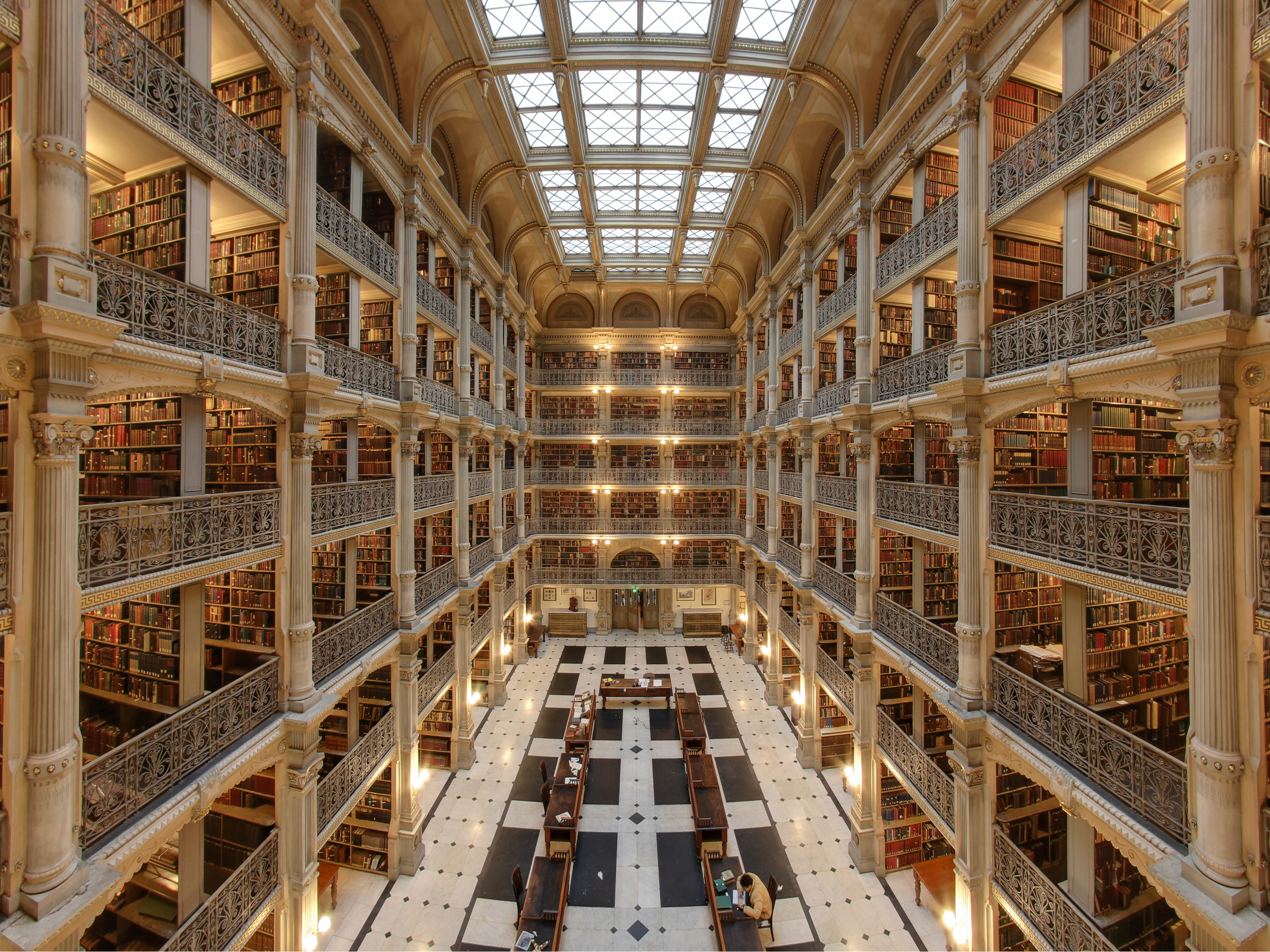
- Interior of the George Peabody Library
- 39°17′50.5″N 76°36′54″W
- Location: 17 E. Mount Vernon Place; Baltimore, Maryland, United States
- Type: Academic library
- Established: 1878
- Architect: Edmund George Lind

Collection
- Size: 300,000

Other information
- Parent organization: Johns Hopkins University
- Website: www.library.jhu.edu/library-hours/george-peabody-library/

Baltimore City Landmark
- Designated: 1975

The George Peabody Library at Johns Hopkins University, focuses on research into the 19th century. It was formerly the Library of the Johns Hopkins Peabody Institute of music in the City of Baltimore, and it is located on the Peabody campus at West Mount Vernon Place north of downtown Baltimore, Maryland. The collections are available for use by the general public, in keeping with Baltimore merchant and philanthropist George Peabody's goal to create a library "for the free use of all persons who desire to consult it".

== History ==
The George Peabody Library was funded by George Peabody (1795–1869). He had become a wealthy man in Baltimore through commerce during the 1810s and 1820s, following his brief service in the state militia defending the city against the British attack during the War of 1812. He "gave $300,000 as a beginning sum for the Peabody Institute" in February 1857. The institute was originally planned to open in 1860, but state border conflict in the region caused by the American Civil War delayed its establishment and construction until 1866. John Morris, the first librarian, and Library Committee chairman John Pendleton Kennedy both used this time to study and catalogue the collections of the greatest libraries in the U.S. and Europe. Morris then created a list of 50,000 books, and actively pursued their retrieval regardless of difficulty or expense. This practice was a great success and was continued by Nathaniel Holmes Morrison, the next librarian. Scientist Philip Reese Uhler, Morrison's assistant, expanded this practice to scientific texts by seeking out advice from experts in several scientific fields. This form of collection development has become a standard for academic libraries.

When it opened, Peabody dedicated the West Wing of the Peabody Institute to the citizens of Baltimore in appreciation of their kindness and hospitality. The institute was designed to be a cultural center for the City of Baltimore, with plans for an art gallery, a music school, a public lecture series, a series of cash awards with gold medals known as "Peabody Prizes" for the top graduates of the city's public high schools, and a public, non-circulating reference library.

The current library structure in the East Wing was designed by local architect Edmund George Lind and opened to the public in 1878. The library remained part of the Peabody Institute until 1967, when it was transferred to the City of Baltimore and became a department of the nearby Enoch Pratt Free Library. It was transferred to Johns Hopkins University in 1982 and became part of the Milton S. Eisenhower Library's Special Collections department.

== Collection ==
The main collection reflects broad interests but is focused on the 19th century, in keeping with Peabody's desire for it to be "well furnished in every department of knowledge and of the most approved literature". The library's 300,000 volume collection is particularly strong in religion, British art, architecture, topography and history; American history, biography, and literature; Romance languages and literature; history of science; and geography, exploration and travel. Some of the collection's highlights include first editions by Poe, Hawthorne, Melville, and H. L. Mencken, Diderot’s 28-volume Encyclopédie, early editions of Don Quixote, Maryland and Baltimore maps, natural history folios, a first edition of Darwin’s On the Origin of Species, and fore-edge books.

== Building ==
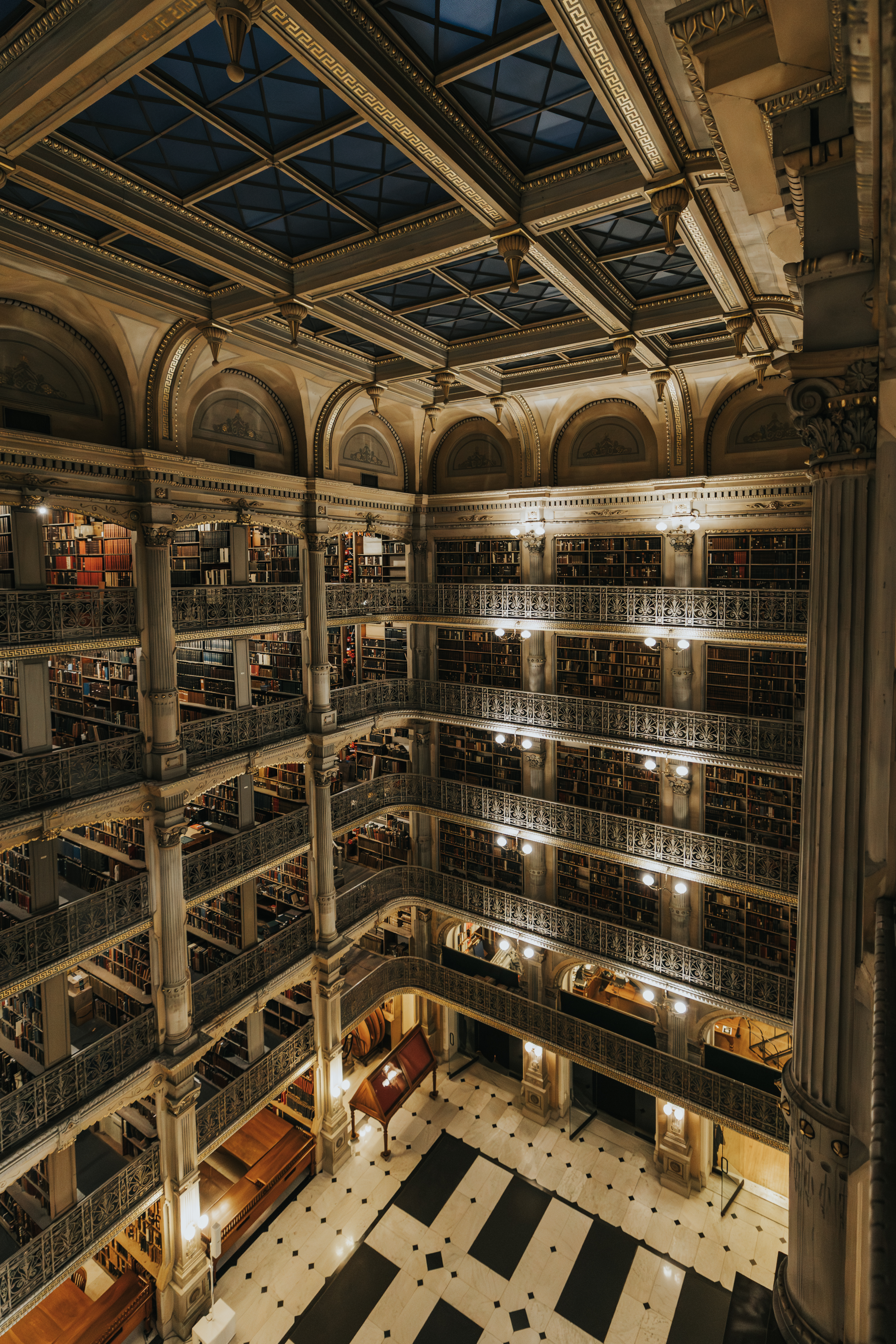
George Peabody Library at night during an Art+Feminism event

The library interior is often regarded as one of the most beautiful libraries in the world. It was completed in 1878, designed by Baltimore architect Edmund G. Lind in collaboration with Peabody provost Nathaniel H. Morison. It was Morrison who described it as a "cathedral of books". The neo-Greco interior features an atrium that rises 61 feet to a latticed skylight of frosted glass, surrounded by five tiers of ornamental black cast-iron balconies produced by the Bartlett-Hayward Company and gold-scalloped columns containing book stacks. The library underwent a $1 million renovation and refurbishment between July 2002 and May 2004.

== Private events ==
The George Peabody Library operates as an event venue. Event fees support the library's collections, services, and programs.
