= Waveland (Marshall, Virginia) =

Historic house in Virginia, United States

- U.S. National Register of Historic Places
- U.S. Historic district – Contributing property
- Virginia Landmarks Register
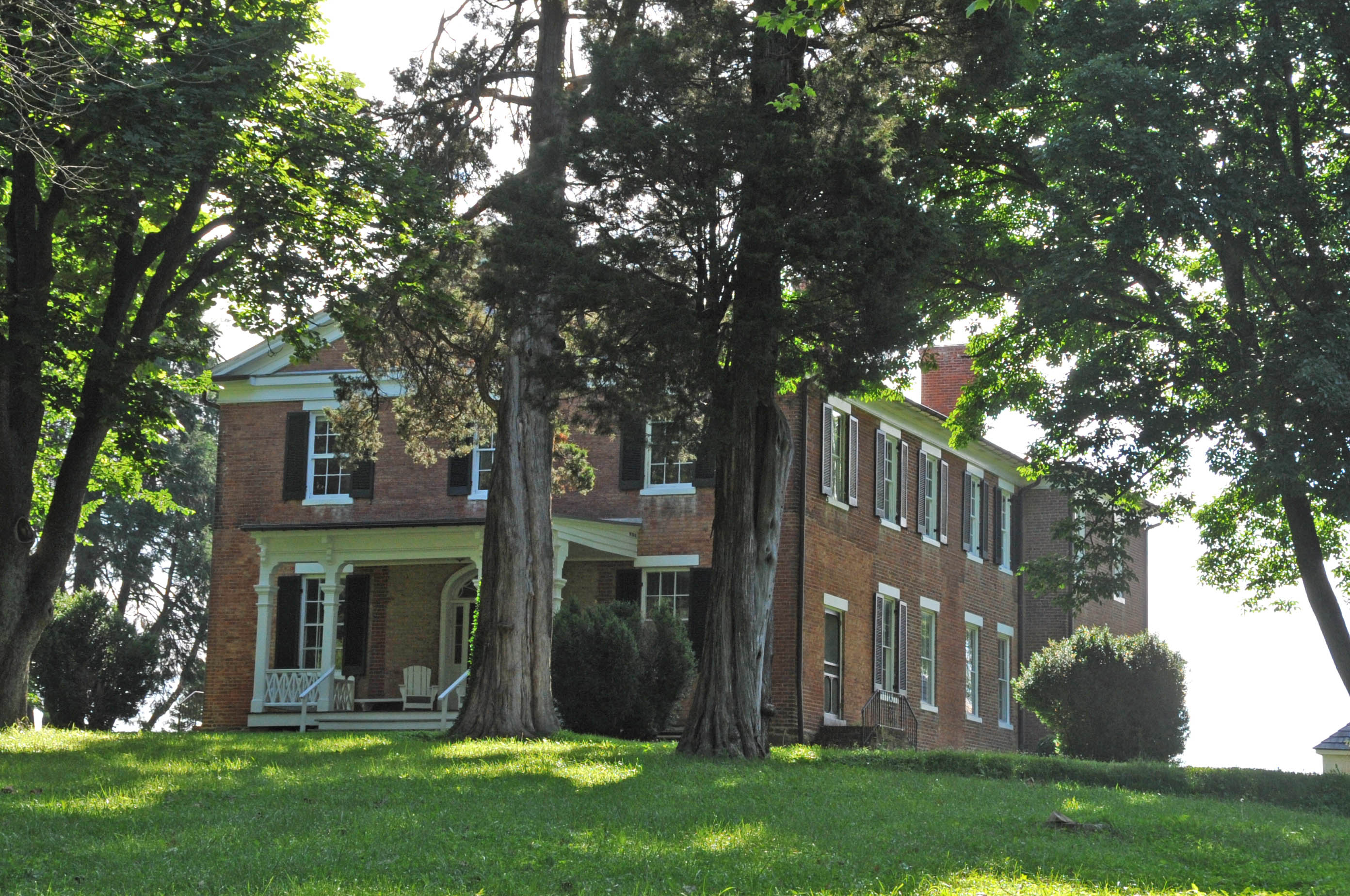

- Location within Northern Virginia Location within Virginia Location within the United States
- Location: VA 691, Carter's Run Rd., near Marshall, Virginia
- Coordinates: 38°50′00″N 77°51′48″W
- Area: 866 acres (350 ha)
- Built: c. 1835, 1859
- Architect: Lind, Edmund George
- Architectural style: Greek Revival
- Part of: Carters Run Rural Historic District (ID14000236)
- NRHP reference No.: 04000888
- VLR No.: 030-0512

Significant dates
- Added to NRHP: August 20, 2004
- Designated CP: May 15, 2014
- Designated VLR: December 3, 2003

Waveland is a historic plantation house and farm located near Marshall, Fauquier County, Virginia in the Carter's Run Rural Historic District. It was individually listed on the National Register of Historic Places in 2004, and the surrounding district listed in 2014.

== History ==
The surrounding land had been granted to Rev. Alexander Scott by Lord Fairfax in 1727, and later inherited by his nephew Rev. James Scott of Dettingen Parish in Prince William County, but the Scott family never lived on the property. In 1803, Cuthbert Scott and James Horner received the deeds, and four years later sold the land to local farmer and merchant James Morgan, who in 1811 also acquired an adjacent parcel from John Marshall. James Morgan and his brother William also operated several nearby grist and sawmills, as well as a business several counties to the west in Lynchburg. James Morgan actually lived on the "Clover Hill" plantation nearby, and after his death, his daughter Caroline married Dr. James Henry Loughborough (1807-1862). After a court-ordered distribution of the late James Morgan's land, Dr. Loughborough made deals with William Morgan (either Caroline's brother or uncle) and another man, acquired this property and built the mansion between about 1835 and 1839. However, he sold his Fauquier County medical practice in 1837, moved to Loudoun County by 1841, and moved his family to Louisiana in 1844. There, Dr. Loughborough owned a sugar plantation he called "Esperance" and after providing medical service during an epidemic in New Orleans which earned him a civic commendation, was elected to the Louisiana state senate. Dr. Loughborough had been born near Washington, D.C. where his father Nathan Loughborough served as a Treasury Department official under President John Adams and had become wealthy with investments in a bank as well as the Rockville Turnpike and later the Chesapeake and Ohio Canal, and had received his medical education in Philadelphia. During the American Civil War, Dr. Loughborough aligned with the Confederacy, and returned to Virginia after his son Nathan died at the Battle of Cheat Mountain. Although that death left Dr. Loughborough despondent and may have contributed to his death in April 1862, he and his wife had sold Waveland nearly two decades earlier to her brother William Morgan, and it had several owners before the Civil War.

The property is also historically significant for its connection with John Augustine Washington III (1821-1861), who hired architect Edmund Lind in 1858 to construct an addition to Waveland after agreeing to sell Mount Vernon to the Mount Vernon Ladies' Association. Not long after Washington occupied Waveland, he accepted a commission as Lt.Col. in the Confederate States Army, and died in September 1861, also during the Battle of Cheat Mountain. The ruins of Washington's eight-dwelling slave quarter remained on the property at the time of its historic listing.

== Architecture ==
The two-story, three bay by five bay, brick dwelling reflects the Greek Revival style. It has a front gable roof and sits on an English basement. A six-bay-wide, two bay-deep rear addition designed by noted English architect Edmund George Lind (1829–1909) was added in 1859, creating a "T"-plan dwelling. Also on the property are the contributing meat house (c. 1835), stuccoed frame farmhouse (c. 1860), cistern (c. 1835), stone spring house ruin (c. 1835), and stone slave quarters ruin (c. 1835).
