= Number 18 School in Marshall =

- U.S. National Register of Historic Places
- Virginia Landmarks Register
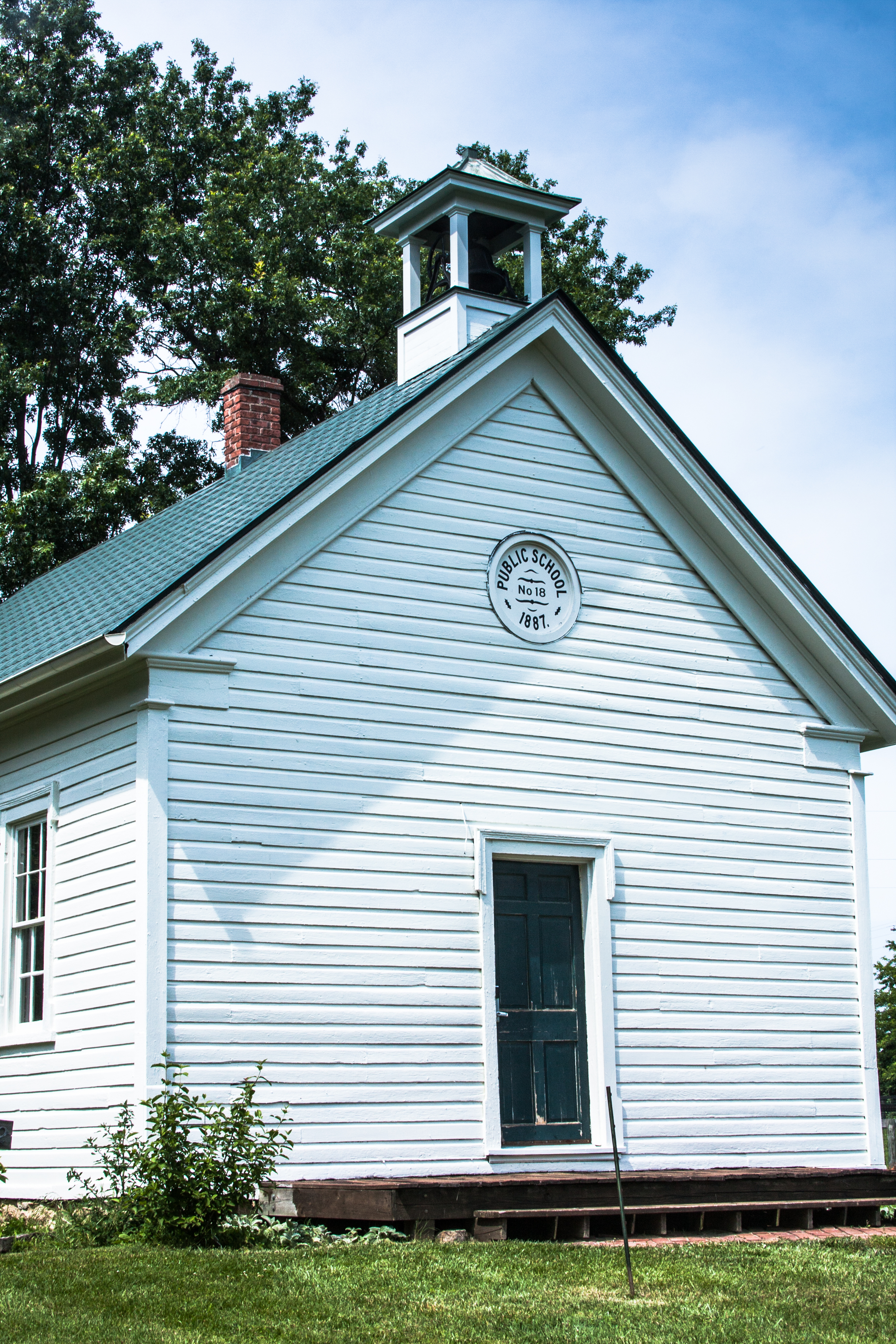
- Number 18 School in Marshall, June 2011

- Location within Northern Virginia Location within Virginia Location within the United States
- Location: Junction of VA 55 and VA 622, Marshall, Virginia
- Coordinates: 38°52′10″N 77°49′53″W
- Area: 1 acre (0.40 ha)
- Built: 1887
- Architectural style: Late 19th And 20th Century Revivals
- NRHP reference No.: 97001405
- VLR No.: 030-0135

Significant dates
- Added to NRHP: November 7, 1997
- Designated VLR: July 2, 1997

Number 18 School in Marshall is a historic one-room school located at Marshall, Virginia, United States. It was built about 1887, and is a rectangular frame building, covered with weatherboard, and resting on a stone foundation, with a metal gable roof with a centrally located brick stove flue. Atop the roof is a reconstructed cupola. It is the only surviving unimpaired one-room schoolhouse in Fauquier County. It was originally constructed for white students, then from the fall of 1910 to 1964 (when it closed), a school for African-American children.

It was listed on the National Register of Historic Places in 1997.
