= Fresta Valley Christian School =

Location
- Marshall, Virginia
- Coordinates: 38.772644°N 77.9066537°W

Information
- Funding type: Private
- Founded: 1977
- Grades: PK–12
- Enrollment: 300

Fresta Valley Christian School is a private, co-educational Christian school in Marshall, Virginia. Founded in 1977, the school has grown to provide education to children from preschool to the 12th grade. The school accepts children primarily from Fauquier county, but also from other nearby counties.(1) The school provides education for approximately 300 children and maintains a student-to-teacher ratio of close to 14.

== Religious views ==
Fresta Valley Christian School remains independent of any church, group, or organization. However, the school does provide a look into its teaching worldview by listing the principles it holds to be true. The school teaches as follows:

- The Bible to be the inspired, the only infallible, authoritative Word of God;
- that there is one God, eternally existent in three persons: Father, Son, and Holy Spirit;
- in the deity of our Lord Jesus Christ, in His virgin birth, in His sinless life, in His miracles, in His vicarious and atoning death through His shed blood, in His bodily resurrection, in His ascension to the right hand of the Father and in His personal return in power and glory;
- that for the salvation of the lost and sinful man, regeneration by the Holy Spirit is absolutely essential;
- in the present ministry of the Holy Spirit by whose indwelling the Christian is enabled to live a godly life;
- in the resurrection of both the saved and the lost, they that are saved unto the resurrection of life and they that are lost unto the resurrection of damnation;
- in the spiritual unity of believers in our Lord Jesus Christ.

These beliefs are similar to those of non-denominational, Protestant Christianity.

== History ==
The school was founded in the summer of 1977 by the family of Robert and Donna Buckley. The Buckleys were committed to making sure their six children received a quality, Christian education, but after moving to Fauquier county in 1975, the trek to their old school soon proved too long to bear. Their solution to this was to create their own Christian school. Thus, Fresta Valley Christian School began in the Buckley family home.

When the school quickly grew to 28 students, the Buckley family realized their home could not accommodate so many students, so Fresta Valley moved into St. James Episcopal Church in Warrenton, Virginia. However, enrollment continued to rise, and as the number of students climbed towards 100, the school decided to obtain permits for land and a building. In 1982, the main building of Fresta Valley Christian school was completed on the property of the Buckley family, where the school started. After additions to the building in 1987, 1992, 1996, and 2002, the school's infrastructure reached its current state.

== Athletics ==
Fresta Valley Christian School is involved with 2 separate sport conferences. The VACA (Virginia Association of Christian Athletes) and the VMSC (Valley Middle School Conference) sponsor most of the athletic sporting events that Fresta Valley is involved with. The VACA is made up of eighteen different Christian school teams, which are split into Northern and Southern divisions, providing both regional and state levels of competition. The VMSC is composed of seven different private and Christian middle school teams, mostly residing in northern Virginia.

== Sources ==
http://www.greatschools.org/virginia/marshall/2134-Fresta-Valley-Christian-School/

https://www.youtube.com/watch?v=tbBNXK8ZPmo

http://www.yellowpages.com/marshall-va/mip/fresta-valley-christian-school-8692462

http://www.schooldigger.com/go/VA/schools/9999926368/school.aspx

https://web.archive.org/web/20121109212600/http://high-schools.com/schools/103163/fresta-valley-christian-school.html
