= Marshall Historic District (Marshall, Virginia) =

Historic district in Virginia, United States

- U.S. National Register of Historic Places
- U.S. Historic district
- Virginia Landmarks Register
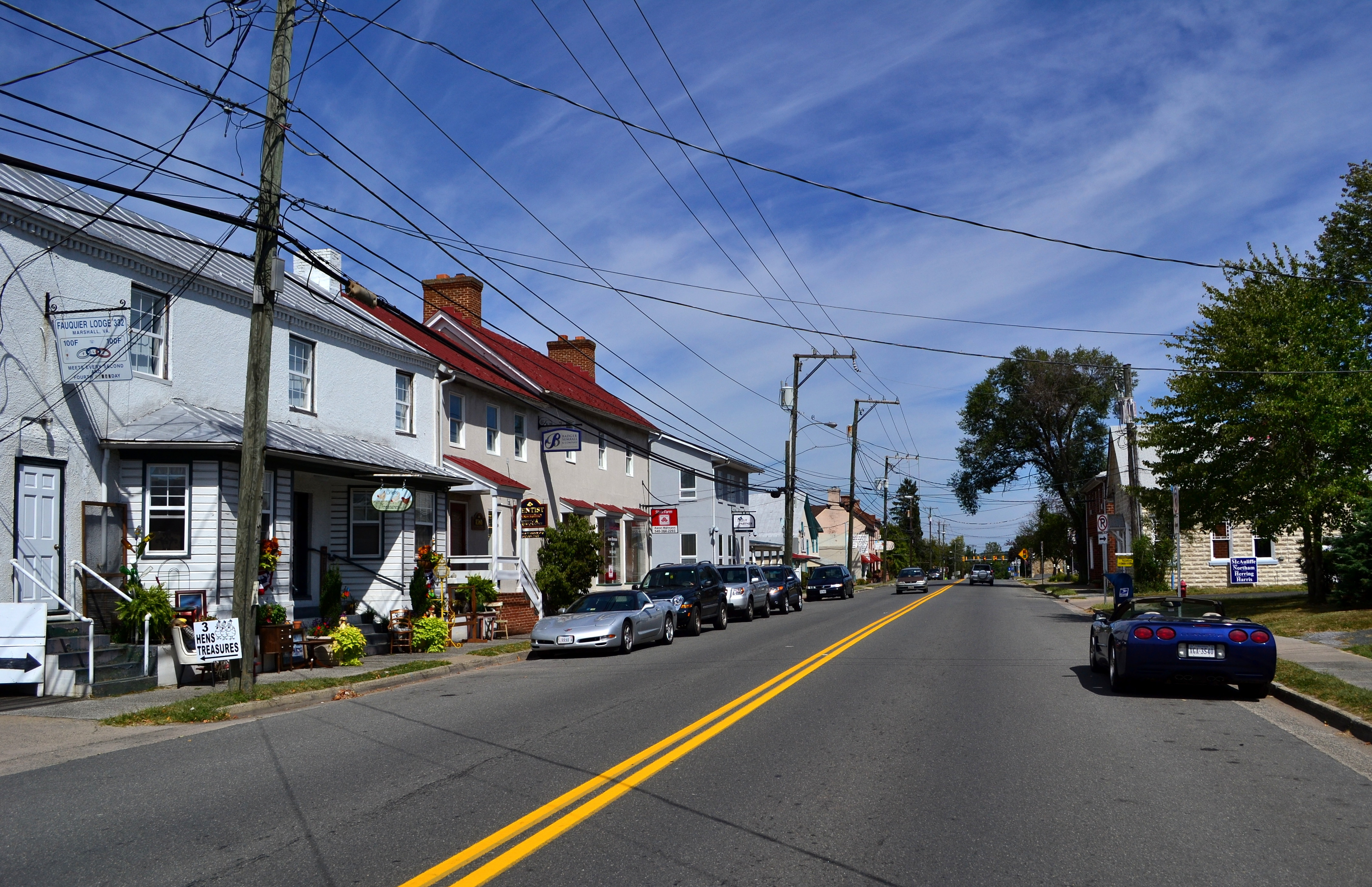
- Marshall, Virginia Historic District

- Location within Northern Virginia Location within Virginia Location within the United States
- Location: Including parts of Anderson R., Emerald Ln., Frost St., Main St., Rosstown Rd. Wild Aster Ct. and Winchester Rd., Marshall, Virginia
- Coordinates: 38°51′59″N 77°51′17″W
- Area: 99 acres (40 ha)
- Built: 1771
- Built by: Cain, H.L.; Fleming, Irvin, et al.
- Architectural style: Federal, Gothic Revival, et al.
- NRHP reference No.: 07000191
- VLR No.: 030-5156

Significant dates
- Added to NRHP: March 19, 2007
- Designated VLR: December 6, 2006

Marshall Historic District is a national historic district located at Marshall, Fauquier County, Virginia. It encompasses 314 contributing buildings and 3 contributing sites in the rural village of Marshall. The district represents a collection of historic buildings with a wide range of building types and architectural styles that date from the end of the 18th century to the mid-20th century. Notable buildings include the Fauquier Heritage and Preservation Foundation building (c. 1771), hosteller's house for Rector's Ordinary (c. 1800), a store and Confederate post office (c. 1805), the Elgin House (c. 1820, 1892), former Marshall Pharmacy (c. 1830), the Foley Building (c. 1830), the Gothic Revival style Trinity Episcopal Church (1849), Salem Baptist Church (1929), Marshall United Methodist Church (1899), and the Marshall Ford Company (1916), reputed to be the oldest building built as a Ford dealership in the United States that is still functioning as such.

It was listed on the National Register of Historic Places in 2007.

== Gallery ==
Some of the contributing buildings in the Marshall Historic District:

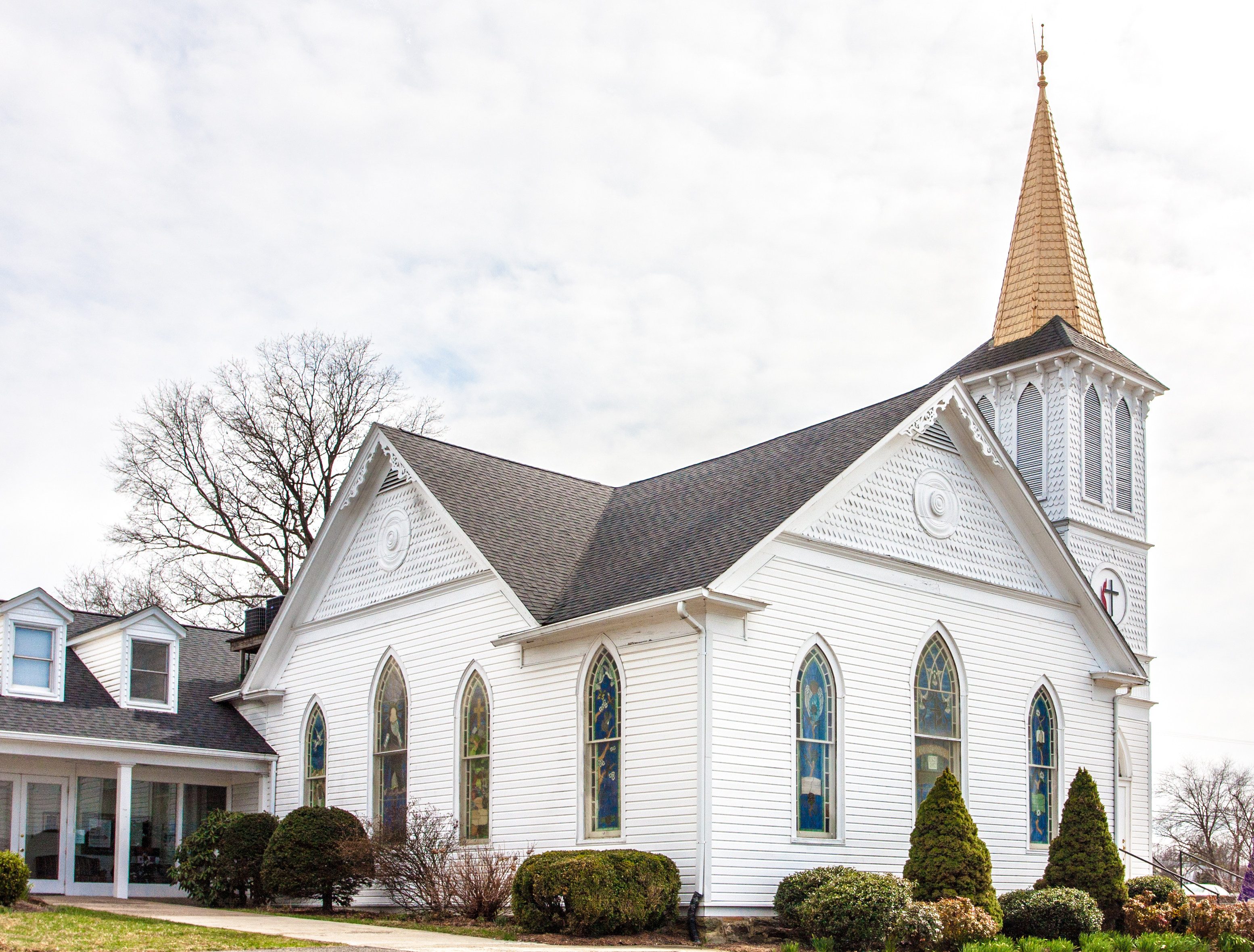
Marshall Methodist Church

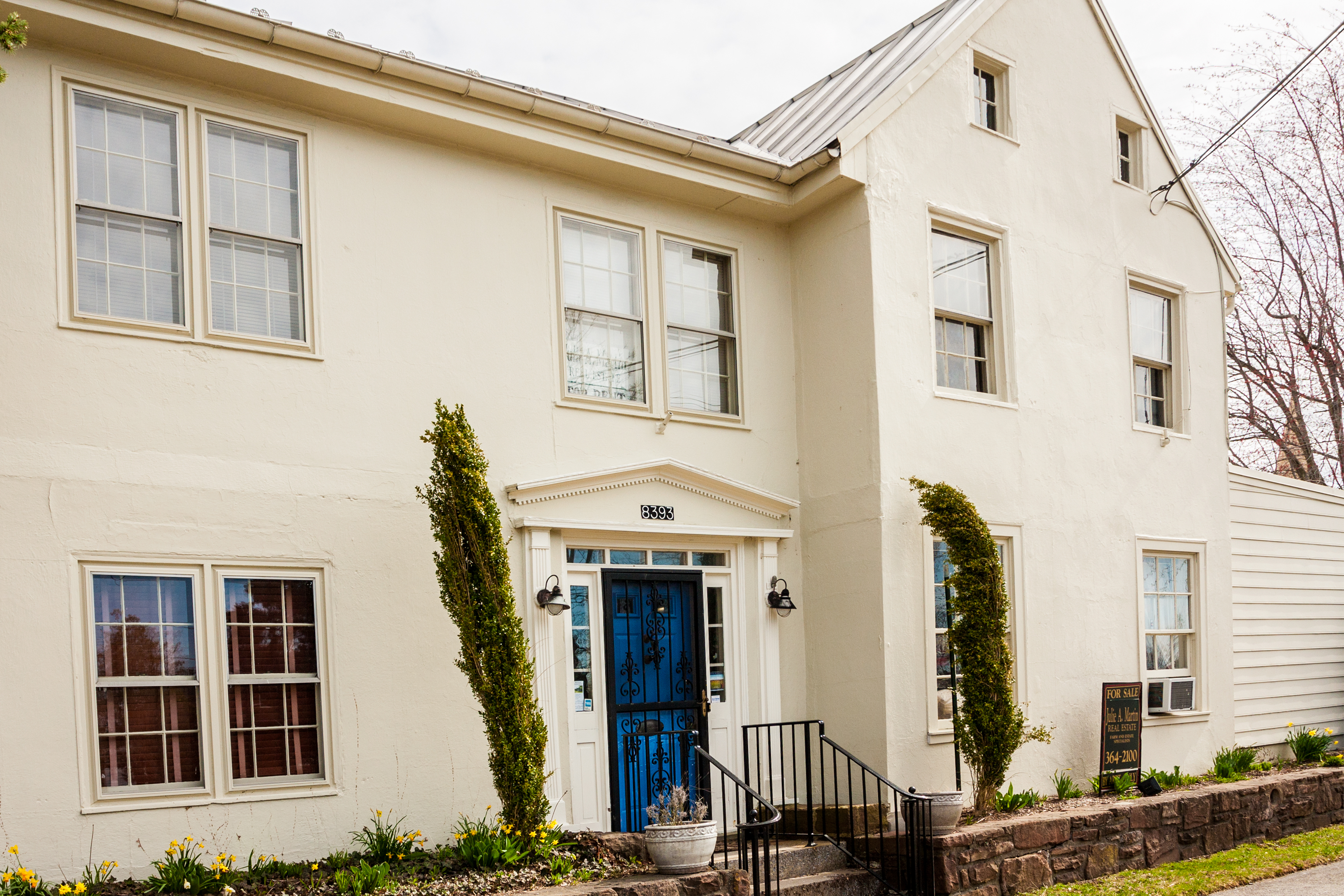
8393 W. Main St.

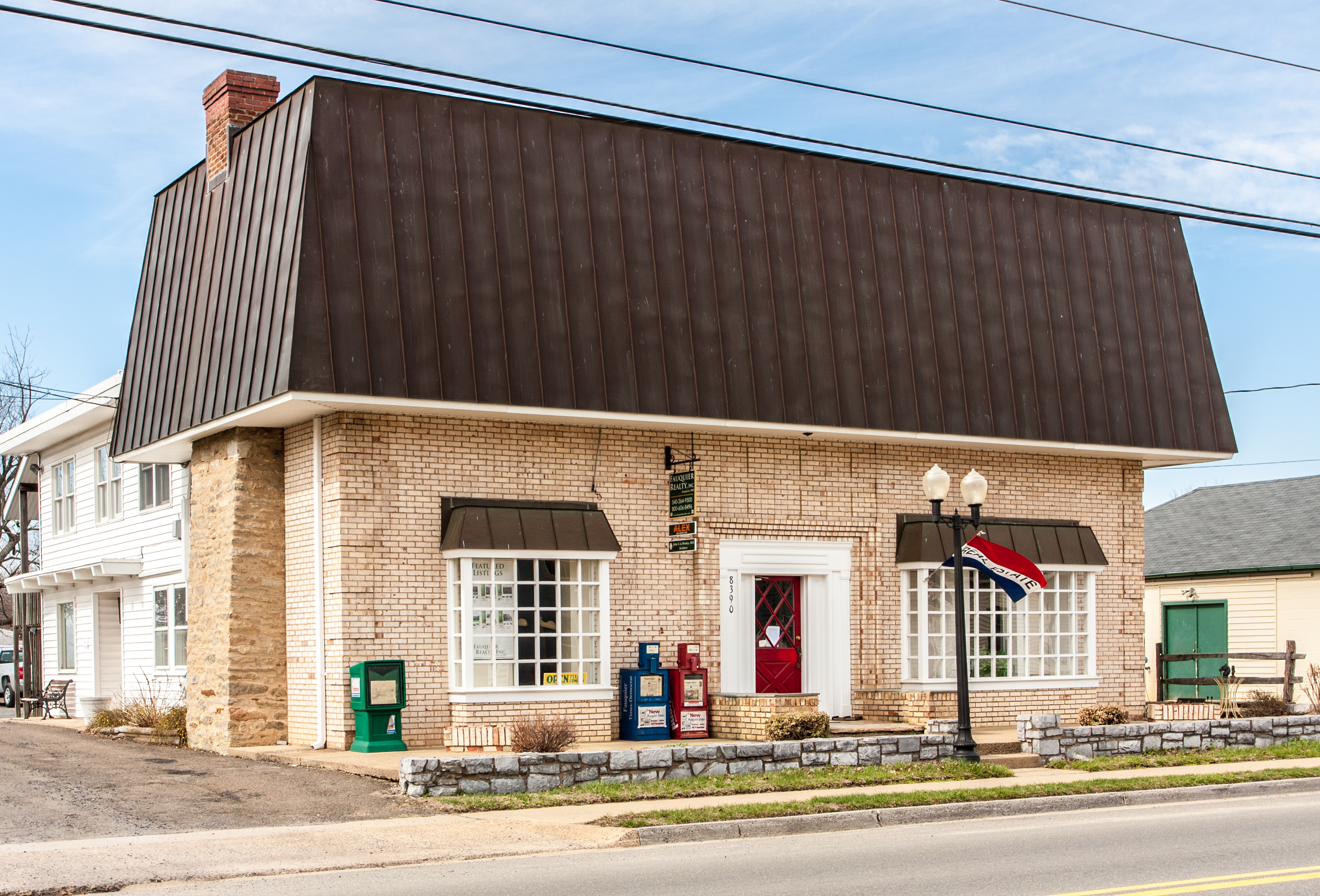
8390 W. Main St.

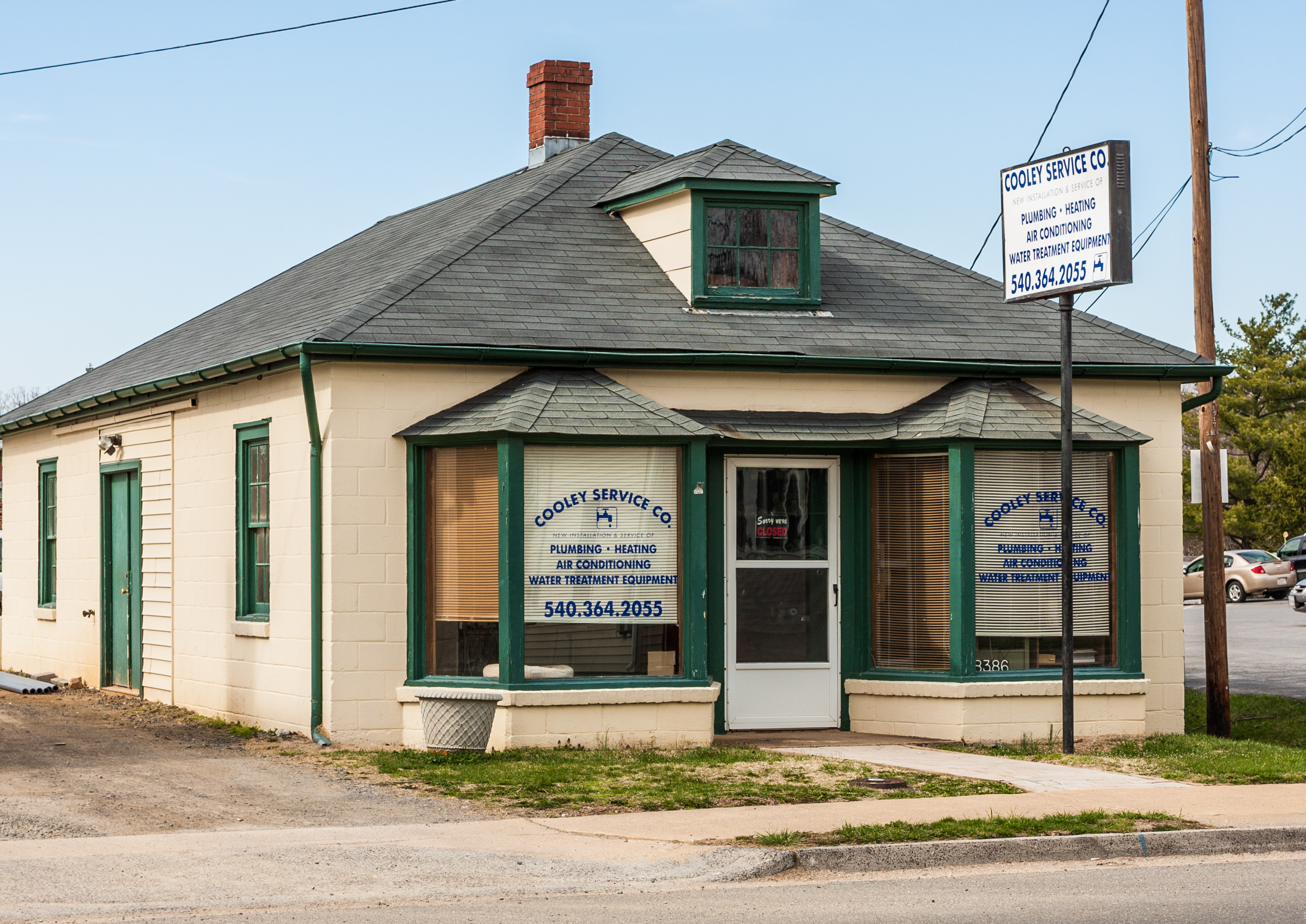
8386 W. Main St.

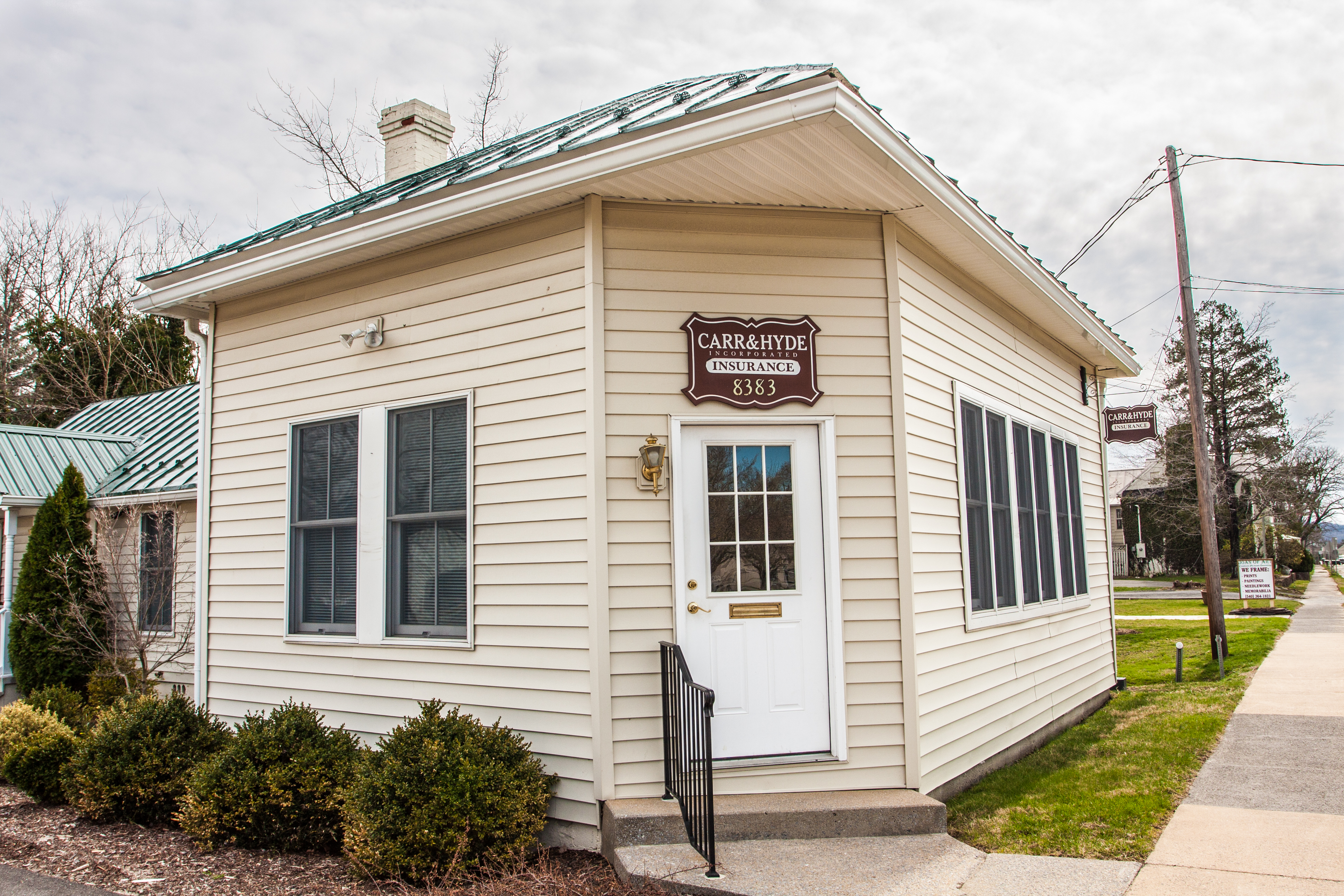
8383 W. Main St.

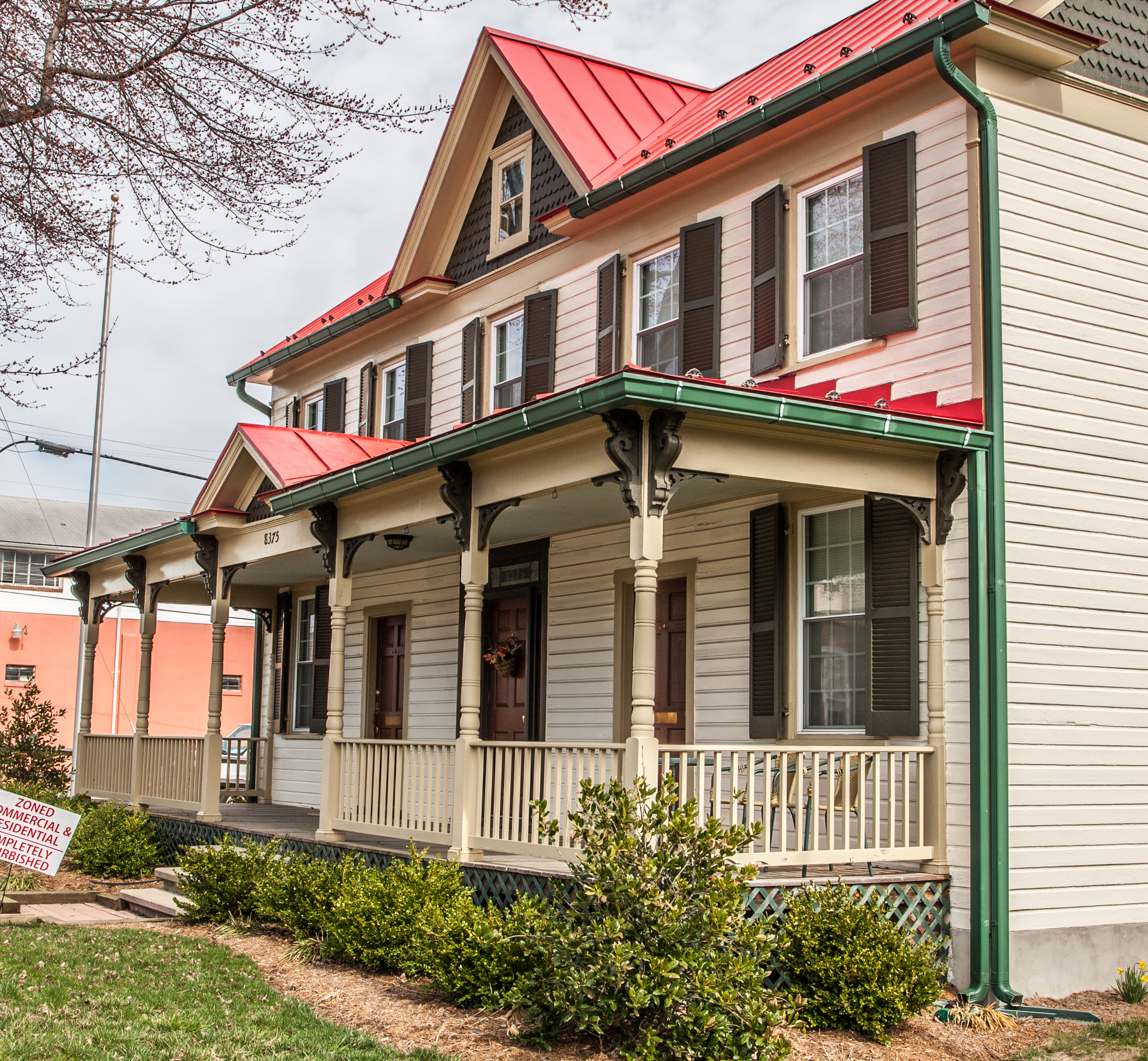
8375 W. Main St.

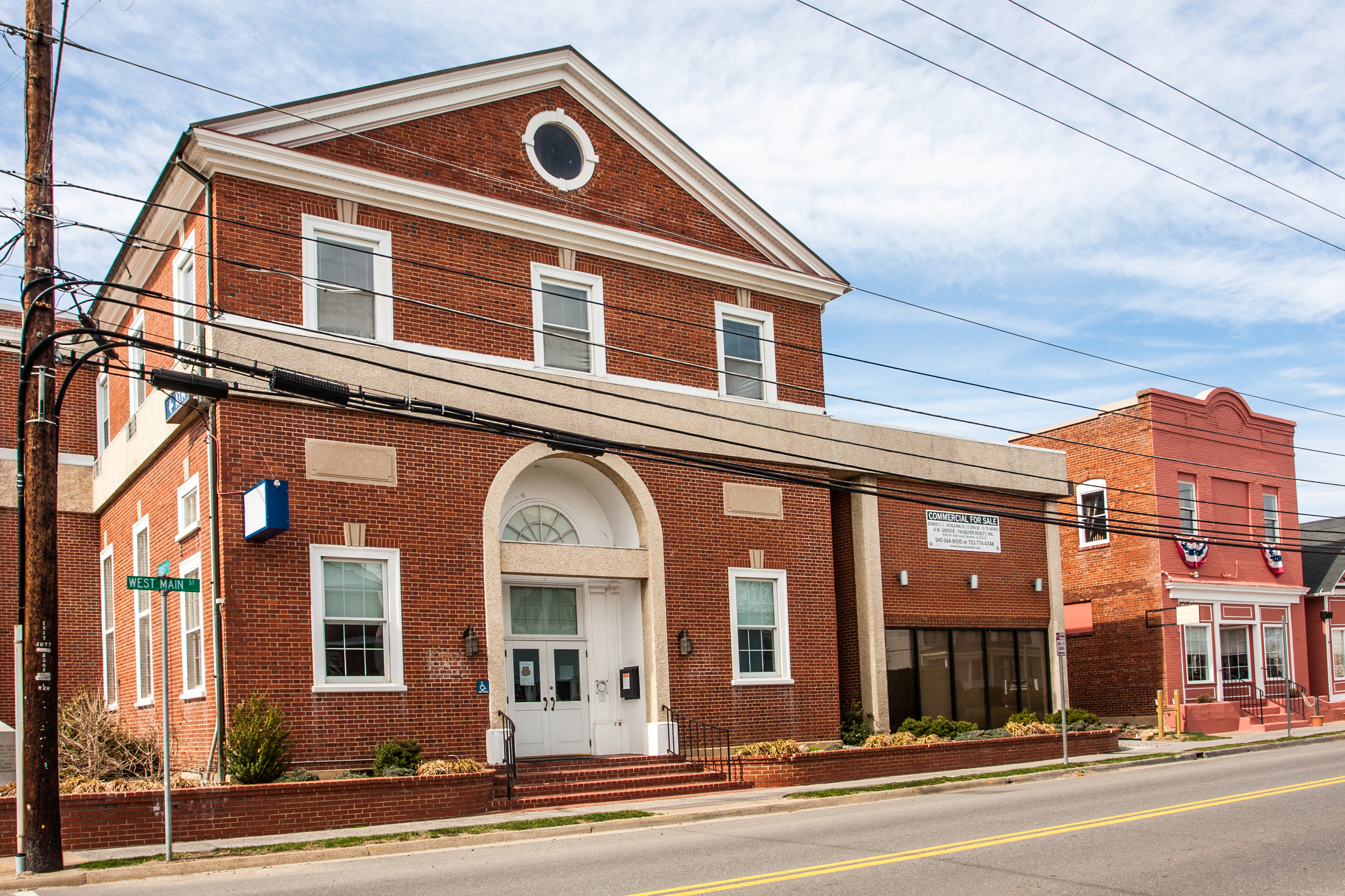
8372 W. Main St.

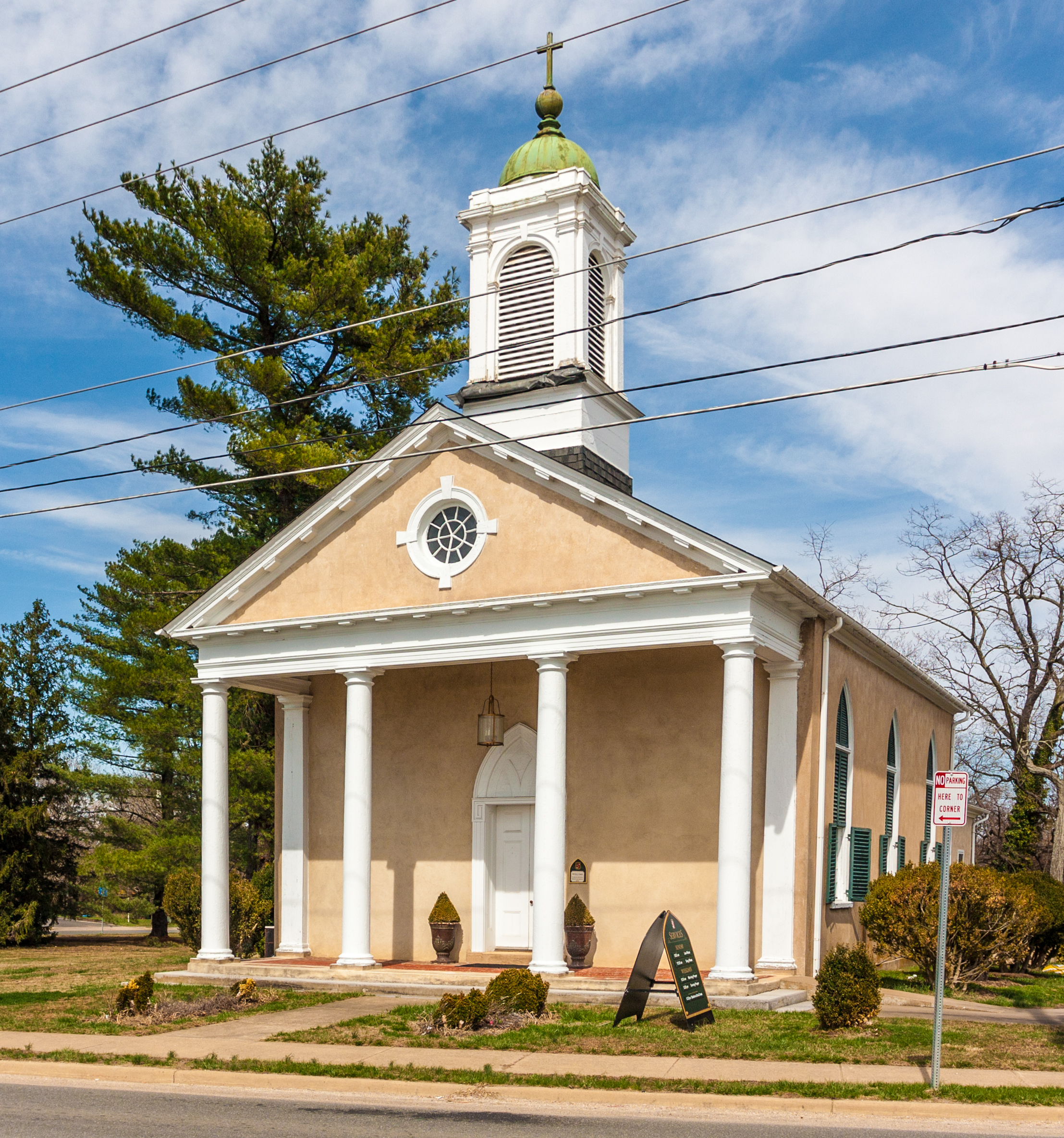
Anglican Church

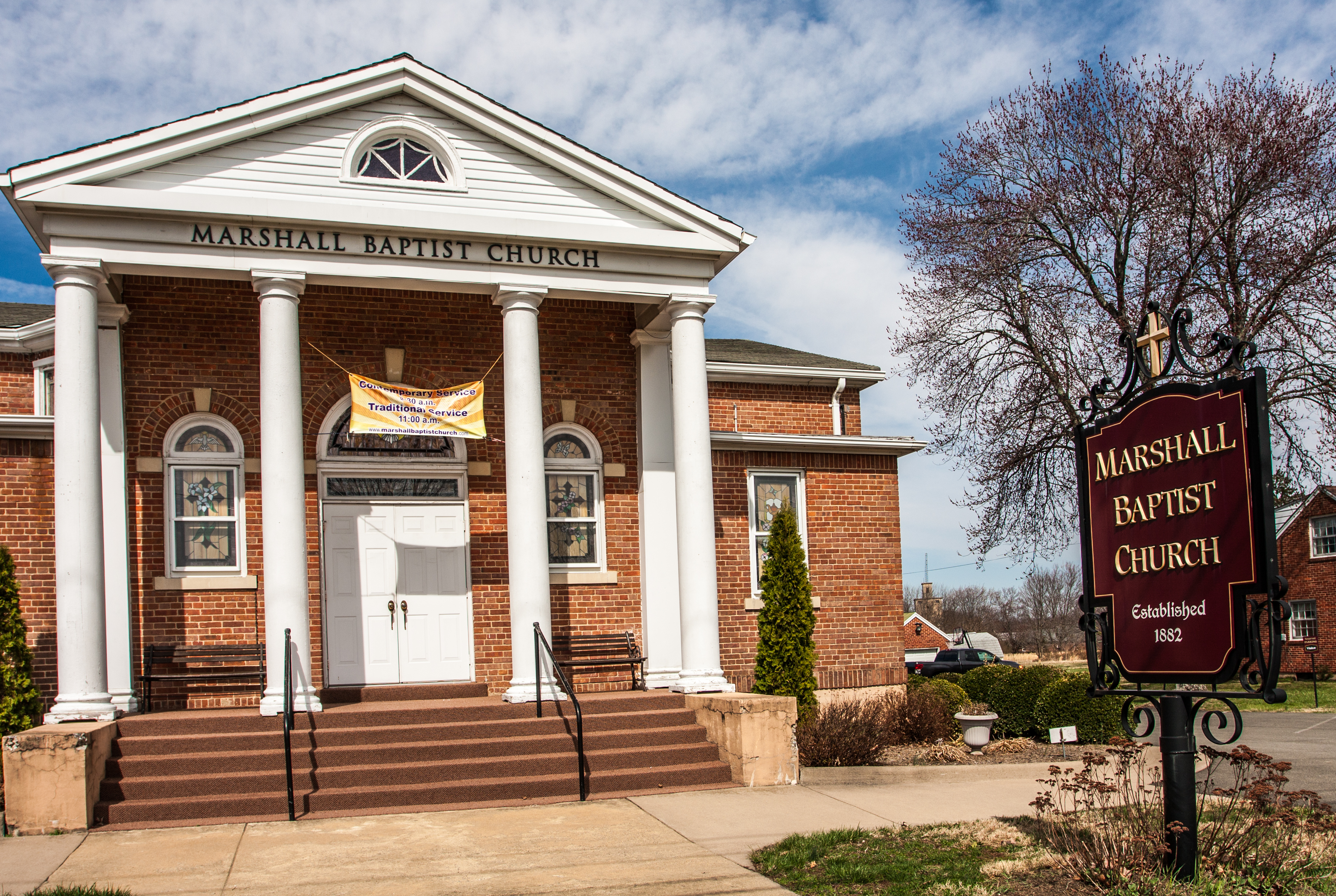
Marshall Baptist Church

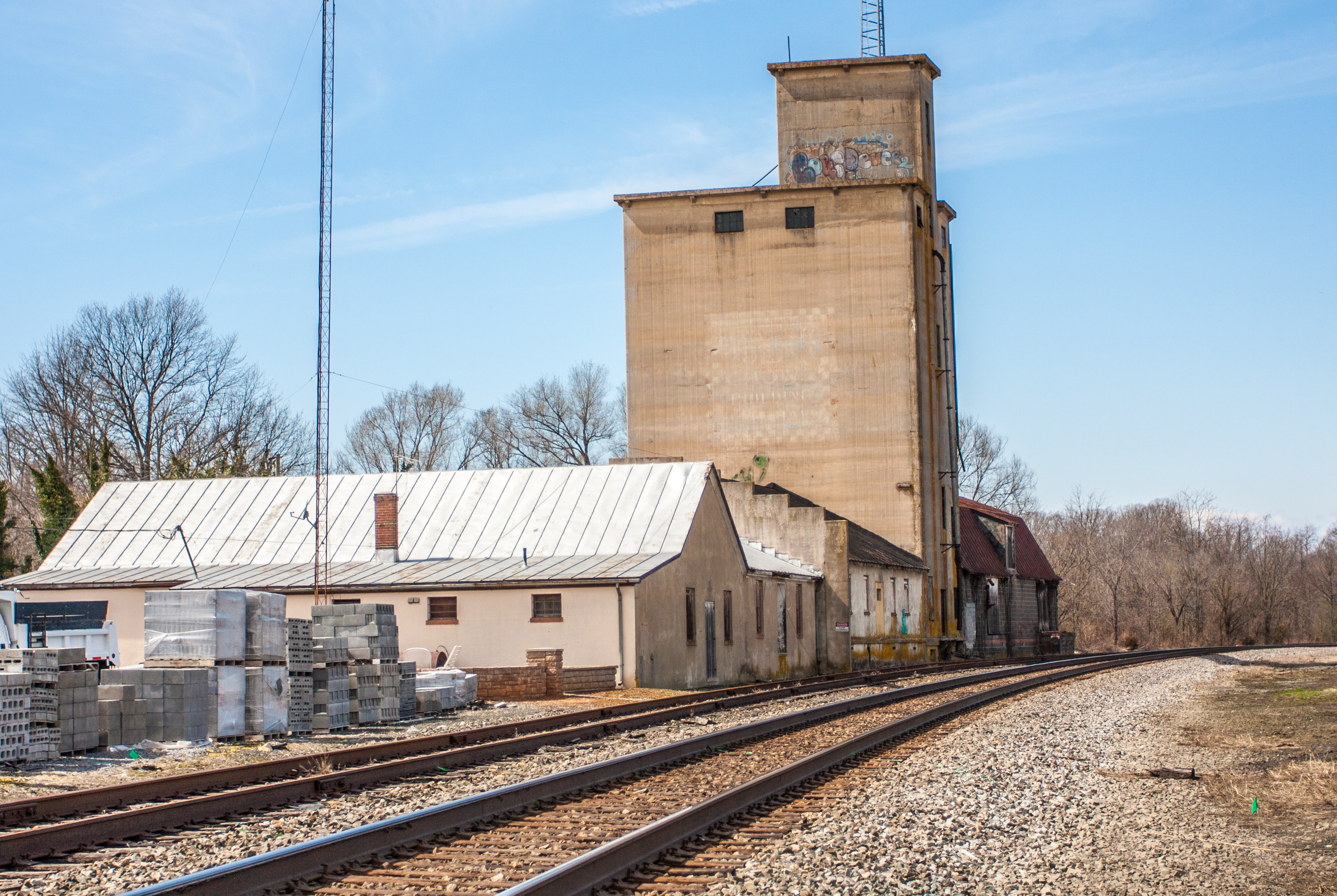
Old Granary, E. Main St.

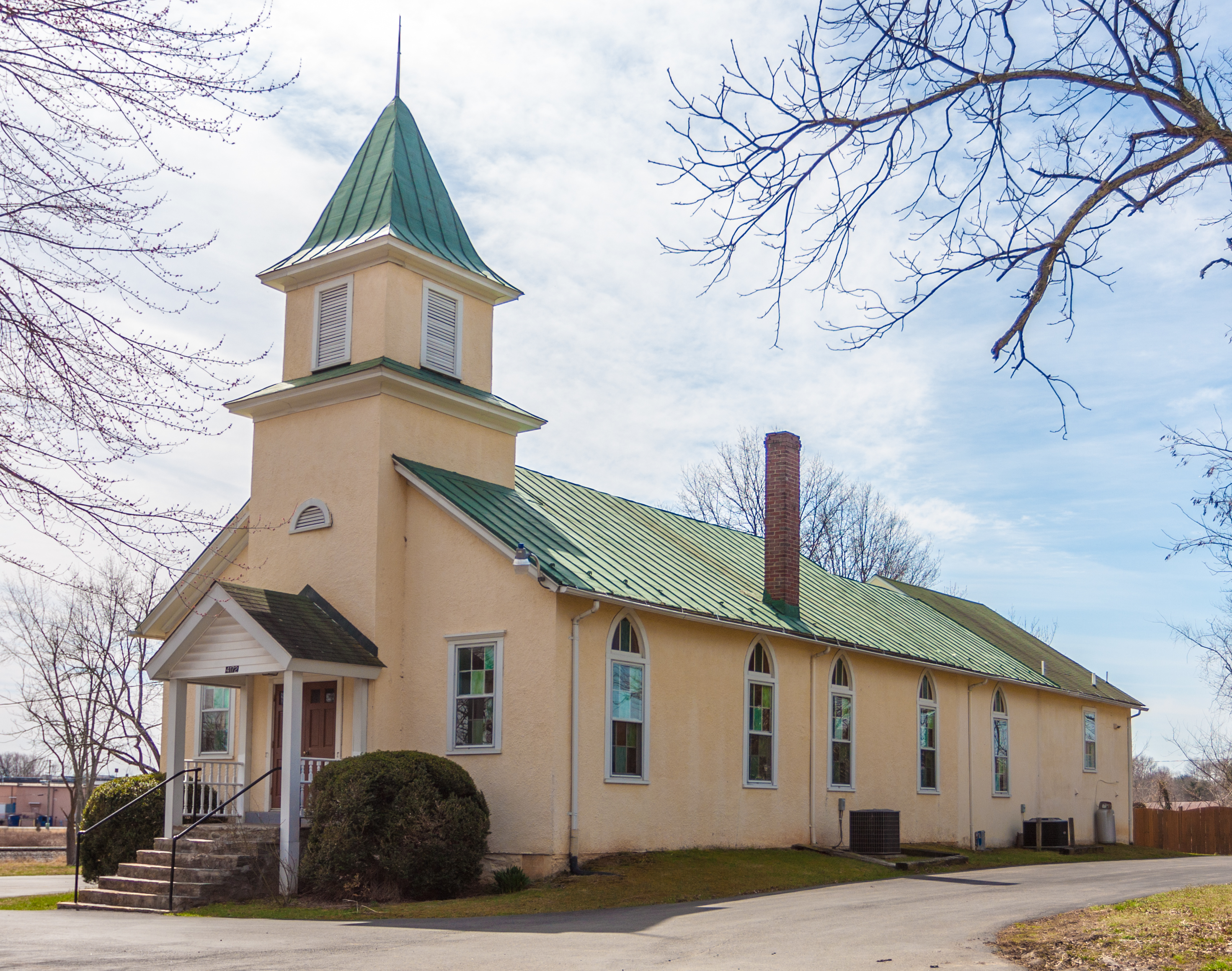
Salem Baptist Church

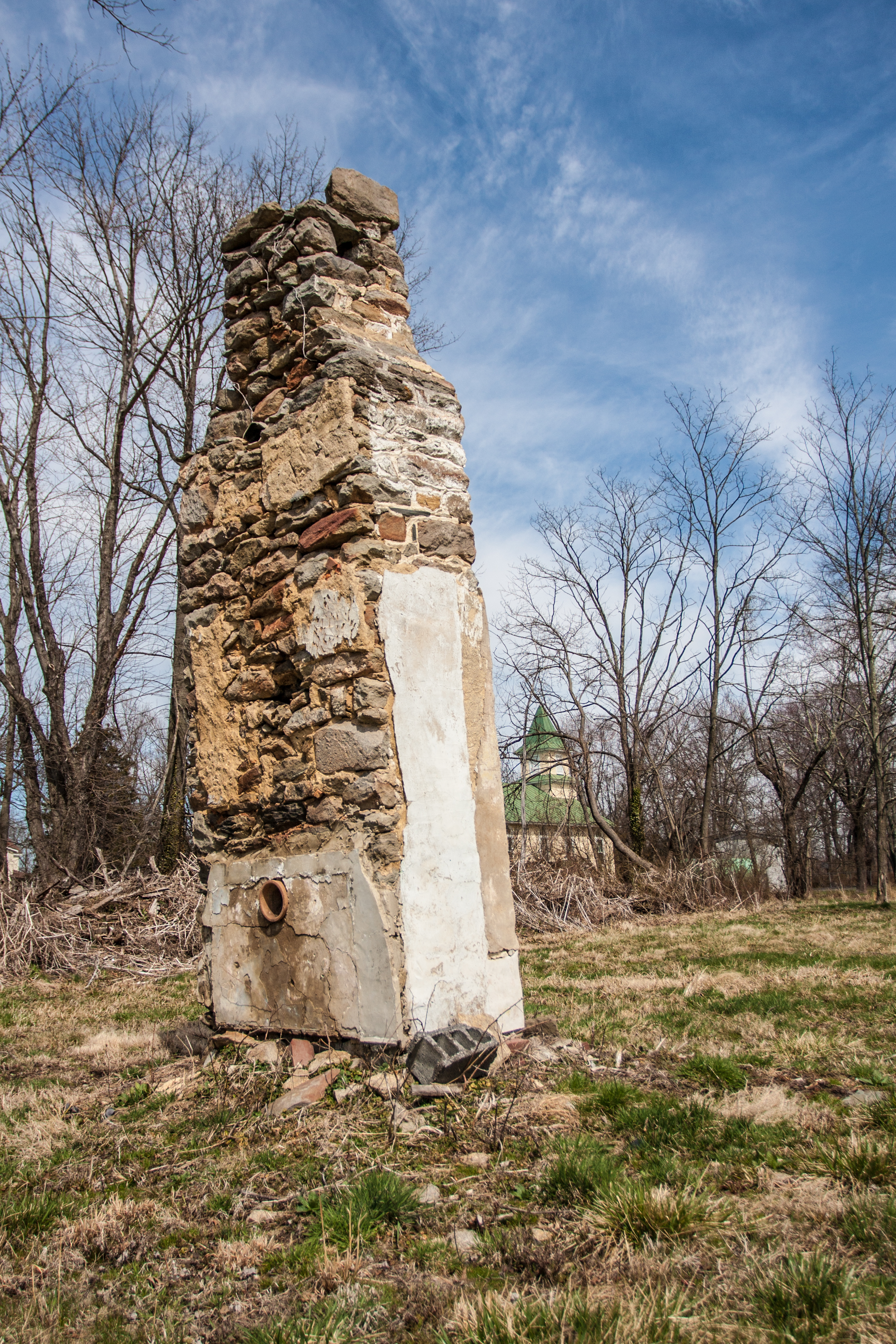
Residential ruins, Rosstown Rd.
