= Mary Willis Library =

Historic library in US state of Georgia

- U.S. National Register of Historic Places
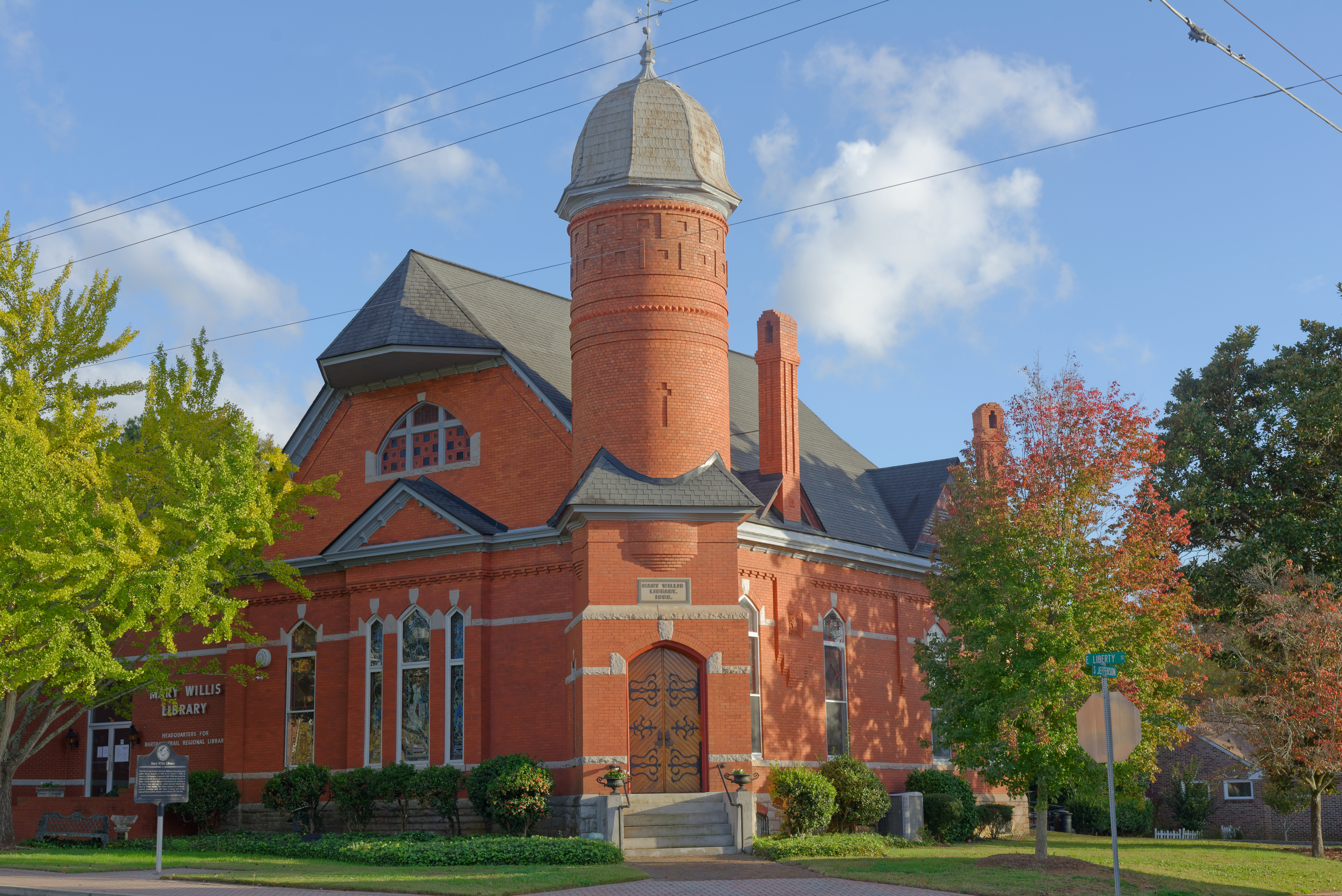
- The Mary Willis Library

- Location within Georgia Location within the United States
- Location: 204 East Liberty Street; Washington, Georgia; United States
- Coordinates: 33°44′7″N 82°44′17″W
- Built: 1888 (Institution founded); 1889 (Library built)
- Architect: Edmund Lind (1889); Later additions by: Kuhlkhe & Wade (1977); Edmund Maddox (1991)
- Architectural style: Queen Anne
- NRHP reference No.: 72000407
- Added to NRHP: April 11, 1972

The Mary Willis Library is a historic public library located in the city of Washington, in the U.S. state of Georgia. The library, located at 204 East Liberty Street (corner of East Liberty and South Jefferson) in downtown Washington, is the designated public library for Wilkes County and headquarters of the Bartram Trail Regional Library System. Built in 1889 in red brick and featuring Tiffany glass, the Mary Willis Library was listed with the U.S. National Register of Historic Places on April 11, 1972.

== First free library ==
The Mary Willis Library was the first free public library in the state of Georgia when it opened in 1889. The free library was a revolutionary concept in a day when all the state's earlier libraries charged users a subscription fee. The library was founded the previous year by Dr. Francis T. Willis in memory of his daughter, Mary. Dr. Willis, a local by birth who had moved to Richmond, Virginia in 1867, left the library as a gift to his hometown and its citizens. Dr. Willis donated his own private collection of books, plus $15,000 for the library's construction, $2,000 to purchase furnishings and more books, and another $10,000 as an endowment fund.

Noted Atlanta architect Edmund George Lind designed the library in the Queen Anne style, with masonry construction featuring detailed brickwork, a steeply gabled roof and a dome-capped tower. The library interior is lit by stained glass windows, including the central memorial window which was crafted by Tiffany Studios. The historic original 1889 construction covered a size of 2,655 ft^{2} (246.7 m^{2}).

By 1977, the facility had outgrown its original space, and an addition was needed. Architects Kuhlkhe and Wade of Augusta designed an annex which was attached to Lind's historic original structure. This first annex added 4,459 ft^{2} (414.3 m^{2}) of floor space. A second, even larger addition of 5,267 ft^{2} (489.3 m^{2}) was completed in 1991, designed by architect Edmund Maddox of Savannah. Today's facility, at 12,381 ft^{2} (1150.2 m^{2}) is over four and a half times the size of the original.

The collection at Mary Willis Library includes at its core a number of rare books on local and state history, books by authors native to the Washington-Wilkes County area, genealogical archives, and historic memorabilia and newspapers from Washington's past.

== Regional library ==
The library's private endowment continued to fund operations until 1967, when Mary Willis Library joined with the library in neighboring Taliaferro County to form a regional library system. Today, the Bartram Trail Regional Library System is headquartered at Mary Willis Library. The Bartram Trail system services Wilkes County, where Mary Willis Library is located, Taliaferro County, and McDuffie County. Mary Willis is joined in the Bartram Trail system by two branch libraries, the Taliaferro County Library in Crawfordville and the Thomson-McDuffie County Library in Thomson.

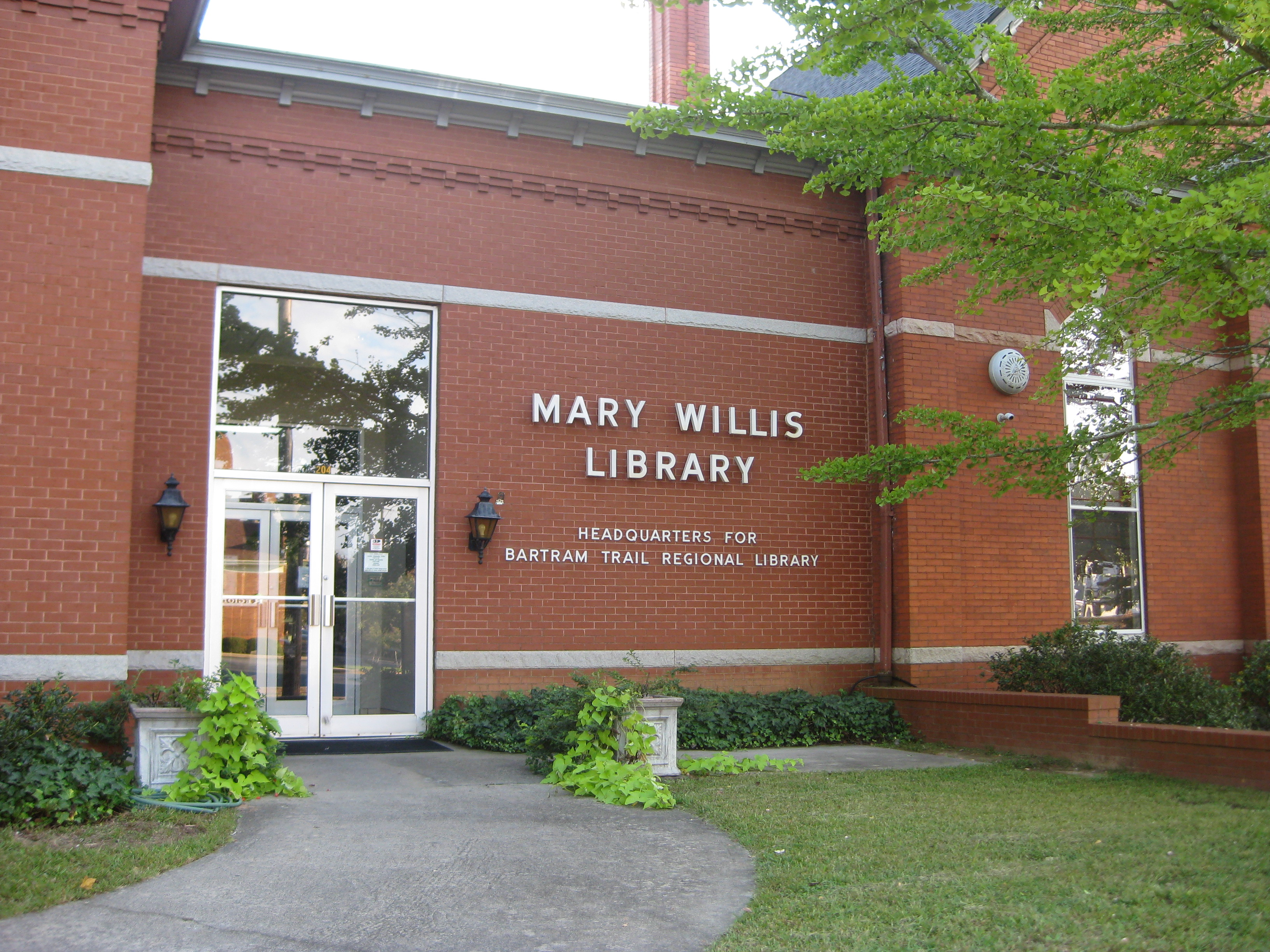
Entrance to the library annex

== See also ==
- National Register of Historic Places listings in Wilkes County, Georgia
