= Bolton Street =

Bolton Street may refer to:

- Bolton Street, London, England, United Kingdom
- Bolton Street, Dublin, Ireland
