= Marshall, Virginia =

- Census-designated place
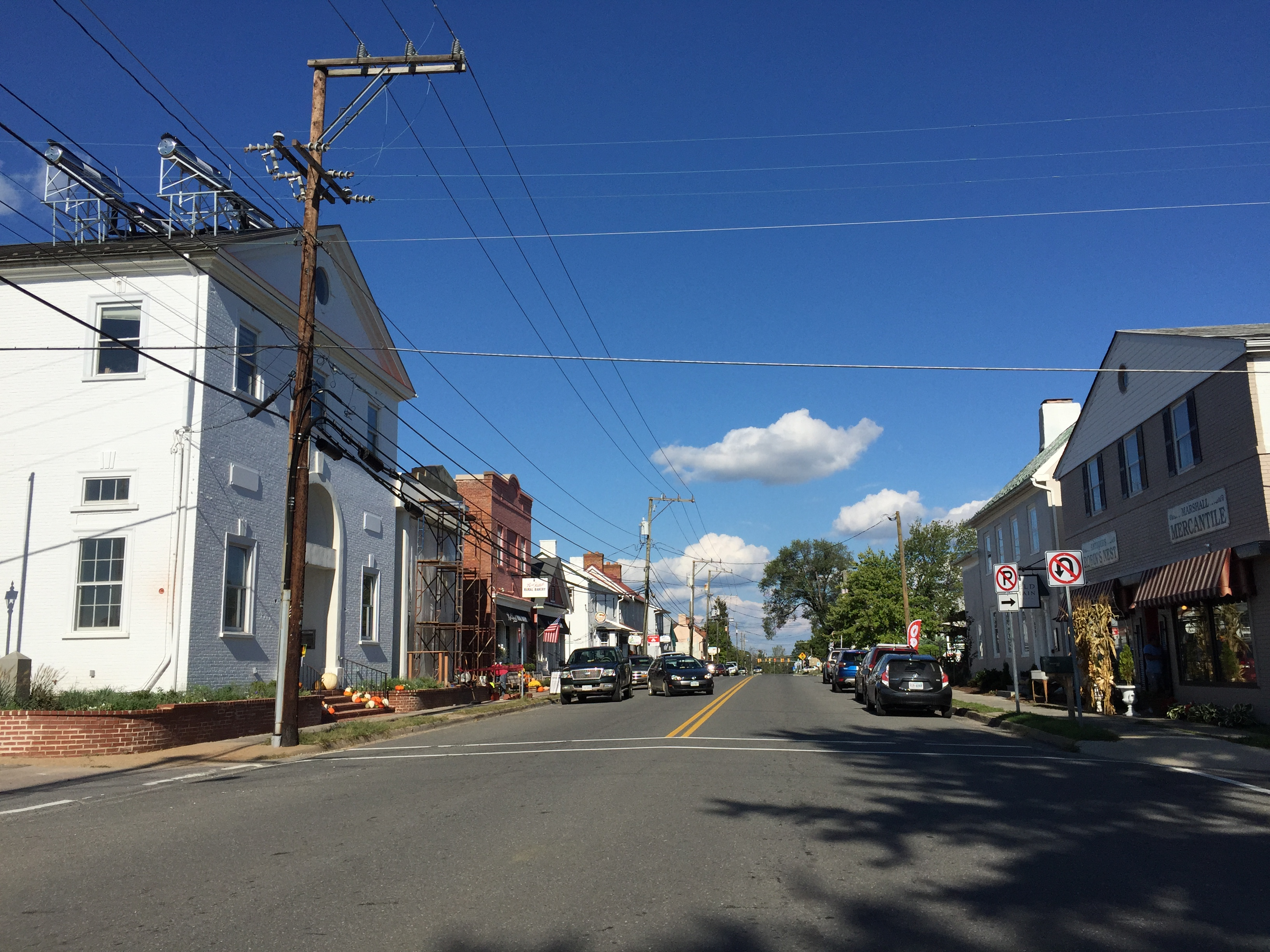
- Main Street in Marshall

- Location within Northern Virginia Location within Virginia Location within the United States
- Coordinates: 38°51′53″N 77°51′28″W
- Country: United States
- State: Virginia
- County: Fauquier

Area
  - Total: 2.89 sq mi (7.49 km^{2})
  - Land: 2.88 sq mi (7.47 km^{2})
  - Water: 0.0077 sq mi (0.02 km^{2})
- Elevation: 685 ft (209 m)

Population (2010)
  - Total: 1,480
  - Density: 513/sq mi (198.1/km^{2})
- Time zone: UTC−5 (Eastern (EST))
  - Summer (DST): UTC−4 (EDT)
- ZIP code: 20115
- FIPS code: 51-49656
- GNIS feature ID: 1495902

Marshall is a census-designated place (CDP) in northwestern Fauquier County, Virginia, United States. The population as of 2024 was 3,292.

== History ==
Marshall was originally known as "Salem". It became Marshall after a short-lived incorporation. It is named after John Marshall, the former United States Supreme Court Chief Justice who grew up at Oak Hill in nearby Delaplane.

Marshall is home to the Fauquier Heritage and Preservation Foundation, as well as the Number 18 School in Marshall, which was the last one-room school in Fauquier County. Originally a whites-only schoolhouse, it was a blacks-only schoolhouse until it closed in the 1960s as a result of desegregation. It has been restored, and school groups often visit.

The Ashville Historic District, Marshall Historic District, Morgantown Historic District, Number 18 School in Marshall, and Waveland are listed on the National Register of Historic Places.

== Geography ==
Marshall is centered along State Route 55 between two exits on Interstate 66. Via I-66 it is 50 miles (80 km) east to Washington, D.C., and 20 miles (32 km) west to Front Royal. U.S. Route 17 runs south from Marshall 12 miles (19 km) to Warrenton, the Fauquier County seat.

According to the U.S. Census Bureau, the Marshall CDP has a total area of 2.9 square miles (7.5 km^{2}), of which 0.01 square miles (0.02 km^{2}), or 0.23%, is water. The community sits on a low watershed divide: the north and west sides of town drain north toward Goose Creek, a tributary of the Potomac River, while the south side drains south via Carter Run to the Rappahannock River.

Although Marshall has historically been an agricultural community, its designation as one of nine service districts within Fauquier County, and the only one in northern Fauquier County, has resulted in a unique set of business and professional service offerings to the mostly equestrian and agricultural interests in the surrounding region.

== Demographics ==
Historical population
Census	Pop.	Note	%±
2010	1,480		—
2020	1,854		25.3%
2024 (est.)	3,292		77.6%
U.S. Decennial Census; 2010 2020

=== 2020 census ===
As of the 2020 census, Marshall had a population of 1,854. The median age was 34.5 years. 26.3% of residents were under the age of 18 and 11.3% of residents were 65 years of age or older. For every 100 females there were 97.4 males, and for every 100 females age 18 and over there were 90.7 males age 18 and over.

0.0% of residents lived in urban areas, while 100.0% lived in rural areas.

There were 645 households in Marshall, of which 33.8% had children under the age of 18 living in them. Of all households, 49.1% were married-couple households, 17.5% were households with a male householder and no spouse or partner present, and 26.5% were households with a female householder and no spouse or partner present. About 25.6% of all households were made up of individuals and 12.4% had someone living alone who was 65 years of age or older.

There were 683 housing units, of which 5.6% were vacant. The homeowner vacancy rate was 2.0% and the rental vacancy rate was 5.0%.

Racial composition as of the 2020 census
Race	Number	Percent
White	1,112	60.0%
Black or African American	185	10.0%
American Indian and Alaska Native	15	0.8%
Asian	11	0.6%
Native Hawaiian and Other Pacific Islander	0	0.0%
Some other race	233	12.6%
Two or more races	298	16.1%
Hispanic or Latino (of any race)	519	28.0%

=== 2010 census ===
Marshall was first listed as a census designated place in the 2010 U.S. census.

== Notable people ==
- Thomas N. Frost (died 1969), member of the Virginia House of Delegates
- Blake Corum (b. 2000), NFL player

== See also ==
- Fresta Valley Christian School
