= 1815 =

1815 in various calendars
- Gregorian calendar: 1815; MDCCCXV
- Ab urbe condita: 2568
- Armenian calendar: 1264; ԹՎ ՌՄԿԴ
- Assyrian calendar: 6565
- Balinese saka calendar: 1736–1737
- Bengali calendar: 1221–1222
- Berber calendar: 2765
- British Regnal year: 55 Geo. 3 – 56 Geo. 3
- Buddhist calendar: 2359
- Burmese calendar: 1177
- Byzantine calendar: 7323–7324
- Chinese calendar: 甲戌年 (Wood Dog); 4512 or 4305 — to — 乙亥年 (Wood Pig); 4513 or 4306
- Coptic calendar: 1531–1532
- Discordian calendar: 2981
- Ethiopian calendar: 1807–1808
- Hebrew calendar: 5575–5576
- Hindu calendars
- Vikram Samvat: 1871–1872
- Shaka Samvat: 1736–1737
- Kali Yuga: 4915–4916
- Holocene calendar: 11815
- Igbo calendar: 815–816
- Iranian calendar: 1193–1194
- Islamic calendar: 1230–1231
- Japanese calendar: Bunka 12 (文化１２年)
- Javanese calendar: 1741–1742
- Julian calendar: Gregorian minus 12 days
- Korean calendar: 4148
- Minguo calendar: 97 before ROC 民前97年
- Nanakshahi calendar: 347
- Thai solar calendar: 2357–2358
- Tibetan calendar: ཤིང་ཕོ་ཁྱི་ལོ་ (male Wood-Dog); 1941 or 1560 or 788 — to — ཤིང་མོ་ཕག་ལོ་ (female Wood-Boar); 1942 or 1561 or 789

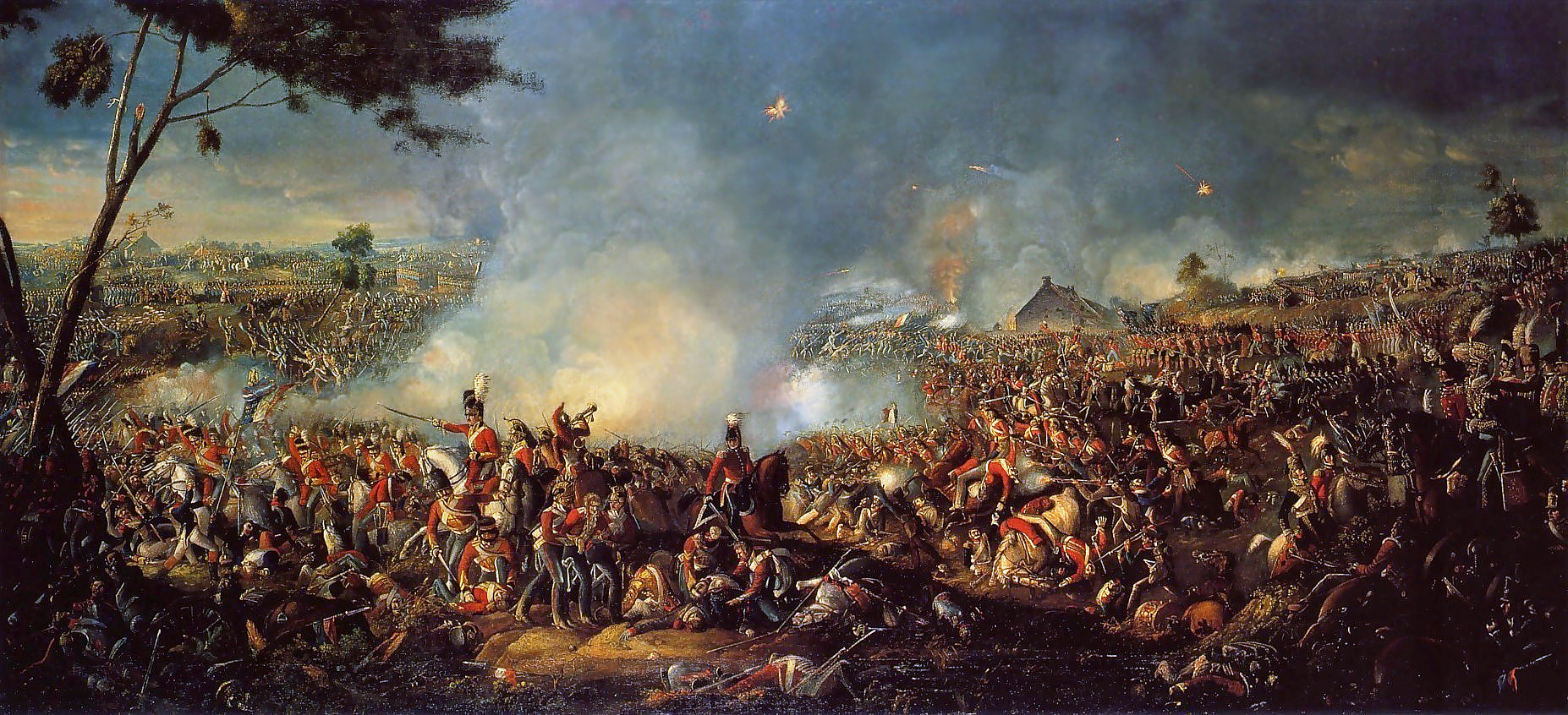
June 18: Emperor of the French Napoleon defeated by Blücher and Wellington at the Battle of Waterloo, bringing an end to the "Hundred Days" crisis after Napoleon's escape from Elba

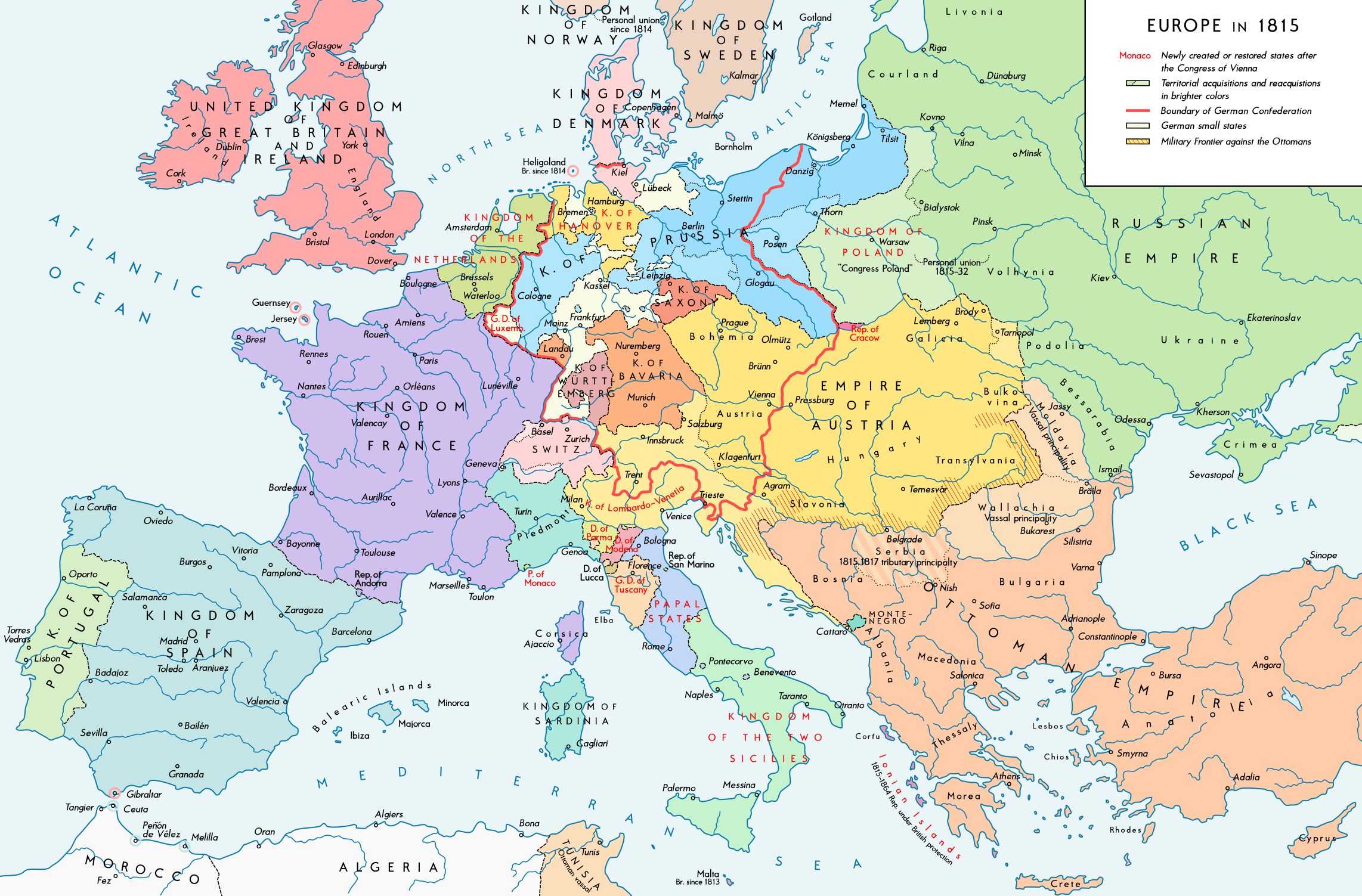
June 19: Congress of Vienna redraws boundaries of the European nations.

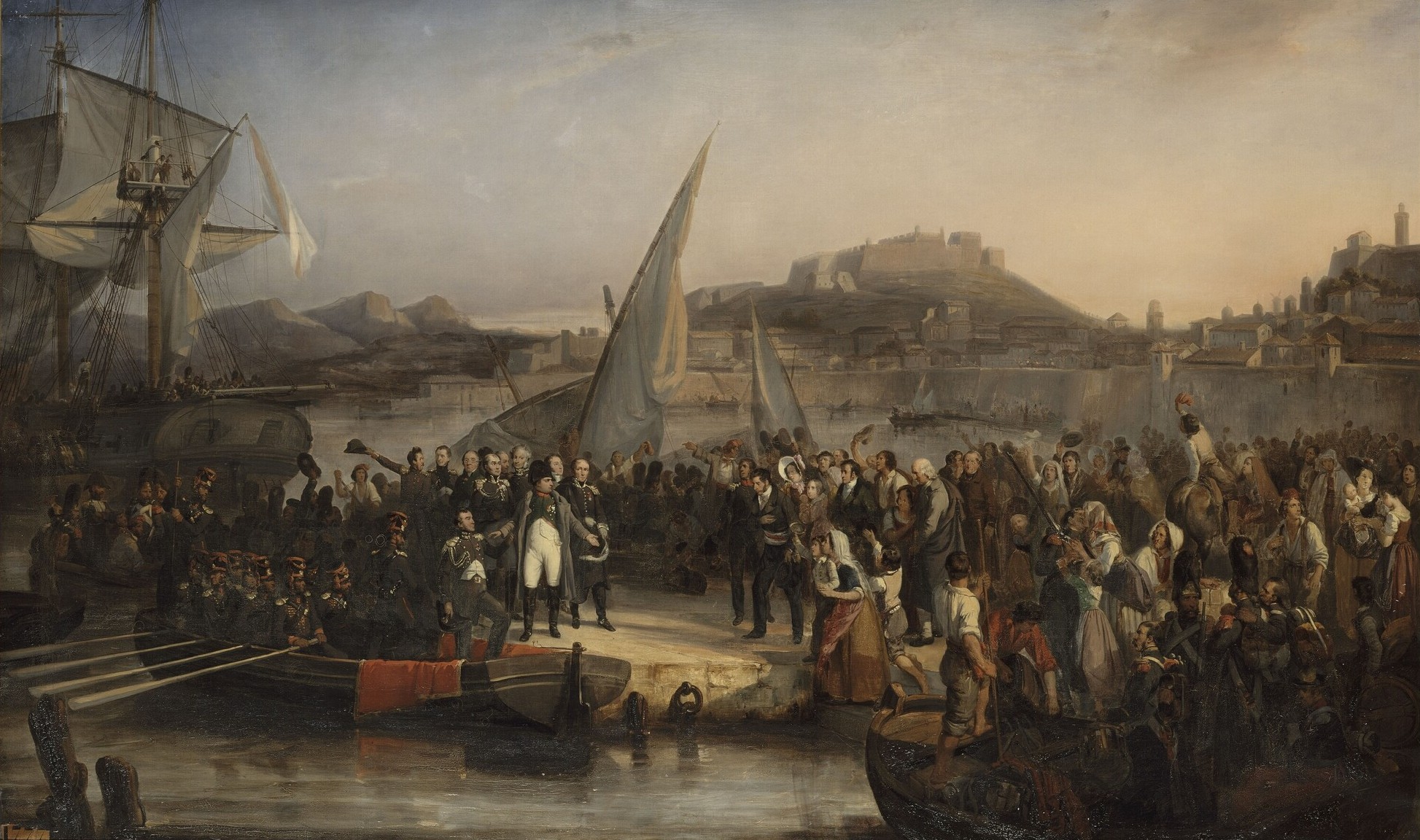
February 26: Napoleon Bonaparte escapes from Elba.

1815 (MDCCCXV) was a common year starting on Sunday of the Gregorian calendar and a common year starting on Friday of the Julian calendar, the 1815th year of the Common Era (CE) and Anno Domini (AD) designations, the 815th year of the 2nd millennium, the 15th year of the 19th century, and the 6th year of the 1810s decade. As of the start of 1815, the Gregorian calendar was 12 days ahead of the Julian calendar, which remained in localized use until 1923.

== Events ==
=== January ===
- January 2 – Lord Byron marries Anna Isabella Milbanke in Seaham, county of Durham, England.
- January 3 – Austria, Britain, and Bourbon-restored France form a secret defensive alliance treaty against Prussia and Russia.
- January 8 – Battle of New Orleans: American forces led by Andrew Jackson defeat British forces led by Sir Edward Pakenham. American forces suffer around 60 casualties and the British lose about 2,000 (the battle lasts for about 30 minutes).
- January 13 – War of 1812: British troops capture Fort Peter in St. Marys, Georgia, the only battle of the war to take place in the state.
- January 15 – War of 1812: Capture of USS President – American frigate USS President (1800), commanded by Commodore Stephen Decatur, is captured by a squadron of four British frigates.

=== February ===
- February 3 – The first commercial cheese factory is founded in Switzerland.
- February 6 – New Jersey grants the first American railroad charter to John Stevens.
- February 17 – The Spanish reconquest of Spanish America begins.
- February 18 – The War of 1812 between the United States and the United Kingdom (including Canada) officially ends, following ratification of the Treaty of Ghent (1814) in Washington, D.C.
- February 26 – Napoleonic Wars: Napoleon escapes from Elba.

=== March ===
- March 1
  - Napoleonic Wars: Napoleon returns to France from his banishment on Elba.
  - Georgetown University's congressional charter is signed into law, by President James Madison.
- March 13 – Participants at the Congress of Vienna declare Napoleon an outlaw following his escape from Elba
- March 15 – Joachim Murat, King of Naples, declares war on Austria in an attempt to save his throne, starting the Neapolitan War.
- March 16 – William I becomes King of the Netherlands.
- March 2–18 – Sri Vikrama Rajasinha of Kandy, the last king in Ceylon, is deposed under the terms of the Kandyan Convention, which results in Ceylon becoming a British colony.
- March 20 – Napoleonic Wars: Napoleon enters Paris, after escaping from Elba with a regular army of 140,000 and a volunteer force of around 200,000, beginning his Hundred Days rule.

=== April ===
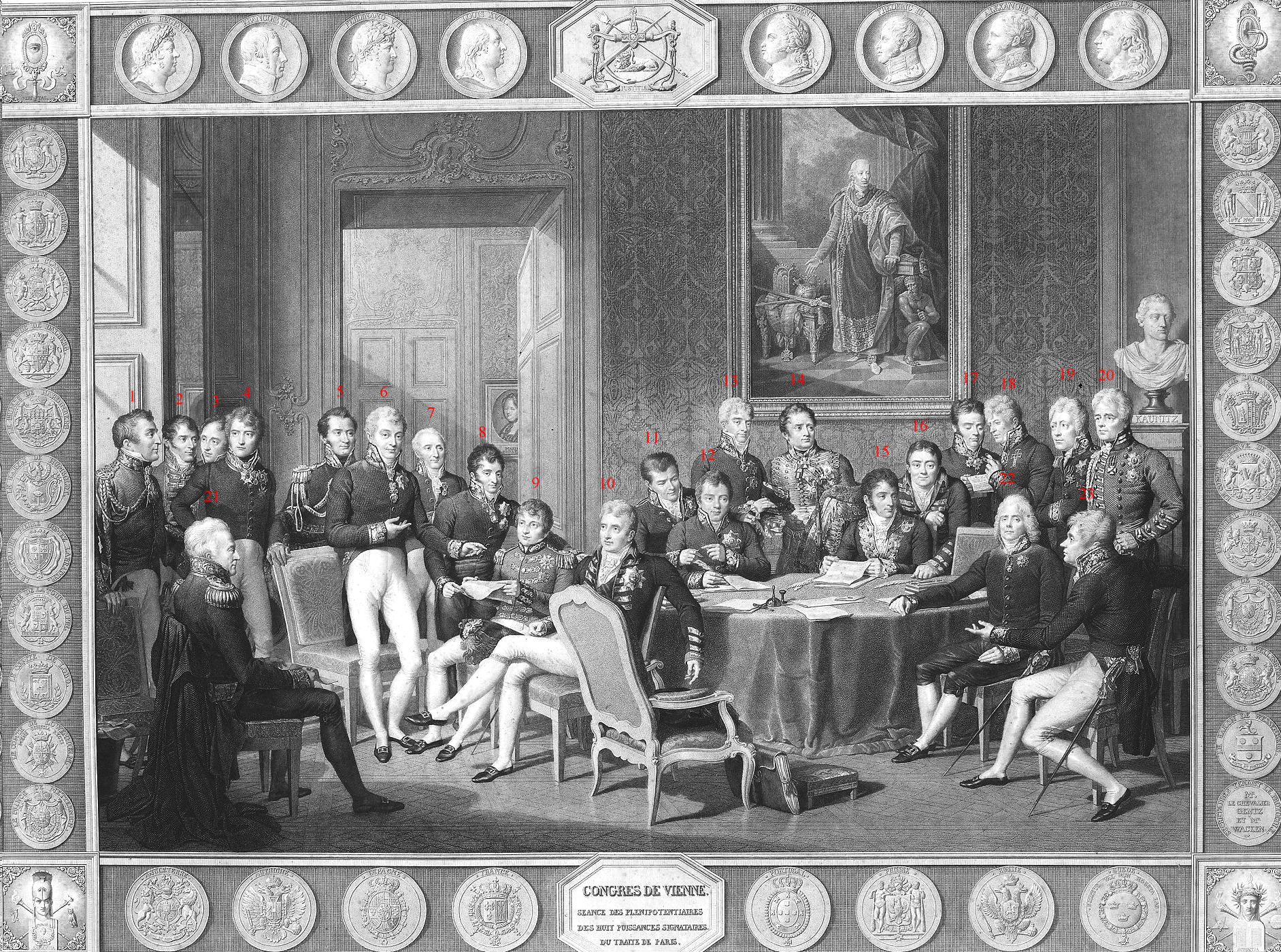
June 9: The Final Act of the Congress of Vienna is signed.

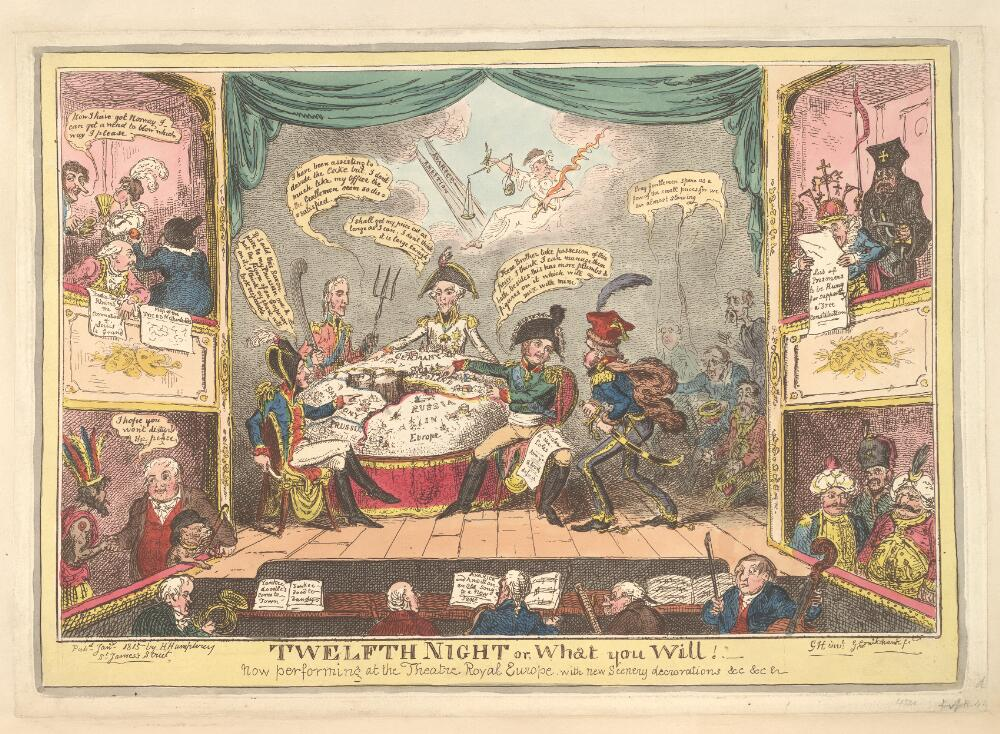
Twelfth Night. Caricature of the Congress of Vienna by George Cruikshank.

- April 10– Mount Tambora in the Dutch East Indies blows its top explosively during its peak eruption, killing more than 92,000 people during week of activity from April 5 to April 12. The blast propels thousands of tons of aerosols (Sulfide gas compounds) into the stratosphere, and the high level gases reflect sunlight, causing widespread cooling from a volcanic winter. During 1816, heavy rains fall arounde the world, snow falls in June and July in the Northern Hemisphere, crops fail and widespread famine occurs. In later years, 1816 will become known as the Year Without a Summer.
- April 21 – In India, the eastern part of the former Garhwal Kingdom is joined with Kumaon division, under the administration of the British Raj.
- April 24 – The Second Serbian Uprising against Ottoman rule takes place in Takovo, Ottoman Serbia. By the end of the year Serbia is acknowledged as a semi-independent state, temporarily achieving the ideals of the First Serbian Uprising.

=== May ===
- May 3 – Battle of Tolentino: Austria defeats the Kingdom of Naples, which quickly ends the Neapolitan War. Joachim Murat, the defeated King of Naples, is forced to flee to Corsica, and is later executed.
- May 30 – The Arniston, an East Indiaman ship repatriating wounded troops to England from Ceylon, is wrecked near Waenhuiskrans, South Africa, with the loss of 372 of the 378 people on board.

=== June ===
- June 9 – The Final Act of the Congress of Vienna is signed: A new European political situation is set. The German Confederation and Congress Poland are created, and the neutrality of Switzerland is guaranteed. Also, Luxembourg declares independence from the French Empire.
- June 15 – The Duchess of Richmond's ball is held in Brussels, "the most famous ball in history".
- June 16 – Napoleonic Wars:
  - Battle of Ligny – Napoleon defeats a Prussian army under Gebhard Leberecht von Blücher.
  - Battle of Quatre Bras – Marshal Ney engages Arthur Wellesley, 1st Duke of Wellington, resulting in a tactical and strategic draw.
- June 18 – Napoleonic Wars: Battle of Waterloo – Allied forces led by Arthur Wellesley, 1st Duke of Wellington, and Gebhard Leberecht von Blücher decisively, and this time permanently, defeat Napoleon.
- June 22 – Napoleonic Wars: Napoleon abdicates again; Napoleon II (1811–1832), age 4, nominally rules for two weeks (22 June to 7 July).
- June 26 – Napoleonic Wars: Wellington's advancing Allied Army takes Péronne, Somme, on its way to Paris.

=== July ===
- July 8 – Napoleonic Wars: Louis XVIII returns to Paris, and is 'restored' as King of France (he had declared himself king on 8 June 1795, at the death of his nephew, 10-year-old Louis XVII, and had lived in Westphalia, Verona, Russia, and England).
- July 15 – Napoleonic Wars: Napoleon boards HMS Bellerophon off Rochefort, and surrenders to Captain Frederick Lewis Maitland of the Royal Navy.

=== August ===
- August 2 – Napoleonic Wars: Representatives of the United Kingdom, Austria, Russia and Prussia sign a convention at Paris, declaring that Napoleon Bonaparte is "their prisoner" and that "His safe keeping is entrusted to the British Government."
- August 7 – Napoleonic Wars: Napoleon is transferred to HMS Northumberland, to begin his forced and final second exile, on the remote island of Saint Helena in the South Atlantic Ocean.

=== September ===
- September 23 – The Great September Gale of 1815 is the first hurricane to strike New England in 180 years.
- September 26 – Austria, Prussia and Russia sign a Holy Alliance, to uphold the European status quo.

=== October ===
- October – Robert Adams, American sailor and the first Westerner to visit Timbuktu, is found wandering the streets of London, starving and half-naked, leading to the invitation for him to tell his story as a Barbary captive, which is later published as The Narrative of Robert Adams.
- October 3 – The Chassigny Martian meteorite falls in Chassigny, Haute-Marne, France.
- October 15 – Napoleonic Wars: Napoleon begins his exile on Saint Helena in the Atlantic Ocean.
- October 23 – A 6.8 earthquake shakes northern China causing many houses and caves to collapse, killing at least 13,000 people.

=== November ===
- November 3 – Sir Humphry Davy announces his invention, the Davy lamp (a coal mining safety lamp),
- November 5 – The Ionian Islands become a British protectorate, the United States of the Ionian Islands.
- November 20 – The Napoleonic Wars come to an end after 12 years, with the British government restoring the status quo of France, prior to when the French Revolution began in 1789, after 26 years of turmoil.
- November 27 – The Constitution of the Kingdom of Poland is signed, creating Congress Poland, a constitutional monarchy in personal union with the Russian Empire, under terms agreed at the Congress of Vienna.

=== December ===
- December 7 – Marshal Ney is executed in Paris, near the Jardin du Luxembourg.
- December 23 – The novel Emma by Jane Austen is first published, anonymously in London, dated 1816.
- December 25 – The Handel and Haydn Society, the oldest continuously performing arts organization in the United States, gives its first performance, in Boston.

=== Date unknown ===
- The first full-blooded European native born in New Zealand, Thomas King, is born in the Bay of Islands.
- The second wave of Amish immigration to North America begins.
- In the United Kingdom, use of the pillory is limited to punishment for perjury.
- Wisden Cricketers' Almanack retrospectively recognises statistics for first-class cricket in England from this year.

== Births ==
=== January–June ===
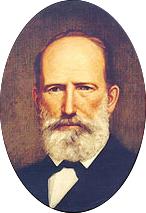
Edward Clark

- January 11 – John A. Macdonald, 1st Prime Minister of Canada, Father of Confederation (d. 1891)
- January 15 – Bertha Wehnert-Beckmann, German photographer (d. 1901)
- January 16 – Henry Halleck, American general (d. 1872)
- January 21 – Horace Wells, American dentist, anesthesia pioneer (d. 1848)
- February 2 – Mathilde Esch, Austrian genre painter (d. 1904)
- February 3 – Edward James Roye, 5th President of Liberia (d. 1872)
- February 10 – Constantin Bosianu, 4th Prime Minister of Romania (d. 1882)
- February 15 – Constantin von Tischendorf, German Biblical scholar (d. 1874)
- March 9 – David Davis, American politician, Associate Justice of the Supreme Court of the United States (d. 1886)
- March 11 – Anna Bochkoltz, German operatic soprano, voice teacher and composer (d. 1879)
- March 12 – Louis-Jules Trochu, French general and politician, 26th Prime Minister of France (d. 1896)
- April 1
  - Otto von Bismarck, German statesman (d. 1898)
  - Edward Clark, Governor of Texas (d. 1880)
- April 6 – Robert Volkmann, German composer (d. 1883)
- April 24 – Anthony Trollope, English novelist (d. 1882)
- May 11 – Richard Ansdell, English painter and engraver (d. 1885)
- May 19 – Thomas Thornycroft, English sculptor and engineer (d. 1885)
- May 27 – Sir Henry Parkes, father of the Australian Federation (d. 1896)
- June 18 – Ludwig Freiherr von und zu der Tann-Rathsamhausen, Bavarian general (d. 1881)
- June 30 – Wilhelm von Ramming, Austrian general (d. 1876)

=== July–December ===
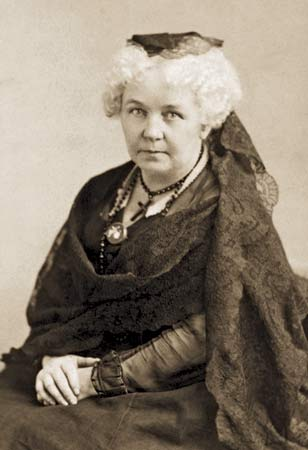
Elizabeth Cady Stanton

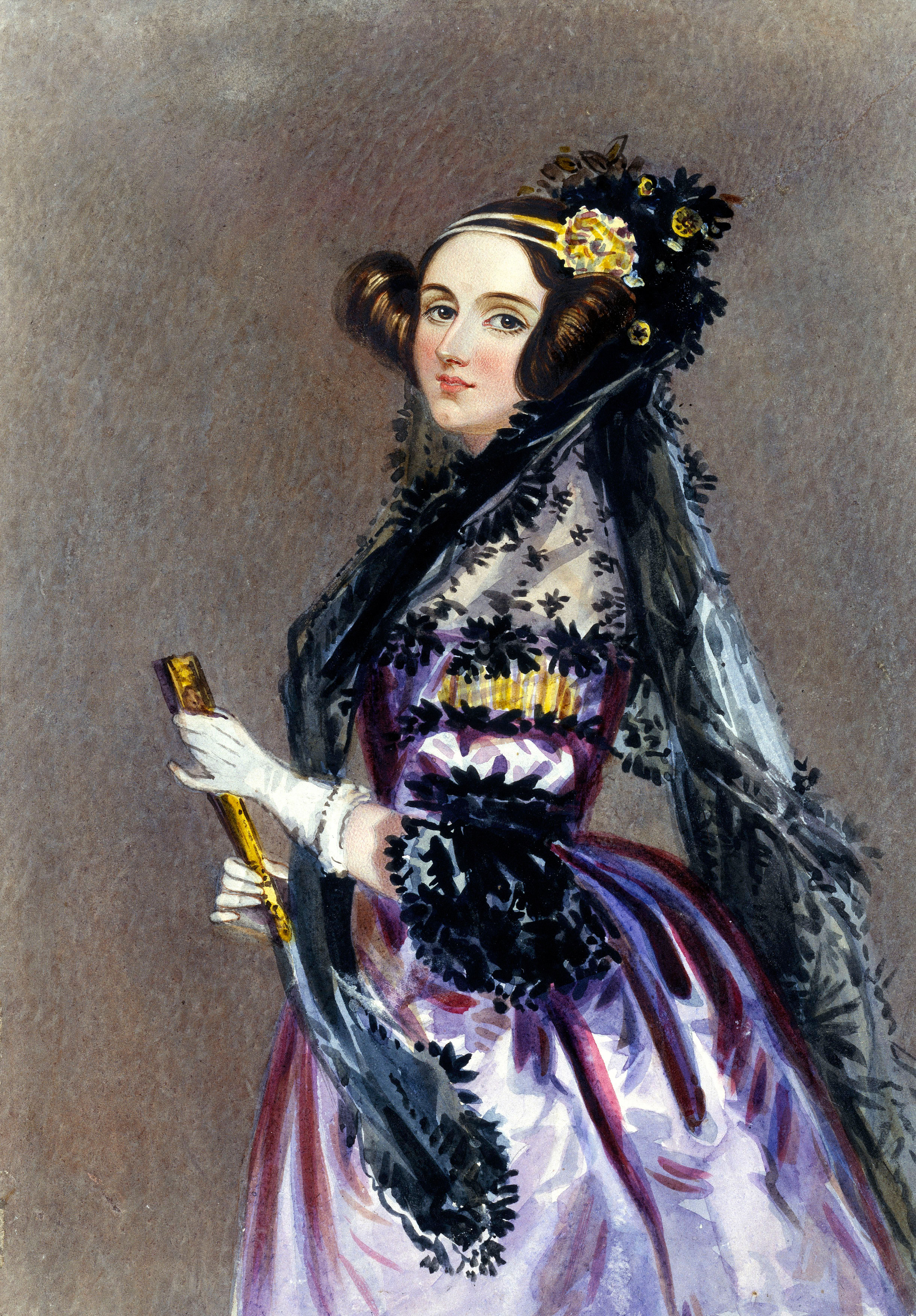
Ada Lovelace

- July 26 – Robert Remak, German embryologist, physiologist and neurologist (d. 1865)
- August 5 – Edward John Eyre, English explorer, colonial governor (d. 1901)
- August 16 – Saint John Bosco, Italian priest, educator (d. 1888)
- August 26 – Bernard Jauréguiberry, French admiral and statesman (d. 1887)
- October 16 – Francis Lubbock, Governor of Texas (d. 1905)
- October 23 – João Maurício Vanderlei, Baron of Cotejipe, Brazilian magistrate, politician (d. 1889)
- October 31 – Karl Weierstrass, German mathematician (d. 1897)
- September 12 – Richard S. Rust, American abolitionist (d. 1906)
- November 2 – George Boole, English mathematician, philosopher (d. 1864)
- November 5 – Luís Carlos Martins Pena, Brazilian playwright (d. 1848)
- November 12 – Elizabeth Cady Stanton, American women's rights activist (d. 1902)
- November 20
  - Maria Cederschiöld, Swedish deaconess (d. 1892)
  - Franz von John, Austrian general and politician (d. 1876)
- December 2 – Juan Javier Espinosa, 9th President of Ecuador (d. 1870)
- December 8 – Adolph Menzel, German painter (d. 1905)
- December 10 – Ada Lovelace, English computer pioneer, daughter of Lord Byron (d. 1852)
- December 13 – Pálné Veres, Hungarian educator, women's rights activist (d. 1895)
- December 21 – Thomas Couture, French painter (d. 1879)
- December 30 – Joseph Toynbee, English otologist (d. 1866)
- December 31 – George Meade, American general (d. 1872)

=== Date unknown ===
- William Farquharson Burnett, British commodore (d. 1863)

== Deaths ==
=== January–June ===
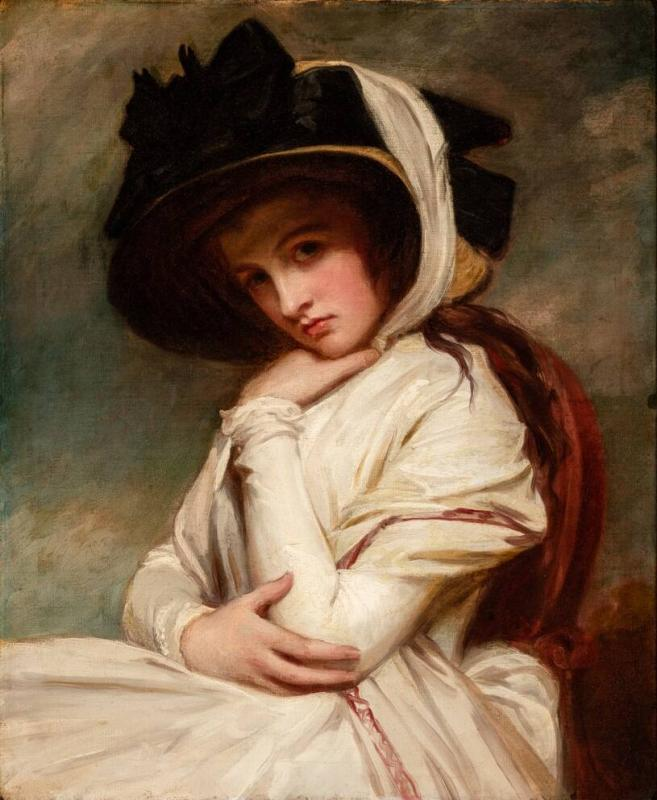
Emma, Lady Hamilton

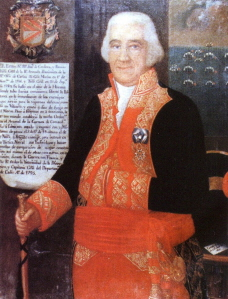
José de Córdoba y Ramos

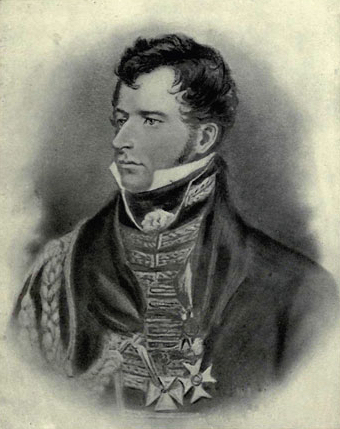
William Howe De Lancey

- January 8 – Edward Pakenham, British general (killed in battle) (b. 1778)
- January 16 – Emma, Lady Hamilton, politically active British courtesan, lover of Horatio Nelson (b. 1765)
- January 24 – Sir Charles Malet, 1st Baronet, British East India Company official (b. 1752)
- February 9 – Ellen Hutchins, Irish botanist (b. 1785)
- February 22 – Smithson Tennant, English chemist, discovered the elements iridium and osmium (b. 1761)
- February 24 – Robert Fulton, American inventor (b. 1765)
- February 26 – Prince Josias of Saxe-Coburg-Saalfeld, Austrian general (b. 1737)
- March 4 – Frances Abington, English actress (b. 1737)
- March 5 – Franz Mesmer, German developer of animal magnetism (b. 1734)
- April 3 – José de Córdoba y Ramos, Spanish explorer and naval commander (b. 1732)
- April 21 – Joseph Winston, American patriot, Congressman from North Carolina (b. 1746)
- May 11 – Aletta Haniel, German business person (b. 1742)
- May 25 – Domenico Puccini, Italian composer (b. 1772)
- June 1 – Louis-Alexandre Berthier, French marshal (b. 1753)
- June 16 – Friedrich Wilhelm, Duke of Brunswick-Wolfenbüttel, German noble, general (killed in battle) (b. 1771)
- June 17 – Louis-Michel Letort de Lorville, French general (b. 1773)
- June 18 (killed at the Battle of Waterloo):
  - Jean-Jacques Desvaux de Saint-Maurice, French general (b. 1775)
  - Guillaume Philibert Duhesme, French general (b. 1766)
  - Sir Alexander Gordon, British staff officer (b. 1786)
  - Claude-Étienne Michel, French general (b. 1772)
  - Sir Thomas Picton, British general (b. 1758)
  - Sir William Ponsonby, British general (b. 1772)
  - Jean Baptiste van Merlen, Dutch-Belgian general (b. 1773)
- June 26 – William Howe De Lancey, British quartermaster-general (mortally wounded at Waterloo) (b. 1778)
- June 27 – Jean-Baptiste Girard, French general (mortally wounded at Ligny) (b. 1775)

=== July–December ===
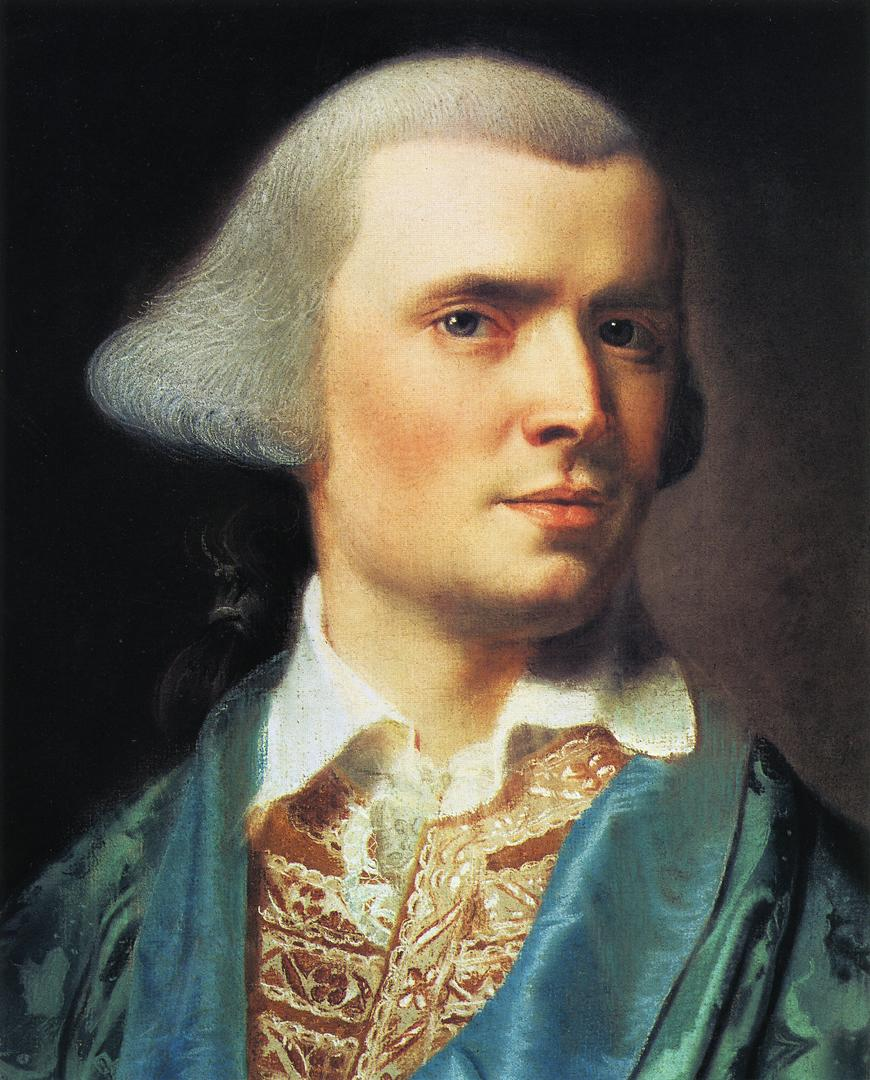
John Singleton Copley

- July 3 – Friedrich Wilhelm von Reden, German pioneer in mining and metallurgy (b. 1752)
- August 2 – Guillaume Marie-Anne Brune, French marshal (murdered) (b. 1763)
- August 6 – James A. Bayard, U.S. Senator from Delaware (b. 1767)
- August 25 – Stephen Badlam, American artisan and military officer (b. 1751)
- September 9 – John Singleton Copley, American painter (b. 1738)
- September 20 – Nicolas Desmarest, French geologist (b. 1725)
- October 13 – Joachim Murat, French marshal, King of Naples (executed) (b. 1767)
- October 19 – Paolo Mascagni, Italian anatomist (b. 1755)
- October 22 – Claude Lecourbe, French general (b. 1759)
- December 3 – John Carroll, first American Roman Catholic Archbishop (b. 1735)
- December 7 – Michel Ney, French marshal (executed) (b. 1769)
- December 8 – Mary Bosanquet Fletcher, English Methodist preacher and philanthropist (b. 1739)
- December 22 – José María Morelos, leader of Mexican War of Independence, executed (b. 1765)
- December 29 – Saartjie Baartman, South African sideshow performer
