= Esmeralda Boyle =

American novelist

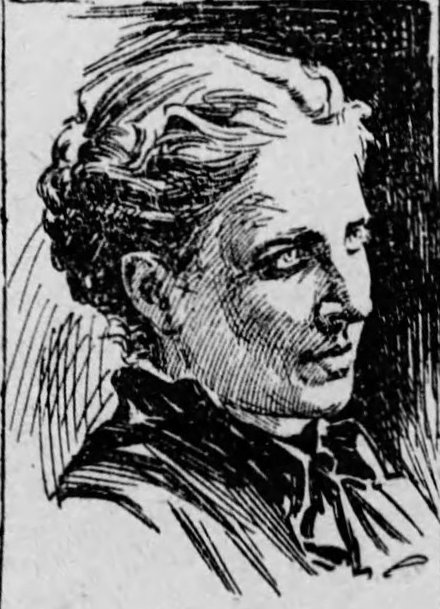
- Born: September 29, 1840
- Died: April 18, 1928 (aged 87)

Esmeralda Boyle (September 29, 1840 – April 18, 1928) was an American author and poet, best known for her book Biographical Sketches of Distinguished Marylanders (1877).

== Life and career ==
Esmeralda Boyle was born on September 29, 1840, in Washington, D.C., one of four daughters and five children of US Navy Commodore Junius Ignatius Boyle. She was born at the Boyle country residence of Shamrock Hill, on the site of the present day Glenwood Cemetery.

Like her parents, Boyle was part of Washington's social elite. Future US President James A. Garfield wrote of her in his diary after meeting her on a social occasion in 1873: "[She] is beautiful, and has published two volumes of poems, which give much promise of future achievements."

In 1874, Boyle founded the Literary Society of Washington - called merely "The Literary" in elite circles - with Olive Risley Seward and Sara Carr Upton. The Society membership drew from the women and men of the Washington elite, including Garfield, and its first meeting was in the back parlor of Boyle's mother's home at 723 21st St NW.

Boyle wrote several volumes of poetry, some biographical works, including the first life story of Francis Scott Key, and pieces for numerous publications, including The Army and Navy Journal, The Galaxy, The Hesperian, The Overland Monthly, Out West, and The St. Louis Magazine. She also wrote a society column in the Washington Capital newspaper.

Boyle never married, but she had been engaged to John Hay.

For the last decade and a half of her life, she lived in Grand Island, Nebraska, near where some of her relations had settled. In Nebraska, she taught French and Spanish and worked in a land office. She died there on April 18, 1928, at the age of 87.

== Bibliography ==
- Thistledown 1871
- The Story of Felice 1872
- Songs of Land and Sea 1875
- The Image Breaker 1875
- Biographical Sketches of Distinguished Marylanders 1877
- Father John McElroy, the Irish Priest 1878
- Saint Cecilia's Gates 1890
- Something About the Letterkins 1900
