= Literary Society of Washington =

American literary and social organization

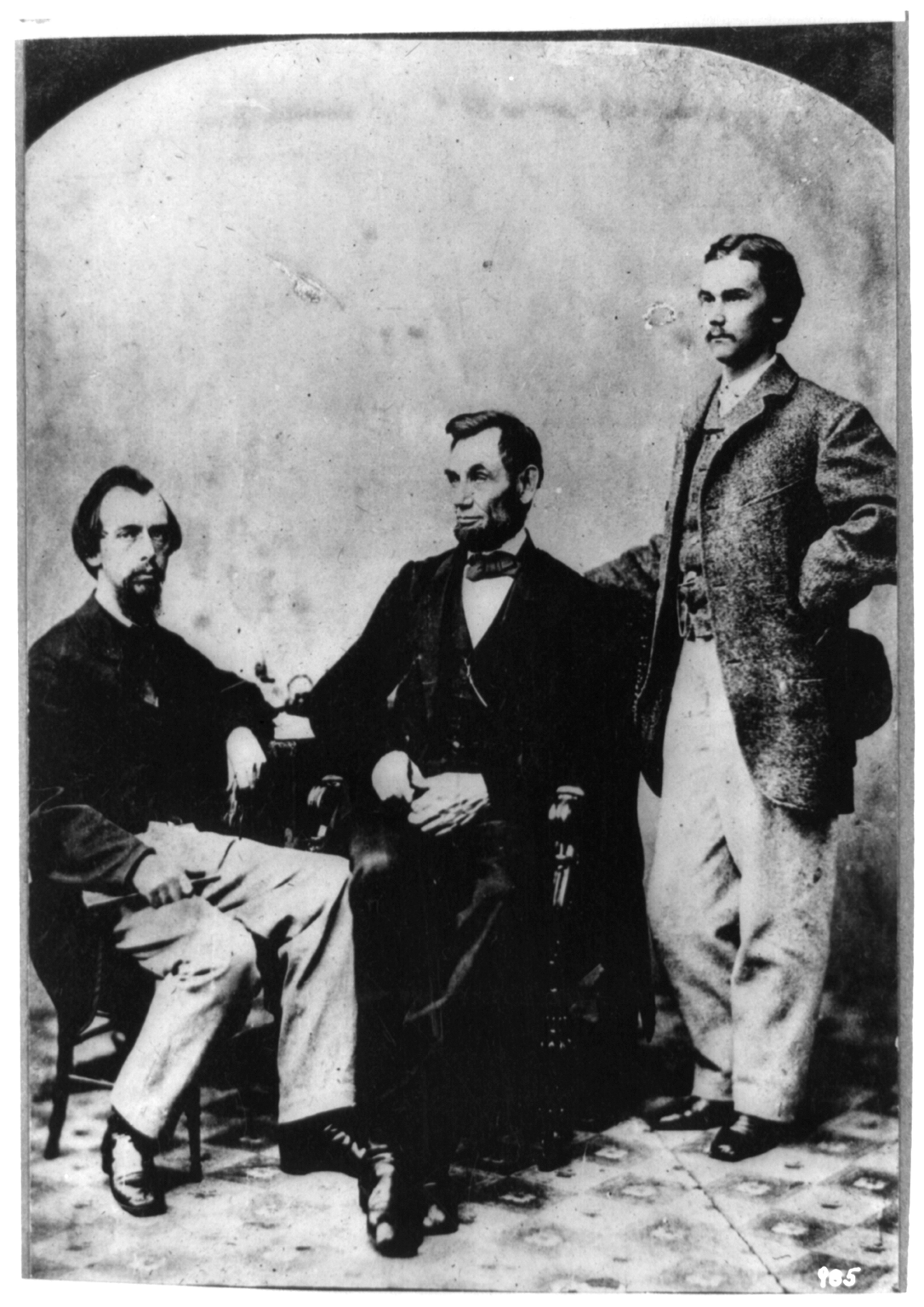
- President Lincoln's closest assistants were his two secretaries John Nicolay (left) and John Hay. Nicolay was one of the founders of the Literary Society in 1874 and a member for 25 years. Hay was a member later while he was Secretary of State in the McKinley and Roosevelt administrations.
- Formation: January 6, 1874; 152 years ago
- Founded at: 723 Twenty-first Street
- Type: Literary society
- Purpose: Literary and artistic improvement and entertainment
- Members: 40

The Literary Society of Washington was formed in 1874 by a group of friends and associates who wished to meet regularly for "literary and artistic improvement and entertainment". For more than 140 years, this literary society has convened monthly for discourse and the reading of essays written by members. The Society consists of approximately 40 Members, plus Honorary Associates and Emeritus Members. Unlike many similar social organizations, the Literary Society has included women members since its founding. The Society has no formal building or address, but meets in member homes or other locations.

"Only in Washington could such a grouping have come to pass," wrote anthropologist Alice Fletcher in 1908. "Not only were its members drawn from different sections of the country, but they represented the varied life of the capital city. Within the charm of the drawing-room, officials of the Government, legislators, writers, artists, scientists and private men and women met together, dropping, for the time being, all titles of distinction and becoming simply companions under the Egis of Learning."

According to a printed history of the Society, members have included three presidents of the United States, justices of the Supreme Court, the speaker of the House of Representatives, the attorney general, the secretary of state, two secretaries of the Smithsonian Institution, four librarians of Congress, three archivists of the United States, and over a dozen college and university presidents.

The Society remains active. Current members are drawn from public service, publishing, academia, and the arts. Most are published authors.

== History ==
In 1873, Olive Risley Seward discussed forming a group to hold regular social and literary gatherings meetings with two of her friends, Esmeralda Boyle and Sara Carr Upton. Seward was the adopted daughter of William H. Seward, Lincoln's Secretary of State, and editor of the book William H. Seward's Travels Around the World.

On January 6, 1874, the three friends and 27 other founding members met to sign the Constitution of the Literary Society of Washington. The meeting was held "at my mother's house, 723 Twenty-first Street, in our back parlor," wrote Esmeralda Boyle afterwards. Sixteen of the 30 original members were women. Founding members included Brig. Gen. Benjamin Alvord, musician Signor Antonio Barili, Col. I. Edwards Clarke, Elliott Coues, Col. Edward H. Cummins, Chief Justice of the Court of Claims Charles Daniel Drake, novelist and Madeleine Dahlgren, Theodore Gill, Abraham Lincoln's secretary and biographer John George Nicolay, and Prof. Samuel Tyler.

Many members of the Literary Society were later involved in forming prominent Washington institutions including the National Geographic Society, the Cosmos Club, the Anthropological Society of Washington, and the Columbia Historical Society (since renamed the Historical Society of Washington and located at the City Museum of Washington, D.C.).

One member wrote that during the Ulysses S. Grant Administration, the Literary Society "promised a pleasant contrast to the rather dusty, arid and scarcely spiritual atmosphere of official life, whether at the White House or in the local atmosphere."

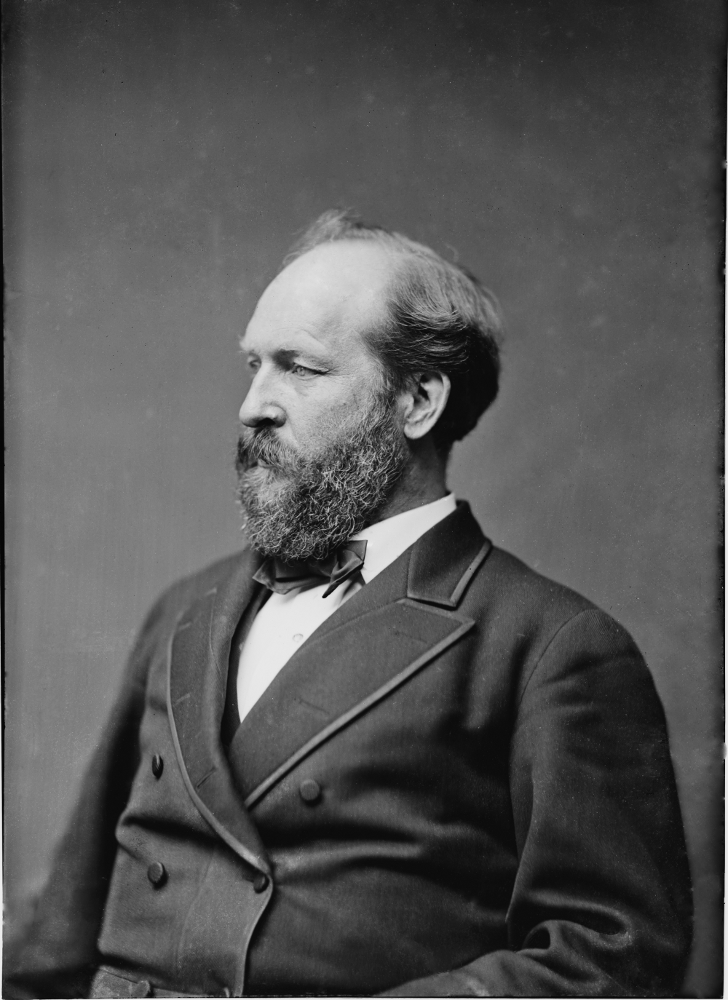
U.S. president James Garfield was also President of the Literary Society at the time his assassination in 1881. The Society members published a book of essays in his memory.

President James A. Garfield "took a leading role in the exclusive 'Literary Society of Washington,'" reported the Washington Post, and was serving as President of the Society when he was assassinated on July 2, 1881. At a special meeting of the Society after Garfield died, members presented memorial essays that were compiled into a book, A Tribute of Respect from the Literary Society of Washington, to its late President, James Abram Garfield. Garfield's widow, Lucretia Garfield, remained active with the Society for many years and his son, James R. Garfield, Secretary of the Interior during Theodore Roosevelt's administration, was a member.

Inventor Alexander Graham Bell was a member of the Society from 1889 to 1922, overlapping for 33 years with his longtime rival, Edward M. Gallaudet, founder of Gallaudet University, who was a member from 1878 to 1917. Gallaudet was an ardent proponent of the use of sign language by deaf individuals, while Bell advocated lip reading, speech therapy, and greater integration of deaf and hard-of-hearing people into hearing society. Their long-running debate continues to resonate in the deaf community today. See History of deaf education in the United States.

Many of the Society's members were among the first generation of anthropologists and ethnographers in the U.S. during the 1880s and 1890s. John Wesley Powell (member from 1883 to 1902) was director of the Bureau of Ethnology at the Smithsonian Institution, where he led a team that seriously documented the culture of Native Americans for the first time. Among Powell's fellow Society members and associates at the Bureau were William Henry Holmes (member from 1886 to 1933), later Chief of the Bureau of Ethnology and director of Smithsonian American Art Museum; Col. Garrick Mallery (member from 1876 to 1894), the "father" of the study of Indian sign language and pictographs; Alice Cunningham Fletcher (member from 1889 to 1923), the first prominent female American anthropologist who visited numerous North American Indian tribes and transcribed hundreds of their songs before they were lost; Matilda Coxe Stevenson, an ethnologist who documented the Pueblo Indians; and Frank Hamilton Cushing (member from 1890 to 1900), who "went native" and lived with the Zuni Pueblo Indians from 1879 to 1884 to learn about their culture, becoming the first anthropologist to use participant observation as a research strategy.

On the Society's 25th Anniversary in 1899, a longtime member, Ainsworth Rand Spofford, the sixth Librarian of Congress, read a paper before the Society reflecting on the group's experiences in which he recalled,

In our evening exercises there has prevailed a varied range and compass of topics, fitted to bring out earnest thought and many-sided comments. Essays, criticism, poems, short stories, reviews of noted books, characterizations of great writers, social studies, descriptive sketches and brief discussions, occupy the hour. The only topics excluded ... are those which touch the realm of politics or the domain of religion. In our literary symposia controversy has no place. With all our freedom and variety of opinion, my colleagues will bear me witness, our discussions have never degenerated into personality or rancor. Catholics and Protestants, Democrats and Republicans, we have met upon the common ground of literary and social good fellowship.

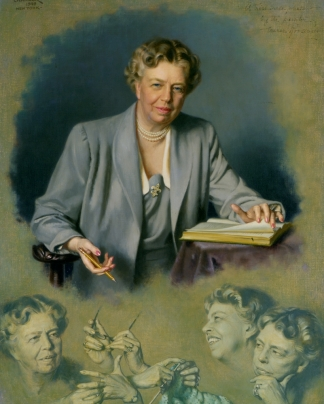
Eleanor Roosevelt was a member for five years and entertained the Literary Society at the White House.

Eleanor Roosevelt entertained the Society at the White House in 1936 and later became a member. In an article on "this grand old organization" in the Washington Post on April 1, 1937, Marilyn Lukens Beall wrote that, "Both President Garfield and President Theodore Roosevelt were enthusiastic members of the L.S. of W. and insisted upon the meetings being held at the White House. History repeated itself last year, when our present First Lady was introduced to the club, and in her usual cordial, thoughtful way, entertained the members at 1600 Pennsylvania avenue." Mrs. Roosevelt later became a member from 1937 to 1942.

== Prominent members ==
Members of the Literary Society of Washington (and the years they were members) included the following individuals. Directories of past members are included in Sixty Years of the Literary Society by Helen Nicolay and The Literary Society in Peace and War by Thomas Spaulding. Selected members are listed in the Library of Congress catalogue record for the Society's archives. A member list for 1882 is also included on pages 54–55 of A tribute of respect from the Literary Society of Washington, to its late President, James Abram Garfield.

- Adams, Jr., Joseph Quincy (1940-1946)
- Alvord, Gen. Benjamin (1874-1878)
- Bell, Alexander Graham (1889-1922)
- Bell, Alexander Melville (1882-1906)
- Berryman, Clifford K. (1920-?)
- Burnett, Frances Hodgson (1877-1887)
- Bush, Vannevar (1940-1945)
- Carmichael, Leonard
- Carpenter, Frank G. (1910-1924)
- Coues, Elliott (1874-1881)
- Coville, Frederick V. (1918-1937)
- Cushing, Frank H. (1890-1900)
- Dahlgren, Madeleine Vinton (1825-1889)
- Dall, William H. (1903-1928)
- Fletcher, Alice C. (1889-1923)
- Foster, John W. (1889-1917)
- Gallaudet, Edward M. (1878-1917)
- Garfield, James A. (1876-1881)
- Gill, Theodore (1874-1914)
- Greely, Adolphus (1888-1933)
- Grosvenor, Gilbert Hovey (1907-1910 and 1925-1963)
- Grosvenor, Melville Bell (?-1982)
- Hale, Edward Everett (1903-1909)
- Hawley, Joseph R. (1881-1905)
- Hay, John (1902-1905)
- Hayes, Rutherford B. (1878-1881)
- Henry, Joseph (1878-1879)
- Holmes, William H. (1886-1933)
- Hoopes, Townsend
- Kennan, George (1881-1924)
- Landon, Margaret (?-1993)
- Lewis, William M. (1923-1929)
- MacLeish, Archibald (1939-1941)
- Mallery, Garrick (1876-1894)
- Malone, Dumas (1930-?)
- Marvin, Cloyd H. (1930-?)
- Nicolay, John G. (1876-1901)
- Nordhoff, Charles (1876-1901)
- Noyes, Theodore W. (1907-1946)
- Phillips, Duncan (1913-1921)
- Powell, John Wesley (1883-1902)
- Roosevelt, Eleanor (1937-1942)
- Roosevelt, Theodore (1902-1918), cited as "an enthusiastic member" in Beall
- Schurz, Carl (1878-1880)
- Spofford, Ainsworth Rand (1880-1908)
- Stafford, Wendell Phillips (1874-1901)
- Stevenson, Matilda Coxe (1887-1889)
- Walker, John (1943-?)
- Wentzel, Volkmar (1980-2006)
- Woodward, Robert S. (1910-1924)
- Wright, Louis B. (?-1984)

== Selected books written by members ==
Over the last 140 years, members of the Literary Society have published hundreds of books, from Olive Risley Seward's Travels Around the World, a bestseller in 1873 coauthored with her stepfather William Seward, to Judith Martin's Miss Manners' Guide to Excruciatingly Correct Behavior (2005) and John F. Ross's War on the Run: The Epic Story of Robert Rogers and the Conquest of America's First Frontier (2009). Among the many notable books by members are the following:

- Arana, Marie, Bolívar: American Liberator (2013).
- Billington, James Hadley, The Icon and the Axe: An Interpretive History of Russian Culture (1970).
- Bird, Kai, American Prometheus: The Triumph and Tragedy of J. Robert Oppenheimer (2005).
- Brunett, Mrs. Frances Hodgson, Little Lord Fauntleroy* Carpenter, Frank, Carpenter's World Travels.
- Cozzens, Peter, The Earth Is Weeping: The Epic Story of the Indian Wars for the American West (2016).
- Dahlgren, Madeline, Etiquette of Social Life in Washington
- Fletcher, Alice, Indian Story and Song.
- Gallaudet, Edward Miner, History of the College for the Deaf, 1857-1907.
- Hale, Edward Everett, The Man Without a Country (1863).
- Landon, Margaret, Anna and the King of Siam
- Hoopes, Townsend, The Limits of Intervention (1965).
- Nicolay, Helen, The Boys' Life of Abraham Lincoln.
- Nicolay, John and John Hay, Abraham Lincoln: a History.
- Powell, John Wesley, The Exploration of the Colorado River and Its Canyons.
- Roosevelt, Theodore, The Rough Riders.
- Terzian, Philip, Architects of Power: Roosevelt, Eisenhower, and the American Century
