= Seward Square =

Park in the United States of America

Coordinates: 38°53′9.62″N 76°59′58.18″W

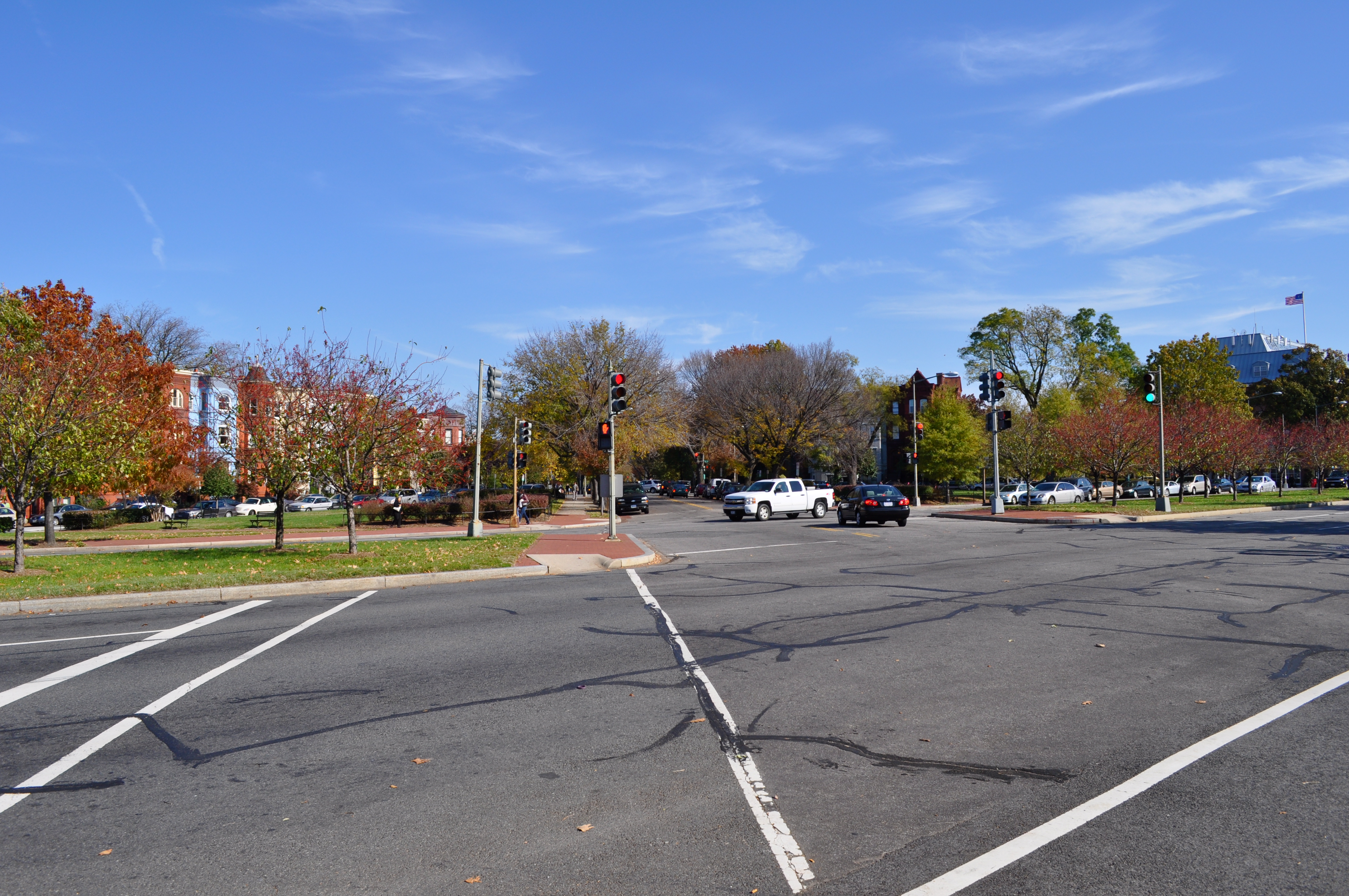
Seward Square in Southeast Washington, D.C. as seen from the intersection of North Carolina and Pennsylvania Avenues.

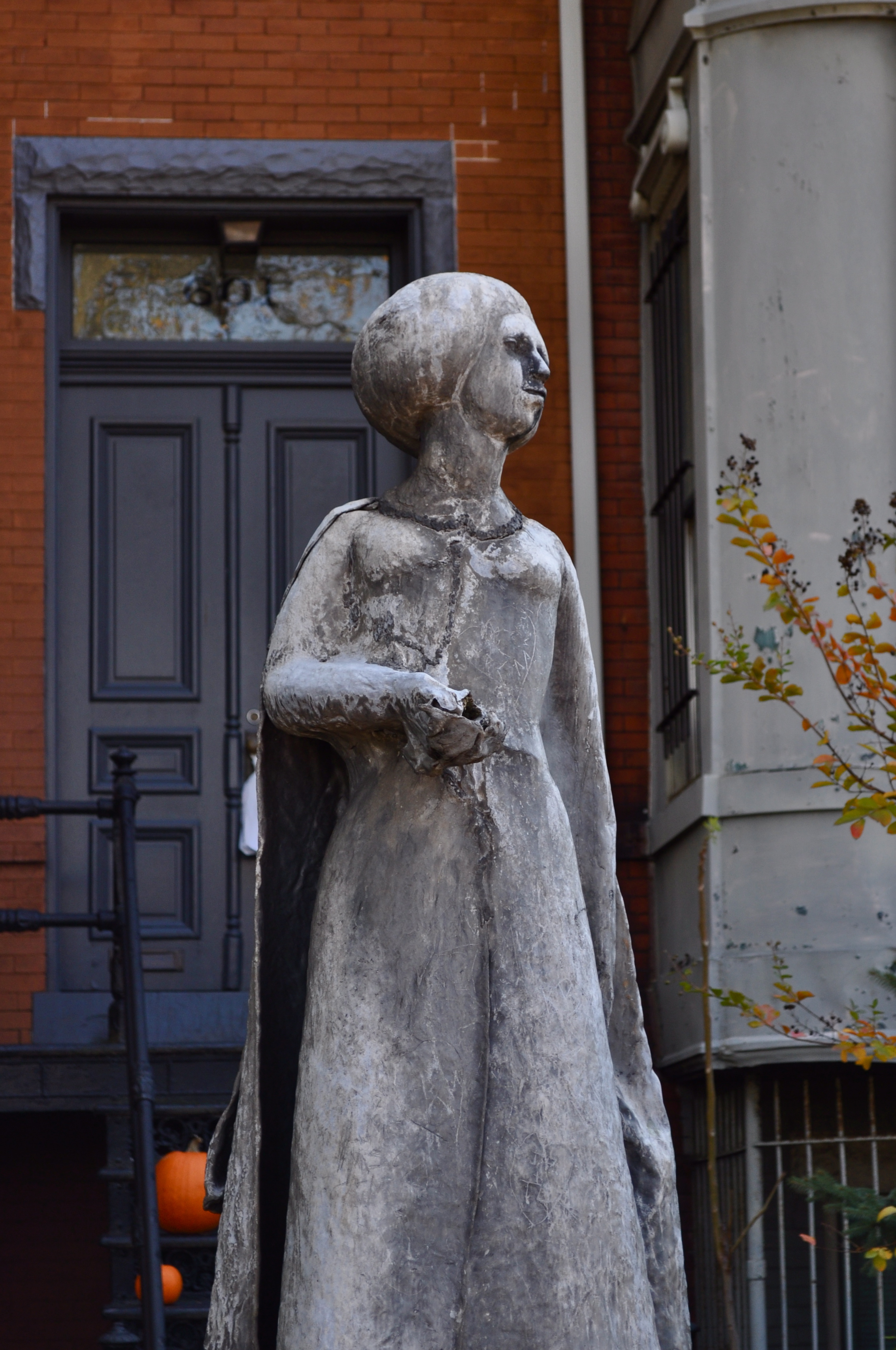
Sculpture of Olive Risley Seward adjacent to Seward Square as seen from the southeast corner of 6th Street and North Carolina Avenue.

Seward Square is a square and park maintained by the National Park Service located at the intersection of Pennsylvania Avenue and North Carolina Avenue in the Capitol Hill neighborhood of Southeast Washington, D.C. The square is bounded by 4th Street to the west and 6th Street to the east. North and south of the park are the respective westbound and eastbound lanes of Seward Square, SE. Because Pennsylvania and North Carolina Avenues intersect in the middle of the square, it divides the square into four unique smaller parks. The park is named after William Henry Seward, the United States Secretary of State under Presidents Abraham Lincoln and Andrew Johnson. Seward is noted for his part in the American purchase of Alaska from the Russian Empire in 1867. The purchase was ridiculed at the time and was colloquially known as "Seward's Folly". There is no statue of William Seward on the site of the park, however there is a statue of his adopted daughter, Olive Risley Seward located at a private residence at the corner of 6th Street and North Carolina Avenue, SE. The statue was sculpted in 1971 by John Cavanaugh.
