= Lucy Webb Hayes National Training School =

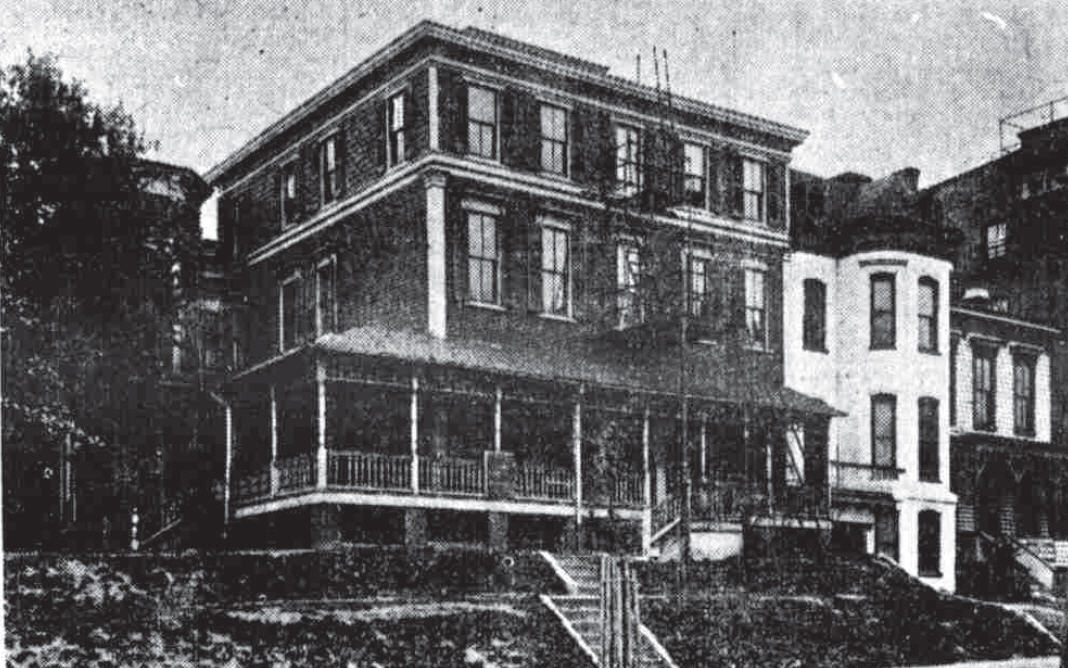
Lucy Webb Hayes National Training School, 1150 North Capitol Street, NW, shortly before being razed in April 1912 to make way for an addition to Sibley Memorial Hospital.

Lucy Webb Hayes National Training School was a religious training school, now a hospital, in Washington, D.C. So named in memory of Lucy Webb Hayes, the wife of former President Rutherford B. Hayes. It was founded in 1891 and was the authorized training school of the Woman's Foreign Missionary Society of the Methodist Episcopal Church, which owned the property of the school, exercised supervision and jurisdiction over its management, and looked to it to supply the trained workers employed by the society in its widely diversified fields of labor. The privileges of the school were not, however, confined to those connected with the Woman's Home Missionary Society. It opened its doors to all who wanted to prepare themselves for any department of Christian activity. In 1894, the school was chartered by act of Congress in conjunction with the Deaconess Home and Sibley Memorial Hospital, and formed with them one corporation. The unified administration and guaranteed the training of Christian workers.

Currently doing business as Sibley Memorial Hospital, the full legal name for the hospital is "Lucy Webb Hayes National Training School for Deaconesses and Missionaries".

== History ==
Lucy Webb Hayes National Training School had its origin in a thought which was expressed at Spiegel Grove when the thousands were gathered there for the funeral services of Mrs. Hayes, who, as the wife of a president of the United States, and as the president of the Woman's Home Missionary Society of the Methodist Episcopal Church, had endeared herself to US women. The remembrance of the deep interest which Mrs. Hayes had manifested in the training of women as missionaries suggested the founding of a school to carry out this purpose as a suitable monument to her memory.

At the meeting of the board of managers, the following was introduced by Elizabeth Lownes Rust, the corresponding secretary, and adopted: "Resolved further, That we invite the auxiliaries, circles, bands, and friends of the society to contribute offerings as precious memorials, to be forwarded to the general executive board of managers to meet in Indianapolis the last of October, to be consecrated to the erection of a building which shall hear her name, and serve as a reminder of her deep interest in behalf of missions in our land."

At the annual meeting of the general executive board in Indianapolis, the establishment of an institution for the training of young women for Christian work, to be a memorial of Mrs. Hayes, was determined upon, and in answer to circulars sent out, the sum of US$4,000 was gathered. In the winter of 1889–90, Jane Bancroft Robinson, the author of Deaconesses in Europe and America, and the secretary of the bureau for deaconess work, visited Washington, and by her presentation of the subject in the leading churches, and at the residences of Bishop Hurst, Postmaster-General Wanamaker, Senator Blair, and Mrs. E. J. Somers, so aroused public interest that the rental of a house was offered by Susan J. Wheeler for the beginning of the work in Washington. Rev. I. N. Dalby, M. D., was elected the first president of the institution. Upon his resignation, September 1, 1894, Rev. A. H. Ames, M. D., D. D. was selected as his successor, entering upon his duties December 1, 1894. In May, 1892, Christine B. Dickinson was elected preceptress.

Within three years from the time of the opening of the National Training-school the enlargement of its accommodations became an obvious necessity. More candidates were applying for admission than could be received, and meanwhile the demand for deaconess workers all over the Church was constantly increasing as their value and usefulness became better understood. Rooms were rented in an adjoining building, and the next year others were added, until in 1899 it was said that parts of six houses were being utilized.

In 1897, at the 17th Annual Meeting at Baltimore, it was resolved to enlarge the Training school plant by the erection of a new building, in the same block with the Lucy Webb Hayes Training school, to be named "Rust Hall" as a tribute to Mrs. E. L. Rust for her many years of service to the Woman's Home Missionary Society. Through the kindness of George O. Robinson, of Detroit, money was advanced, first, to purchase land, and then, this having been secured, to erect the edifice. A site was secured, and ground was formally broken November 16, 1899. The building was begun in 1901, the first brick being placed November 6, and the cornerstone laid on the 14th.

== Buildings ==
=== F Street ===
The house at 133 F Street NE., was formally opened and dedicated May 15, 1890. During that year, eight Christian women offered themselves for deaconess work and spent more or less time in the home. This successful beginning seemed to indicate that the District was the proper place for the location of the training school designed as a memorial of Mrs. Hayes. At the annual meeting of the society at Syracuse, New York, in October, 1890, the following action was taken: "Resolved, That the training school for missionaries and the Deaconess Home be united in one institution, and named in memory of Lucy Webb Hayes, and located at Washington, D. C."

=== Nash Hall ===
In 1890, Ephraim Nash, was so moved with interest in the deaconess work that he determined to give his own residence at 1140 North Capitol street, to the Woman's Home Missionary Society as a National Training School. It occupies high ground, with much open space about it, commanding extensive views of the city. Lines of street railway are near it, which make all parts of the city accessible. The property of the institution consists of a large building used for all purposes by the training school, and the Sibley Memorial Hospital immediately contiguous to it, a narrow passageway alone separating the rear of the buildings. The home was enlarged and beautified, and was formally dedicated in October, 1891.

=== Deaconess Home ===
This was a part of the institution. Deaconesses who had been licensed by the church and assigned to Washington lived here with the pupils of the school, assisting them by precept and example. This common life in the home was not only an important part of the training and discipline of the school, but furnished to the workers, whose sympathies were heavily drawn upon by actual contact with the poor, the suffering, and the distressed, a place of rest and relief.

=== Sibley Memorial Hospital ===
In October, 1894, the institution was further enriched by the donation to it of a hospital, costing $10,000, donated by William J. Sibley, esq., as a memorial of his deceased wife, Dorothea Lowndes Sibley. The hospital was built upon the grounds attached to the school, forms with it one corporation, and entered upon its mission of active beneficence. The hospital adjoined the school.

=== Rust Hall ===
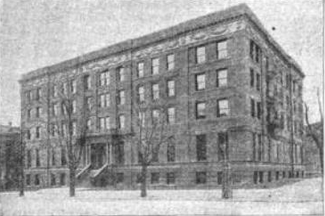
Rust Hall

The building faced 130 feet (40 m) on North Capitol Street, and was 80 feet (24 m) deep on the M Street front. Rust Hall was a five-story structure. It contained 115 rooms, of which 15 were for public use. The building accommodated 100 people and provided modern appliances. It was heated by hot water and lit by electricity generated by its own engines and dynamos. It was furnished with elevator and iron stairways. A telephone system connected the institution with the main office. Henrietta A. Bancroft served as chairman of the building committee. Charles W. Gallagher was treasurer and president of the National training school when the building opened.

== Education ==
The pupils were instructed as superintendents of deaconess homes, orphanages, hospitals, and for kindred employments.

The lecturers in the medical department were selected from the staff of Sibley Hospital, and included some of the most eminent and skillful physicians and surgeons of Washington. While some opportunity of studying nursing was given to all pupils, those contemplating to be nurse deaconesses would have special facilities both for study and practice.

The design of the training school was to prepare young women for active Christian work as visiting deaconesses, nurse deaconesses, city missionaries, pastoral helpers, or as industrial and kindergarten teachers. The instruction included biblical and ecclesiastical training, such knowledge of medicine as was preparatory to nursing, and practical teaching in all that was necessary to fit pupils as superintendents of deaconess homes, orphanages, hospitals, and for kindred employment.

== Tuition ==
The expenses of the school were purposely reduced to the minimum. The entire cost, including board, room, tuition, and lectures, would be from $3 to $5 a week, varying with the share of household work assumed by the student. Those who paid $5 a week were exempt from domestic service. Many pupils preferred doing their share of household work, thereby bringing their expenses to the limit of $3 a week. Those who came on this basis could be educated and boarded an entire scholastic year for $100. The work was arranged so as to not interfere with studies.

== Bibliography ==
- North-Western Conferences of the Methodist Episcopal Church (1903). Northwestern Christian Advocate. Vol. 51 (Public domain ed.). Chicago, Illinois: Swormstedt & Poe.
- Superintendent of Charities (1895). Report on charitable and reformatory institutions of the District of Columbia (Public domain ed.). Washington, D. C.: Government Printing Office.
- Tomkinson, Laura E. (1903). Twenty Years' History of the Woman's Home Missionary Society of the Methodist Episcopal Church, 1800-1900 (Public domain ed.). Cincinnati, Ohio: Woman's Home Missionary Society of the Methodist Episcopal Church.
