= Elizabeth Lownes Rust =

American philanthropist, humanitarian, missionary (1835–1899)

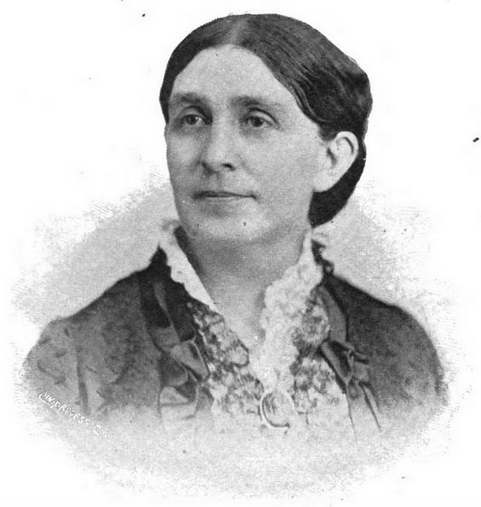
- Born: Elizabeth Lownes; 1835; Baltimore, Maryland, US
- Died: 3 Oct 1899 (aged 63–64); Cincinnati, Ohio, US
- Resting place: Spring Grove Cemetery, Cincinnati
- Occupations: Artist, philanthropist, letter writer
- Spouse: Richard S. Rust (m. 1875)
- Children: Richard Hubbard Rust

Elizabeth Lownes Rust (née , Lownes; 1835 – October 3, 1899) was a 19th-century American philanthropist, humanitarian, and Christian missionary, remembered as a woman of vision. She conceived the idea of the Woman's Home Missionary Society of the Methodist Episcopal Church, and as its corresponding secretary for nearly twenty years, she helped to shape its policies.

== Early life and education ==
Elizabeth Lownes was born in Baltimore, Maryland, 1835. She was of Scotch and Welsh ancestry. Her parents, Josiah B. and Anna Burdsal Lownes, were Quakers. For several generations her ancestors were members of the Society of Friends, the Quakers. Among those ancestors were several teachers and preachers. After leaving Maryland, the family removed to Montgomery County, Ohio, and settled on a farm near Centerville, Ohio. Elizabeth's siblings included William S., Miriam, Rebecca, and Susan.

Rust graduated from Cooper Seminary in Dayton, Ohio in 1853. Later, she studied art.

== Career ==
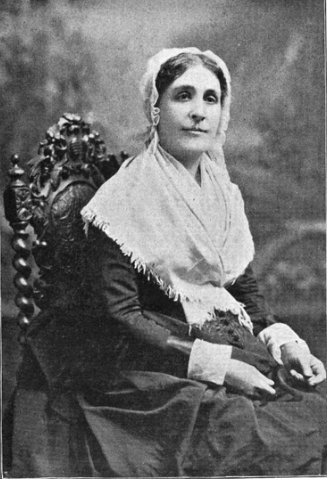
Elizabeth Lownes Rust

During the Civil War, she was president of a branch of the United States Sanitary Commission. She developed a strong taste for art, and for several years was engaged as instructor in art in the Cincinnati Wesleyan Female College during its earlier history. She gained some recognition as an amateur artist and portrait painter, and in 1871, went abroad for further study. In Paris and Rome, she enjoyed special opportunities under the guidance of Madam Marjoli, the sculptor, and Jules Richomme, the painter. In Paris, she had friendly relations with the families of Edmond de Pressensé and Nicholas Sylvester Bercier, the Protestant divines. On her return to the United States, her future was bright.

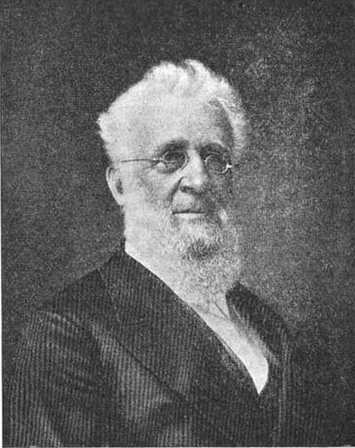
Rev. Richard Sutton Rust

In 1875, she married Rev. Richard Sutton Rust. D. D., LL. D. and henceforth, she became actively identified with the Methodist Episcopal Church, of which her husband had long been a minister. He was for several years the Corresponding Secretary of the Freedmen's Aid Society of the Methodist Episcopal Church. Her marriage gave her unusual opportunities and incitements in humanitarian work. With him, she provided philanthropic work among the recently emancipated slaves, and traveled through the South. Rust College is named after Rev. Rust.

In 1876, Rust organized a philanthropic movement for the African Americans of Cincinnati, which continued its usefulness for several years. In 1877, she took an active part in the charitable work of the city, proposing plans to aid the poor and control vagrancy. From these early years, she was connected with the Woman's Christian Temperance Union, anxious to cast her influence on the side of temperance and purity movements. She became identified with many local philanthropies, securing the employment of matrons at police stations, and women to take charge of the female wards of prisons. Because of this latter interest, she was appointed by the mayor one of the managers of the female department of the City Workhouse. She urged for the admission of industries into the regular course of the public schools, which was put into action.

Rust was a co-founder, in 1880, of the Woman's Home Missionary Society of the Methodist Episcopal Church. It promoted the welfare of the Freedmen, through teaching, providing provisions, and imparting to them the knowledge of good housekeeping and self-care. Rust aided in organizing this society, and for many years served as its corresponding secretary. Correspondence often kept her busy until the early hours of the morning. Leaflets and letters were constantly being created to broadcast the needs of the cause and the suggestive remedies. Visiting nearly every field where the society was laboring, her reports were full of interesting facts.

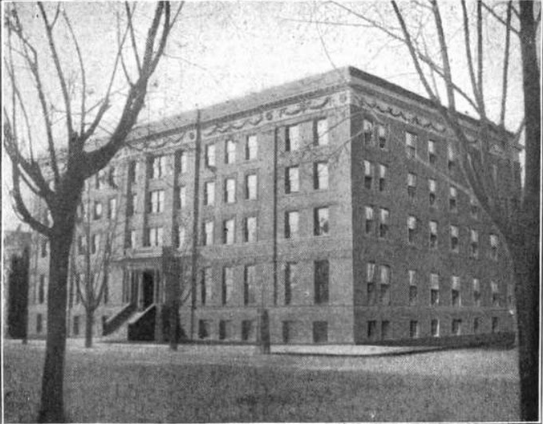
Rust Hall

The Lucy Webb Hayes National Training School for Missionaries and Deaconesses, located at Washington, D.C., was the most important enterprise of the society. The location of the school on North Capitol Street afforded ample space for enlargement, and this occurred with the erection of Rust Hall, located near the place where she was born. For three years, while she was sick, suffering from weakness and difficulty in breathing, her sickroom became the center of her work. She dictated hundreds of letters pertaining to the welfare of the society.

In 1895, Rust founded the Civic League. A veteran organizer, she held conferences with circles of ladies, and the board of officers was carefully chosen.

== Death ==
Rust died of cancer in Cincinnati, October 3, 1899, after a long and painful illness, and was buried at that city's Spring Grove Cemetery.
