= Volkmar Wentzel =

American photographer (1915–2006)

- Born: Volkmar Kurt Wentzel; February 8, 1915; Dresden, Germany
- Died: May 10, 2006 (aged 91); Washington, D.C., U.S.
- Occupations: Photographer; cinematographer
- Spouse: Viola Kiesinger
- Children: 3
- Relatives: Kurt Georg Kiesinger (son-in-law)

Volkmar Kurt Wentzel (February 8, 1915 – May 10, 2006) was an American photographer and cinematographer. He worked for nearly 50 years for the National Geographic Society as a darkroom technician and photographer, and his professional and personal work was highly acclaimed. He was one of the first people to take photographs of then-little known country of Nepal, and was noted for documenting the final years of many of the traditional tribal kingdoms of Africa.

== Early life ==
Wentzel was born February 8, 1915, in Dresden, Germany. He was one of four boys born to Dr. Fritz Gustav Wentzel (a chemist) and his wife, Verna Jatho Wentzel.

His father was an amateur photographer who sold photographic chemicals. His father was also a friend of the photochemical pioneer Hinricus Lüppo-Cramer, and preserved much of Lüppo-Cramer's work after his death. Volkmar Wentzel later said his father would sometimes punish his sons by making them take a "time-out" in his photographic darkroom, but that Volkmar soon learned to love the space. "This was a terrifying, almost traumatic experience, until by accident, with the flick of the darkroom's amber-red inspection light switch, the magic world of photography, my lifetime love, was revealed," he later said. When Wentzel was nine years old, he and his father built a wooden pinhole camera and his first photographs were of statues in the Grosser Garten near their home.

Post-World War I Germany was ravaged by economic and political dislocation. Dr. Wentzel was offered a job as director at an Ansco photographic paper manufacturing plant in Binghamton, New York, so the family moved to the United States in 1926.

Wentzel's mother died in 1931, and his father (burdened with a demanding job, and writing books on photographic materials) became unable to adequately care for his four teenage sons. Wentzel and a friend, Bill Buckley, sold some personal items, pooled the money they had earned from their newspaper home delivery jobs, and decided to settle in South America. They dropped out of high school and departed Binghamton in February 1934, arriving in D.C. after three days of walking and hitchhiking. Naïvely intending to spend the night with President Franklin D. Roosevelt, they walked through the deserted grounds and to the north entrance of the White House only to find that the president was not in residence. They slept that night in a YMCA at Farragut Square. But when they awoke in the morning to find their bedroom full of cockroaches, the boys divided their money (each received $70) and parted. Although Buckley said he was returning to Binghamton, Wentzel rented a room in the Lafayette Square townhouse of Roosevelt aide Thomas Gardiner Corcoran.

Wentzel soon moved to West Virginia. While staying at Corcoran's home, he met German-born architect Eric Menke (who had come to D.C. to work on a proposed Municipal Center), who told Wentzel about a burgeoning artists' colony in Aurora, West Virginia. The colony offered to pay Wentzel $2.50 a week to care for the cabins and studios on the property; he accepted, and moved to Aurora in the summer of 1935.

== Early photographic career ==
=== Beginnings in Aurora ===
The artists' colony in Aurora consisted of a log cabin tavern on U.S. Route 50, and a lodge and studios (of various sizes, and constructed of various kinds of materials) in the nearby woods. Among the artists, diplomats, philosophers, and writers staying at the colony were the painter Robert Gates and his wife, the physician David Lindsay Watson, the psychiatrist Sigurd Graven and his wife, and the former Latvian diplomat Arved Kundzin. Menke suggested that, to make ends meet, Wentzel use the Voigtländer camera his father had given him to photograph the local area and make postcards for sale. Wentzel converted an old pump house across Route 50 from the tavern into a darkroom, although light leaking through cracks in the walls, around the door, and from the ceiling forced Wentzel to primarily use it at night.

During his stay in Aurora, Wentzel finished high school. Local artist Tom Hood had advised that Wentzel should abandon high school in order to help with a national puppetry tour being organized by some Aurora theater people, but an architect friend in Aurora encouraged Wentzel to stay in school.

At first, Wentzel bartered his photographs for food, but when First Lady Eleanor Roosevelt stopped at the tavern and bought three of Wentzel's postcards, Wentzel felt he had a career in photography. (Roosevelt was on her way to Arthurdale, West Virginia. This was a newly built experimental community she had sponsored which taught destitute coal miners subsistence farming. It also taught them local art, craft, and musical traditions so that these traditions might be preserved, the miners might sell crafts for sale, and to create a reason for tourists to come to the town.)

=== Washington, D.C. ===
Encouraged by Roosevelt's purchase, Wentzel moved back to Washington, D.C., in 1935. Once more, he rented a room in a townhouse on Lafayette Square. He received a job as a darkroom technician (at $12.50 a week) with the Underwood & Underwood portraiture and news agency studio. (He later described the job as a "sweat shop".) He was mentored by news photographer Clarence Jackson, and one of his first assignments (to take portraits of the wife of the French ambassador) was published in the Washington Star newspaper. His superiors were so impressed that they gave him a Speed Graphic camera for his own use.

His daytime job left Wentzel little opportunity to take photographs. However, he took courses in photography at the Corcoran School of Art and had several mentors at Underwood & Underwood. His friend Eric Menke bought Wentzel a copy of Paris de Nuit (Paris By Night), a book of nighttime photographs of Paris by the renowned Hungarian photographer Brassaï. Inspired by Brassaï's work, Wentzel began taking photographs of Washington, D.C., by night, sometimes staying up until dawn to learn night photography techniques and find new ways to photograph well-known buildings and landmarks. Wentzel submitted some of these prints to the Royal Photographic Society in early 1936, and over the next six months they were displayed in galleries throughout Europe—winning several prizes.

In late 1936, while passing the National Geographic Society, Wentzel decided on the spur of the moment to ask for a tour of their photographic facilities. The request was granted, and Wentzel toured the lab with his photographs of the city under his arm. The employee giving the tour told Wentzel he was quitting, and Wentzel applied for the position after the tour ended. The personnel director was initially dismissive of Wentzel's interest in the job, but was impressed with the awards his photographs had won. He was granted a job interview, and offered a position in the photography lab in late December 1936.

== Career at National Geographic ==
Wentzel's first day at National Geographic was January 2, 1937. Two months after he started at National Geographic and in celebration of Wentzel's high school diploma, Wentzel's father gave him $135 to buy 13.5 acres (5.5 ha) of land near Aurora. Wentzel built a home on the property in 1973, and lived there and in Washington, D.C., for the rest of his life.

Only a darkroom technician, Wentzel did not have to wait long before he had the opportunity to become a photographer for the Society's magazine. In late 1937, a photographer working on an article on West Virginia was pulled from that assignment and sent to Europe. Due to his familiarity with the state, Wentzel was ordered to complete the photographic assignment. Several of his images appeared in the August 1940 issue of National Geographic. Over the next 48 years, Wentzel was the photographer for 35 stories in National Geographic, and photograph and author for another 10. Wentzel left the magazine at the outbreak of World War II and enlisted in the United States Army Air Corps, where he was assigned photo interpretation duties. He served a portion of his service on the island of Okinawa.

Returning to his job after the war, Wentzel received a number of important assignments. One of his first assignments was to conduct a photographic survey of India. He transformed a U.S. Army ambulance into a mobile darkroom, and traveled more than 40,000 miles (64,000 km) throughout the subcontinent. He crossed into Tibet on foot and by animal. His photographs were some of the first of then-little known Nepal, and some of the last of feudal India. While in Nepal, he also shot a motion picture, "Exploration in Nepal," which was the first film to be taken in that region. He later traveled widely around the globe, photographing people and landscapes in Angola, Cameroon, Cape Horn, Mali, Mozambique, Newfoundland, Norway, South Africa, and Swaziland. He was one of the last photographers to document the fast-vanishing African kingdoms and their still largely intact tribal life. By the time he retired, he was one of the magazine's most widely traveled photographers. Not all of his travels took him far from home, however. After the assassination of President John F. Kennedy on November 22, 1963, Wentzel was one of a small number of photographers and reporters who realized that the president's body would arrive at the White House early in the morning of November 23. Wentzel photographed the arrival of Jacqueline Kennedy and Attorney General Robert F. Kennedy at about 4:20 AM as they and a Marine honor guard escorted the president's coffin from the ambulance into the White House.

In the late 1960s and throughout the 1970s, Wentzel became an advocate for saving, preserving, and archiving National Geographic's photographic negatives, plates, and prints, many of which were being lost due to damage (such as improper storage or pests) or because untrained staff didn't realize their value and destroyed them to obtain filing space. Wentzel was named Director of the National Geographic Society Photographic Archives, and put in charge of the preservation and archive effort—which helped save more than 10 million images and artworks.

Wentzel retired from National Geographic in 1985. In 1981, he and his wife purchased farm and farmhouse (built in 1868) near his original property in Aurora. He and his wife lived in their farm house as well as at a home at 3137 N Street NW in Washington. In 2001, he helped co-found the Aurora Project, an artist-in-residence program in West Virginia, where painters, writers and musicians are given time and space to work. The donation included his long-time darkroom on his original 13.5 acre property.

== Family, death, and legacy ==
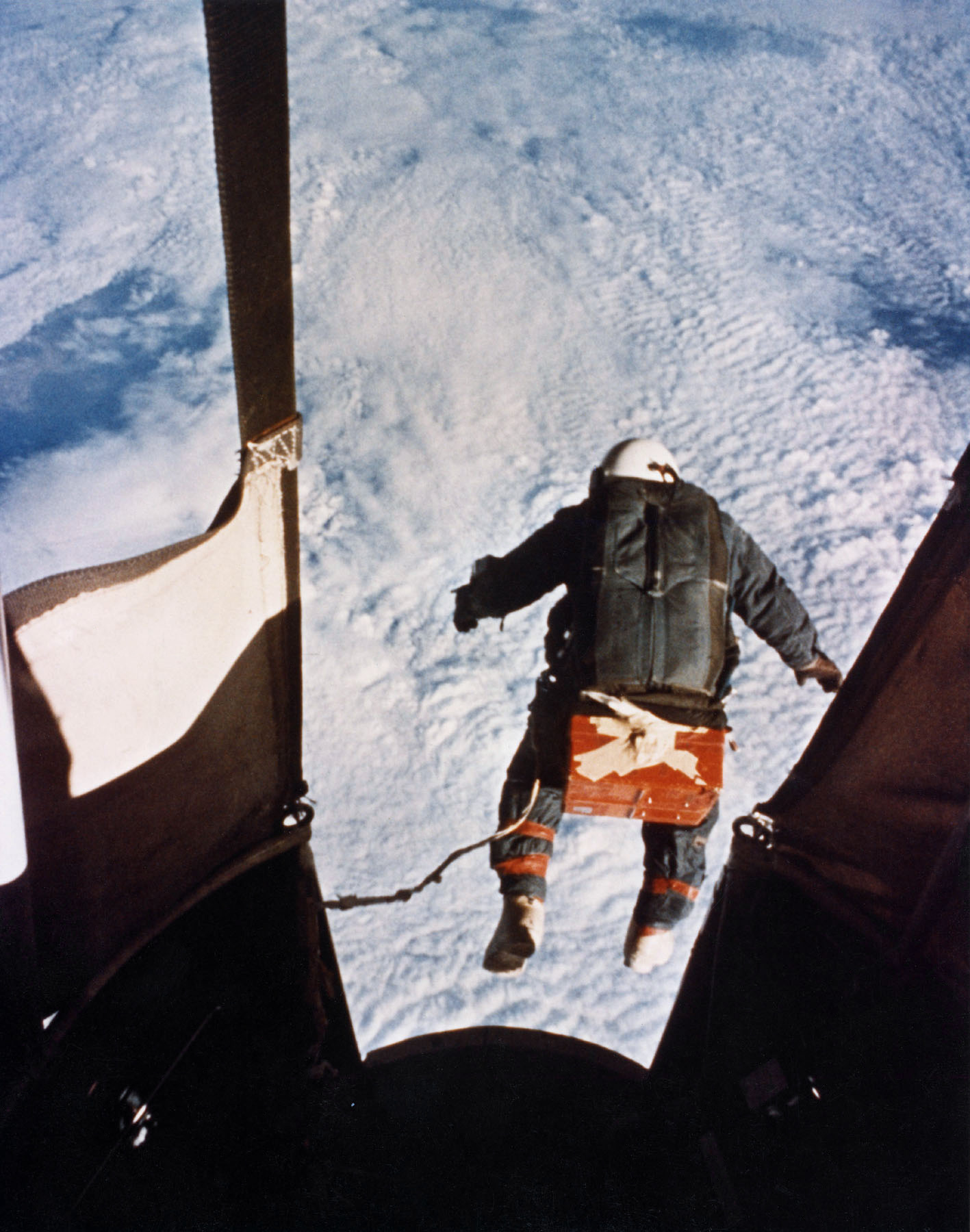
Wentzel's award-winning photograph of Capt. Joseph Kittinger's record-setting high altitude parachute jump in 1960.

Wentzel produced photographs for himself as well as for the National Geographic. During his lifetime, he created more than 12,000 of his own images. Wentzel's photography was exhibited by the Corcoran Gallery of Art, Metropolitan Museum of Art, Royal Photographic Society, the Smithsonian Institution, the Washington Center for Photography, and the West Virginia Cultural Center, among others. His prints have also been displayed in numerous private galleries around the world, and have sold for thousands of dollars each.

His photographic works also won awards. In 1950, the White House News Photographers Association (WHNPA) awarded one of his photos third place in the "Personalities" category. His 1958 photograph of a quadrille on New Year's Eve at the Spanish Embassy in Washington, D.C., won first place from WHNPA. On August 16, 1960, an automatic camera of Wentzel's captured Captain Joseph Kittinger making a 102,800 foot (31,333 m) skydive which set the record for the highest parachute jump of all time. WHNPA also gave this image a first prize. In 2003, the state of West Virginia named him one of 55 "History Heroes" for helping to document, preserve, and promote the state's history.

Wentzel's work is highly acclaimed. Fellow National Geographic photographer Thomas Y. Canby called him an innovative, brilliant, "great man". Jane Livingston, chief curator at the Corcoran Gallery of Art, said his career was a "prolonged, quiet unfolding of genius." Among his more notable photographic articles were:

- "Washington, D.C.: The Nation's Capital by Night" (National Geographic, April 1940).
- "Atlantic Odyssey: Iceland to Antarctica" (National Geographic, December 1955)
- "History Awakens at Harpers Ferry" (National Geographic, March 1957).
- "The White Horses of Vienna" (National Geographic, September 1958)
- "Life in Walled-Off Berlin" (National Geographic, June 1961)
- "Mozambique: Land of the Good People" (National Geographic, August 1964)

His photographs were also featured in three books:

- Washington By Night, (1992) edited by James Goode.
- Odysseys and Photographs: Four National Geographic Field Men: Maynard Owen Williams, Luis Marden, Volkmar Wentzel, Thomas Abercrombie, (2008) by Leah Bendavid-Val.
- In Focus: National Geographic Greatest Portraits, (2010) by the editors of National Geographic.

Wentzel was often asked how he managed to put his subjects at such ease while photographing them. He observed that he read as many ethnographic studies of a region as possible, to avoid making culturally insensitive errors. He also tried to pick up a few words of the local language, and be as courteous as possible. He said that he often made friends with the people he was photographing. "After we got to be friends, I would just back up and take the picture. That was a good part of my technique," he said. He also brought a small musical box along with him, which helped to ease suspicion and win friends (especially among children). His choice of equipment also influenced his style. Wentzel told an interviewer in 1999 that, while in Africa, he used only lightweight 35 mm film cameras such as a Nikon or an Olympus OM-2. For more formal portraits, however, he used an 85mm portrait lens and Kodachrome film. When printing his photographs, he preferred the Ilfochrome process (which turned photographic slides into prints) and the gelatin silver print process.

Wentzel married Viola Kiesinger, daughter of German Chancellor Kurt Georg Kiesinger. The couple had three children: Cecilia, Christina, and Peter. Wentzel died of a heart attack on May 10, 2006, at Sibley Memorial Hospital in Washington, D.C.

== Bibliography ==
- Bendavid-Val, Leah. National Geographic: The Photographs. Washington, D.C.: National Geographic Society, 2008.
- Bendavid-Val, Leah. Odysseys and Photographs: Four National Geographic Field Men: Maynard Owen Williams, Luis Marden, Volkmar Wentzel, Thomas Abercrombie. Washington, D.C.: National Geographic, 2008.
- Canby, Thomas Y. From Botswana to the Bering Sea: My Thirty Years With National Geographic. Washington, D.C. : Island Press/Shearwater Books, 1998.
- Davis, Jeffrey R.; Johnson, Robert; and Stepanek, Jan. Fundamentals of Aerospace Medicine. Philadelphia, Pa.: Lippincott Williams & Wilkins, 2008.
- Hirshson, Stanley P. General Patton: A Soldier's Life. New York: Perennial, 2002.
- Hoffman, Nancy. Eleanor Roosevelt and the Arthurdale Experiment. North Haven, Conn.: Linnet Books, 2001.
- In Focus: National Geographic Greatest Portraits. Washington, D.C.: National Geographic, 2010.
- Kittinger, Joseph W. and Caidin, Martin. The Long, Lonely Leap. New York, Dutton, 1961.
- Krell, Alan. The Devil's Rope: A Cultural History of Barbed Wire. London: Reaktion Books, 2002.
- Mayo, John B. Bulletin From Dallas: The President Is Dead. New York: Exposition Press, 1967.
- Ostroff, Eugene. Pioneers of Photography: Their Achievements in Science and Technology. Boston, Mass.: The Society for Imaging Science and Technology, 1987.
- Photographs, Then and Now. Washington, D.C.: National Geographic Society, 1998.
- Wentzel, Volkmar Kurt. Washington By Night. James Goode, ed. Golden, Colo.: Fulcrum, 1998.
- Wood, John. The Art of the Autochrome: The Birth of Color Photography. Iowa City, Ia.: University of Iowa Press, 1993.
