= Statue of Olive Risley Seward =

Statue by John Cavanaugh in Washington, D.C., U.S.

Olive Risley Seward
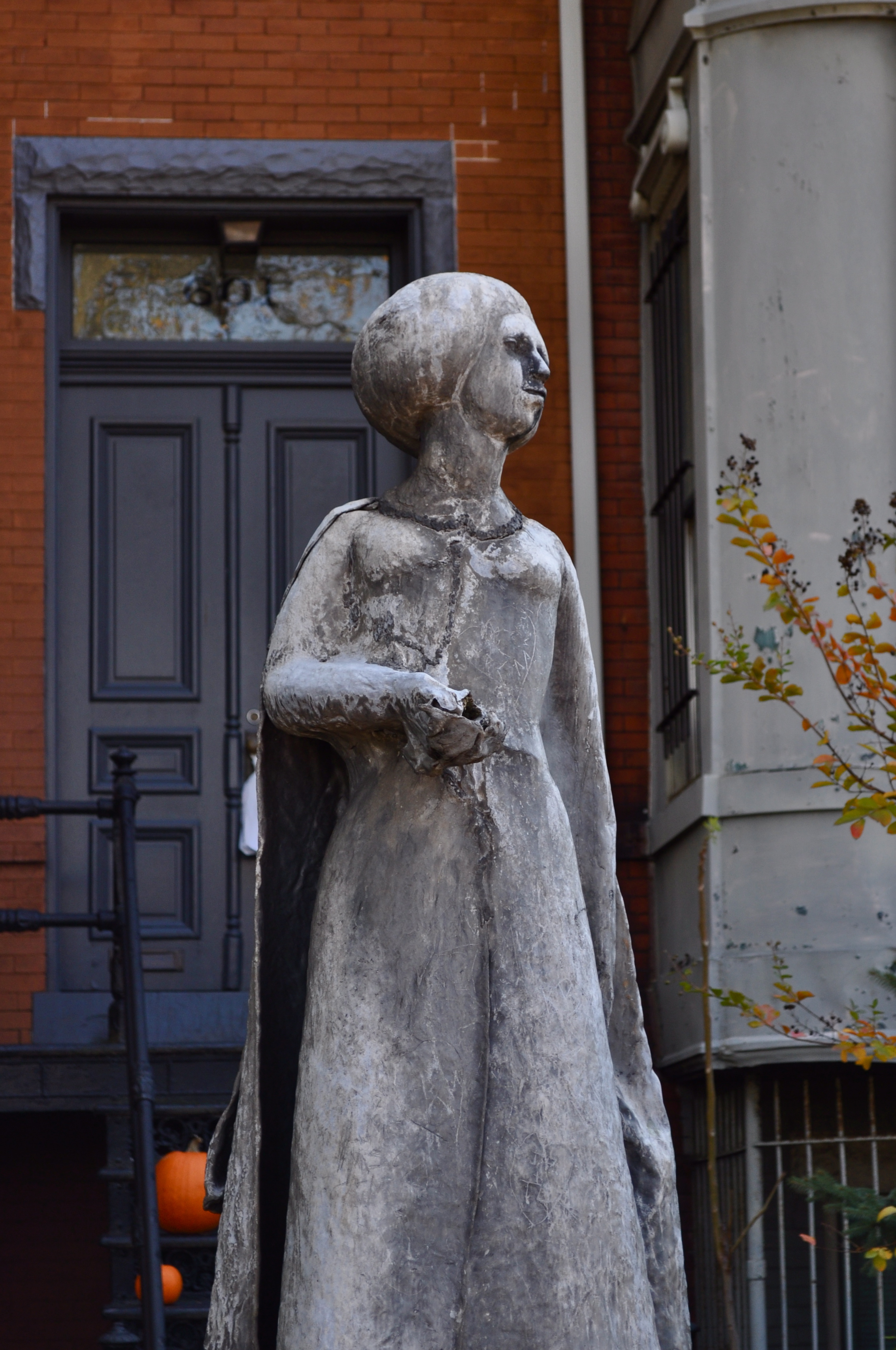
- Artist: John Cavanaugh
- Year: 1971
- Type: Lead
- Dimensions: 180 cm × 61 cm × 69 cm (72 in × 24 in × 27 in)
- Location: Washington, D.C., United States; 38°53′11.2″N 76°59′53.7″W
- Owner: private

Olive Risley Seward is a lead on burlap statue by American sculptor John Cavanaugh, located at North Carolina Avenue and Sixth Street, Southeast, Washington, D.C., in the Capitol Hill neighborhood.

Completed in 1971, it is a representation of Olive Risley Seward (1841–1908), the foster daughter of William H. Seward.

== See also ==
- List of public art in Washington, D.C., Ward 6
