= Sibley Memorial Hospital =

Hospital in Washington, D.C., US

Coordinates: 38.9365°N 77.109°W

- Johns Hopkins Medicine

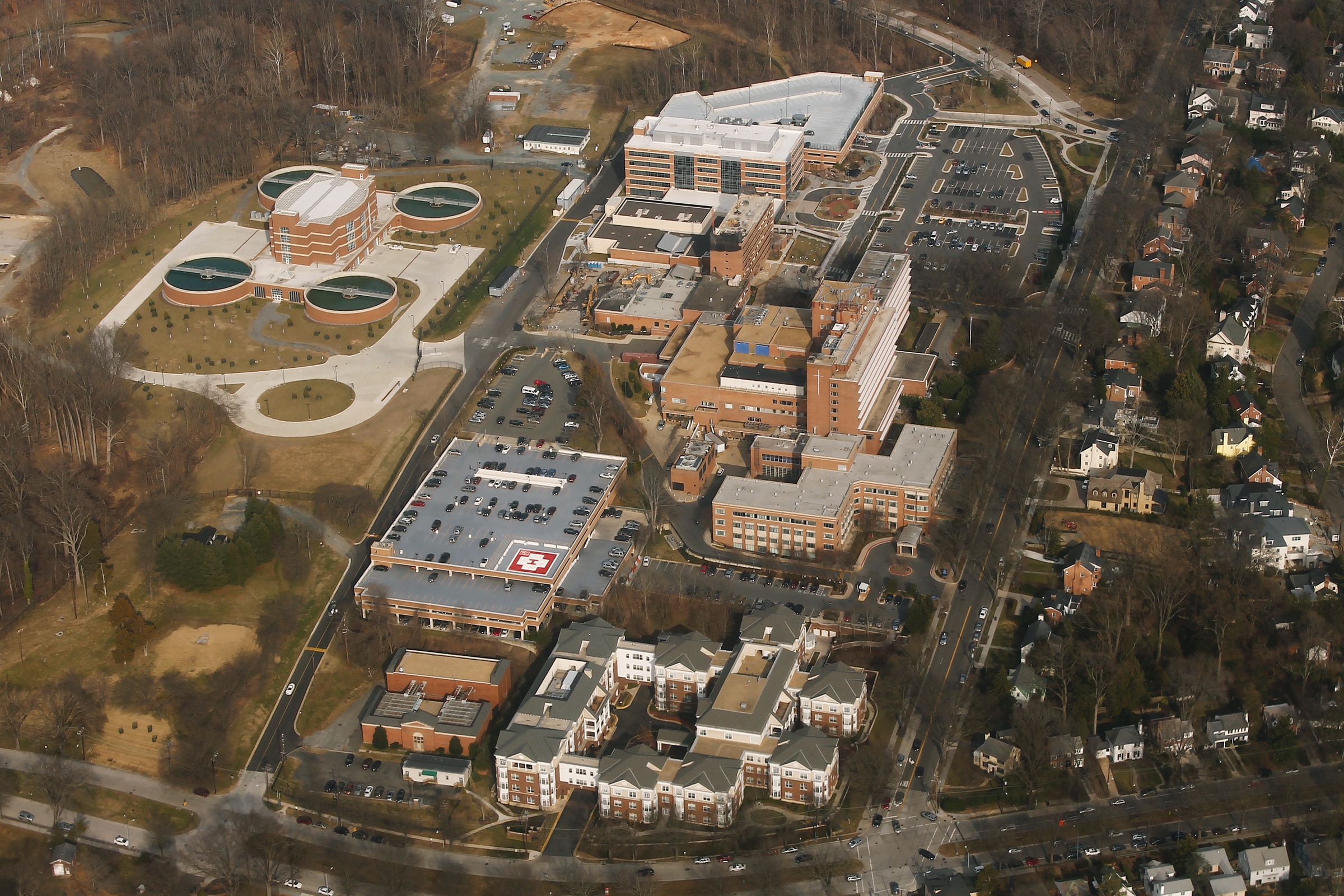
- Sibley Memorial Hospital Aerial in 2013

Geography
- Location: 5255 Loughboro Road, N.W., Washington, D.C., United States

Organization
- Care system: Private not-for-profit
- Type: Teaching
- Affiliated university: Johns Hopkins University School of Medicine

Services
- Emergency department: Yes
- Beds: 245

History
- Founded: 1890

Links
- Website: sibley.org
- Lists: Hospitals in Washington, D.C.

Sibley Memorial Hospital is a non-profit hospital located in The Palisades neighborhood of Washington, D.C. It is fully accredited by the Joint Commission on Accreditation of Healthcare Organizations, and is licensed by the District of Columbia Department of Health and Human Services. The hospital specializes in surgery, orthopedics, and oncology services. It has been part of Johns Hopkins Medicine since 2010.

== History ==
Sibley hospital traces its lineage to the Lucy Webb Hayes National Training School, established in 1890 at a house at 133 F St. NE, but which moved the next year to 1140 N. Capitol St. NW, near the corner with Pierce Street. The institution of the Methodist Church was named in memory of President Rutherford B. Hayes's wife and trained young women for various Christian-related professions, including work for medical facilities and orphanages.

William J. Sibley, a member of the Foundry Methodist Church, donated $10,000 to the school to establish a hospital in memory of his wife, Dorothea Lowndes Sibley. The hospital was dedicated, next to the school on North Capitol Street, in 1894, and opened the following year. It was expanded in 1900 and again in 1925, to occupy the full block at North Capitol Street and Pierce Street.

In 1953, the Methodist Church, which also owned American University, proposed moving Sibley to a spot on Nebraska Avenue on American's campus, citing the need for more space. The city government declined to make a zoning change necessary for the move, effectively blocking it.

Congress helped in 1957, passing a law to grant Sibley 12 acres of land on Loughboro Road in Northwest Washington formerly belonging to the federal government as part of its reservation for the Dalecarlia Reservoir. It had housed the National Training School for Girls, a reform school. In exchange, Sibley had to grant to the federal government the site of Hahnemann Hospital at 135 New York Ave. NE. Hahnemann, formerly the National Homeopathic Hospital, had merged into Sibley the year prior. Sibley moved to the new site in 1961.

In 2010, citing an uncertain financial future, Sibley merged into Johns Hopkins Medicine.

The Hayes School transformed into a nursing school, and the Methodist Church moved it to American University. American closed the nursing school in 1987 due to declining enrollment.

The District of Columbia government built a low-income public apartment building on the former site of the hospital on North Capitol Street in 1968, and named it Sibley Plaza in honor of the hospital.

== U.S. News & World Report ==
As of January 2025, Sibley is ranked #4 in the Washington, D.C. metro area by U.S. News & World Report.

== Patient safety ==
Sibley Memorial Hospital has an A grade "Hospital Safety Score" by The Leapfrog Group as of Fall 2025.

== See also ==
- Lucy Webb Hayes National Training School
