= Olive Risley Seward =

American writer (1844–1908)

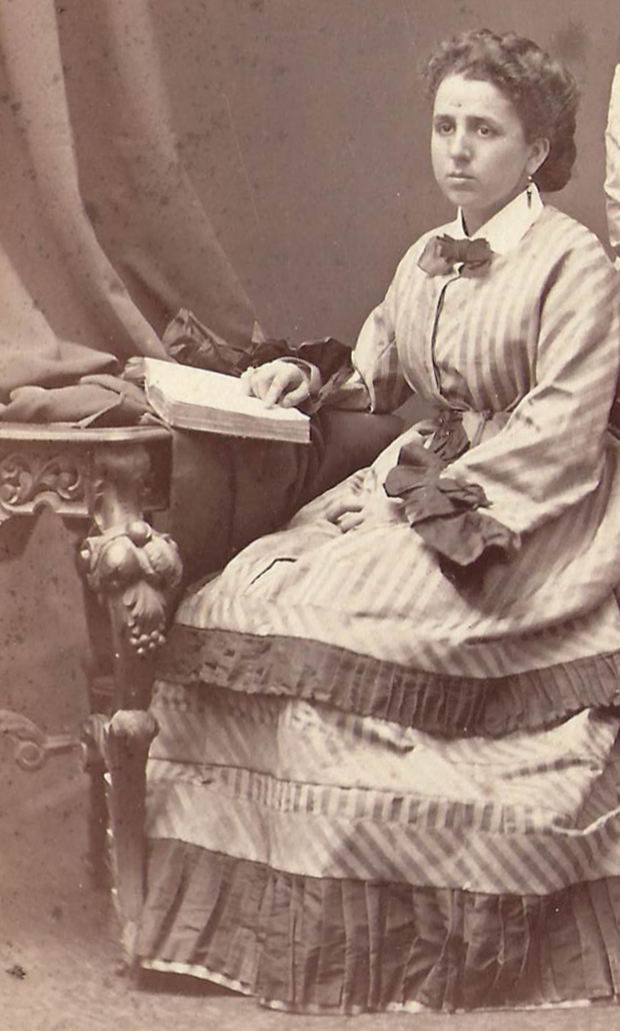
- Olive Risely Seward, adopted daughter of William Henry Seward
- Born: Olive F. Risley; July 15, 1844; Fredonia, New York, US
- Died: November 27, 1908 (aged 64); Washington D.C., US
- Resting place: Forest Hill Cemetery, Fredonia, New York
- Known for: Co-founder of the Literary Society of Washington
- Parent: William H. Seward (adopted)

Olive Risley Seward (July 15, 1844 – November 27, 1908) was a writer and the adopted daughter of William Henry Seward, United States Secretary of State under Presidents Abraham Lincoln and Andrew Johnson.

== Early life ==
Olive F. Risley, was born in Fredonia, New York. She was the daughter of the former Harriet C. Crosby and Hanson A. Risley, a prominent civil servant who later worked for the Secretary of the Treasury and resided in Washington, D.C. She was the fourth of five children, though her three elder siblings died young. She attended local schools and grew up in the cosmopolitan atmosphere of the capital.

== Relationship with Seward ==
Former Secretary of State William Henry Seward, widowed in 1865, took such an interest in Olive Risley beginning in 1868 that Gideon Welles wrote in his diary: "There is much gossip in relation to a projected marriage between Secretary Seward and a Miss Risley. He is in his sixty-eighth year and she in her twenty-eighth. I give the rumor no credit. Yet his conduct is calculated to make gossip. For the last six week he had passed my house daily to visit her." Hanson Risley and his family had known the Sewards for years. Seward had also lost his daughter Fanny in 1866, a close friend of Olive, whose mother died the same year. Olive, her younger sister Harriet Risley and their father, traveled together to California in the summer of 1870 with Seward, where Hanson left the group. His daughters continued with Seward and two other married couples to Japan and China. In Shanghai, when one couple left the group to return home and George Seward, accompanied by his wife, took up his post as the new U.S. consul general in Shanghai, Seward and the two young women faced the prospect of continuing as a gossip-provoking trio. Hanson Risley expressed his concerns by letter to Seward. In order to curtail gossip and family worries that they might marry, Seward formally adopted Olive as his daughter in 1870, though her father was still alive. Seward altered his will to recognize his and Olive's new relationship. Seward's sons wrote letters of support to their father, one saying that they all thanked Olive for "her kind care and affection" for their father, adding: "I see no better or delicate way than this of rewarding its continuance". Seward wrote of Olive to her father: "it seems almost indelicate for me to speak her just praise even to you. She had ripened into a noble, impressive, intellectual and attractive womanhood. All women we meet must give her their love and seek her confidence. All the intelligent and distinguished men converse with her as their equal or superior."

The trio proceeded to visit the Middle East and Europe in 1870–1871. When they returned to New York, Risley and Seward began work on a travel book about their experiences, drawing largely on her journal from the trip. Seward died before the book was finished. Published by D. Appleton & Co. in 1873, William H. Seward's Travels Around the World became a best seller. Risley received credit as the volume's editor and was identified as Seward's executrix. The Seward estate made $50,000 from the sales.

== Inheritance and later life ==
Seward named Risley and his son William as his executors. His sons shared the principal family homestead, while the remainder of the estate was shared equally by Risley and Seward's three sons. Risley's portion was valued at $50,000. She moved back to Fredonia to be with her birth father. By 1874, she had moved to Washington D.C., where she and her lifelong companion Sara Carr Upton co-founded the Literary Society of Washington. She was also a member of the Washington Club and the Daughters of the American Revolution. In 1889, she wrote a book of stories for children based on her travels with Seward called Around the World Stories that was published by D. Lothrop Company.

About 1888 she became a Roman Catholic and spent several years in Rome. She led the fundraising to found a Catholic women's college, Trinity College, now Trinity Washington University, as the first president of its Auxiliary Board.

She died in 1908 at her home on Nineteenth Street, NW, in Washington. She was buried in Forest Hill Cemetery in Fredonia, N.Y., the town where she was born.

== Memorial ==
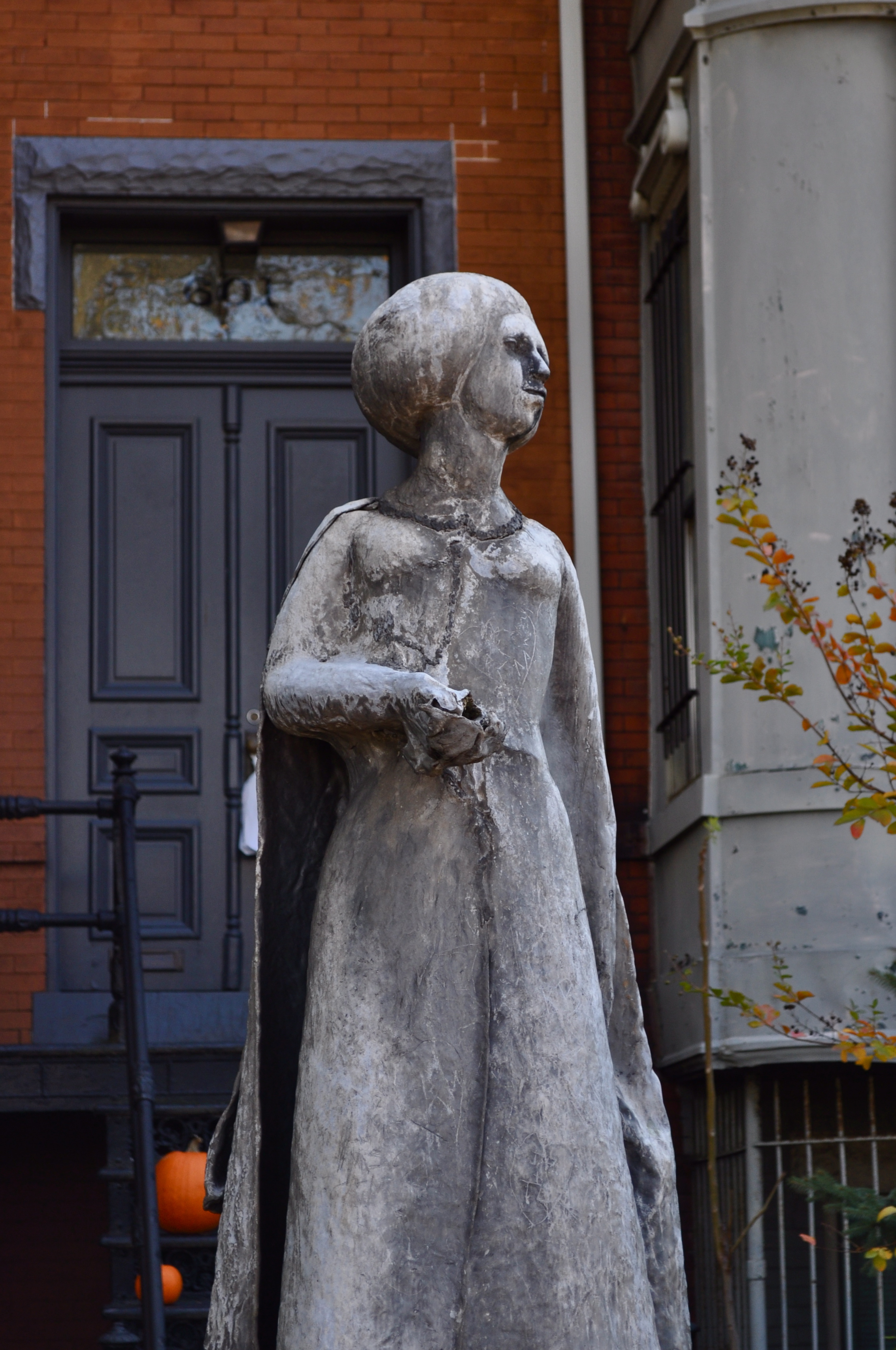
Sculpture of Olive Risley Seward adjacent to Seward Square as seen from the southeast corner of 6th Street and North Carolina Avenue.

In 1971, sculptor John Cavanaugh created a statue honoring her. Lacking a photograph, Cavanaugh sculpted his idea of an idealized Victorian lady instead. The statue stands in front of a private residence on North Carolina Avenue and Sixth Street, SE, in Washington, D.C. Risley's head is turned to the left as if gazing toward nearby Seward Square, named for her adoptive father.
