= John Cavanaugh (sculptor) =

American sculptor (1921–1985)

- Born: John William Cavanaugh; September 20, 1921; Sycamore, Ohio, U.S.
- Died: January 9, 1985 (aged 63); Washington, D.C., U.S.
- Education: Ohio State University (BA)
- Occupation: Sculptor
- Spouse: Janet Corneille (m. 1946)
- Children: 2
- Parent(s): Chauncy Floyd Cavanaugh; Hilda Cavanaugh

John William Cavanaugh (September 20, 1921 in Sycamore, Ohio – January 9, 1985 in Washington, D.C.) was an American sculptor who worked for much of his career in Washington, D.C., where he lived and worked in the Dupont Circle neighborhood. He worked primarily in lead, a poisonous metal. This is believed to have led to his death from cancer of the lungs.

== Life ==
John Cavanaugh was born in rural Sycamore, Ohio as the third of four sons of Hilda and Chauncy Floyd Cavanaugh, intensely religious, poor ethnic Irish parents. His family struggled, especially after the suicide of his father in 1929 when John was eight. Cavanaugh first attended local schools, but his mother recognized and wanted to encourage his creativity, sending him to an Ursuline school for art training. In 1938, Cavanaugh went to live and study art in Urbana, Ohio, under Alice Archer Sewall James (1870-1955), learning to paint. (James was a follower of Swedenborg.) Cavanaugh graduated from Ohio State University, with a BA in 1945, studying English and sculpture.

In 1946, Cavanaugh married Janet Corneille and they had a son together, who died at nine months of hydrocephaly syndrome. In 1949, their second son Jon was born. In 1951, Cavanaugh won a National Sculpture Society Purchase Prize, giving him a lift to have his artistry recognized. But Cavanaugh felt increasingly conflicted about his sexuality, religion and marriage.

In 1956 he left his wife and son, and other family, to move to New York City to pursue his sculpture career and make his way. It caused an irrevocable break with his mother, whom he never saw again. After her death, he became reconciled with his brothers, and maintained a relationship with his son.

By 1959 Cavanaugh had developed what became a lifelong relationship with his partner, Philip Froeder, who became an architect and urban planner. In 1963, they moved to Washington, D.C. where Froeder had gotten work. This developed as an intensely productive time for Cavanaugh, although he became somewhat isolated from the New York art scene. He continued to participate "in biennial exhibitions at New York’s Sculpture Center until 1977. At the same time, Cavanaugh was receiving income from his twice-yearly exhibitions in his Washington studio space" on Swann Street, NW.

He died in 1985 at the age of 63.

== Career ==
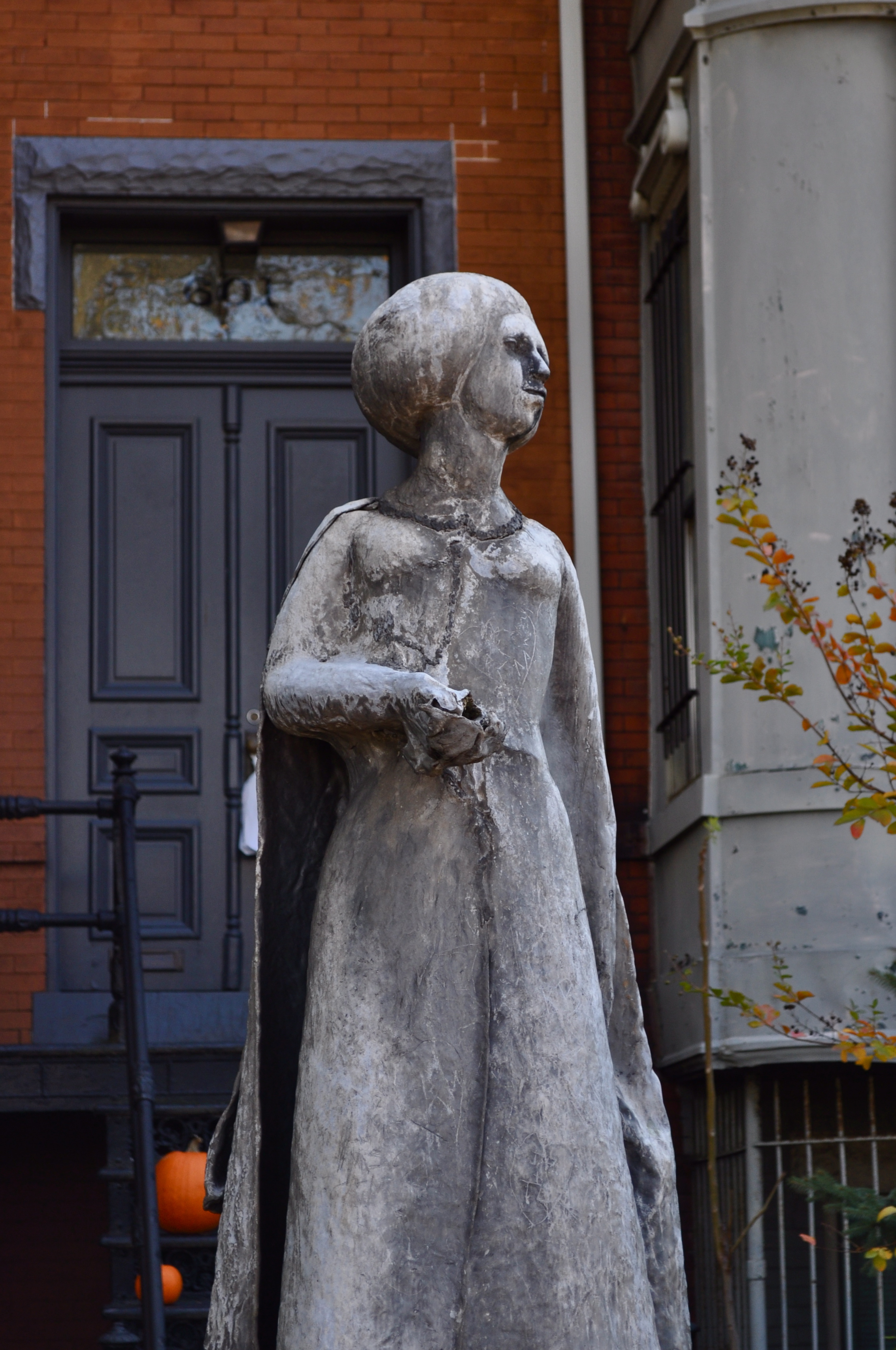
Olive Risley Seward

Cavanaugh's works have been shown at the National Sculpture Center in New York City, and at the National Arts Club in Washington, D.C. Some of Cavanaugh's pieces were presented by President Clinton as state gifts to the presidents of Egypt and France. His sculpture, Demeter, after the Greek goddess of agriculture, is featured in the Friendship Garden of the U.S. National Arboretum. His sculpture of Olive Risley Seward, adopted daughter of William Henry Seward, is installed by a private residence in Southeast Washington, near Seward Square, which is named for the statesman.

Some of his sculptural plaques were installed on buildings in the Dupont Circle area which were restored by his partner Froeder. Cavanaugh was prolific and sold numerous sculptures and other works from his Swann Street studio shows. The breadth of Cavanaugh's work extended into less traditional formats including Flux Box Year Two (1967), one of many compilations of small artists' objects produced by the interdisciplinary movement, Fluxus.

From 2008 to 2011, a retrospective exhibit of Cavanaugh's work, In Search of Motion, traveled to the Saginaw Art Museum, the Kalamazoo Institute of the Arts, and the Dubuque Museum of Art.

== Legacy and honors ==
- The John Cavanaugh Foundation was formed by Philip Froeder and others to preserve his art and make it known.
- The National Sculpture Society annually awards the National Sculpture Society Silver Medal and John Cavanaugh Memorial Prize to artists exhibiting with the institution.
