= Mathilde Esch =

Austrian genre painter

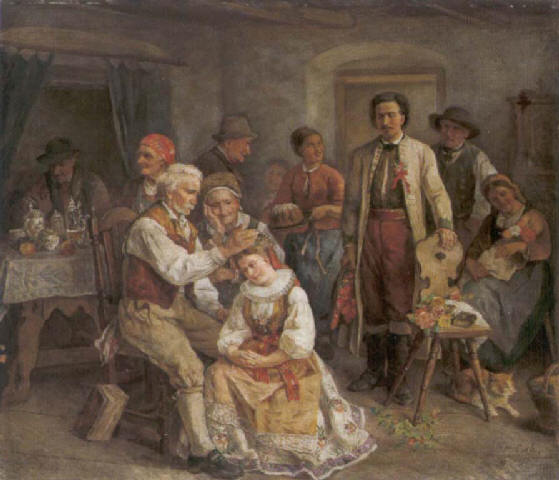
- Kroatische Edelbraut by Mathilde Esch (1880)
- Born: 18 February 1815; Brno, Moravia, Austrian Empire
- Died: 2 May 1904 (aged 89); Munich, German Empire
- Occupation: Genre painter

Maria Mathilde Esch (18 February 1815 – 2 May 1904) was an Austrian genre painter.

== Life ==
The daughter of German architect and local superintendent of construction Josef Esch (1784–1854), Esch grew up in Brno, at the time part of Austria-Hungary. She became a student of several recognized painters of the era, such as Ferdinand Georg Waldmüller and Joseph von Führich, and spent time in cities like Paris, Munich and Düsseldorf.

Following the death of her father in 1854, she permanently moved to Vienna, where she built upon her already existing reputation as a skilled landscape and genre painter by carrying out her profession, with most of her works going into private ownership. She focused primarily on scenes of the German and Hungarian popular culture, but also produced some still lifes. Her paintings were exhibited in Vienna, Munich, Dresden, Prague and Brno.

== Selected works ==
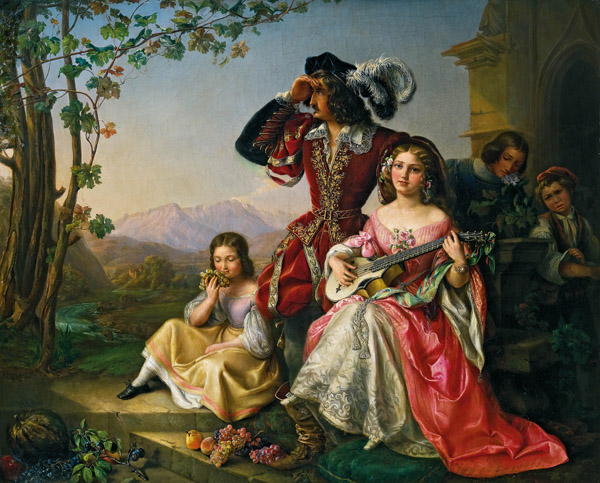
Die 5 Sinne

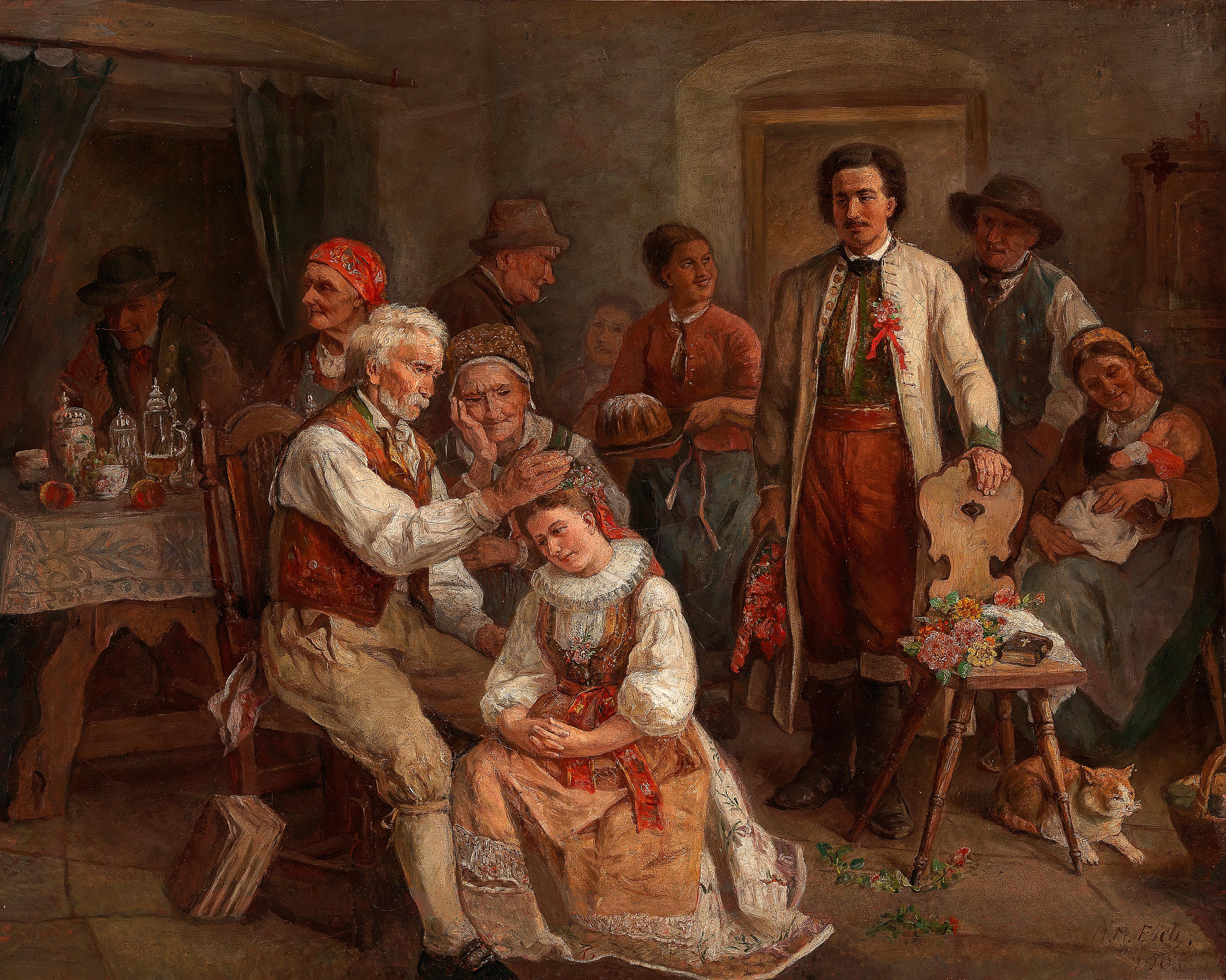
The Noble Croatian Bride

- Bauernhof in Mähren (1856)
- Marktszene in Mähren (1856)
- Münchner Mädchen auf dem Friedhof (1856)
- Die Domkirche auf dem Brünner Petersberge
- Ansicht von Brünn
- Mädchen mit einem Hunde (1858)
- Die Blumenverkäuferin vor der Kirche (1863)
- Kroatische Edelbraut (1880)
- Die 5 Sinne
