= Richard S. Rust =

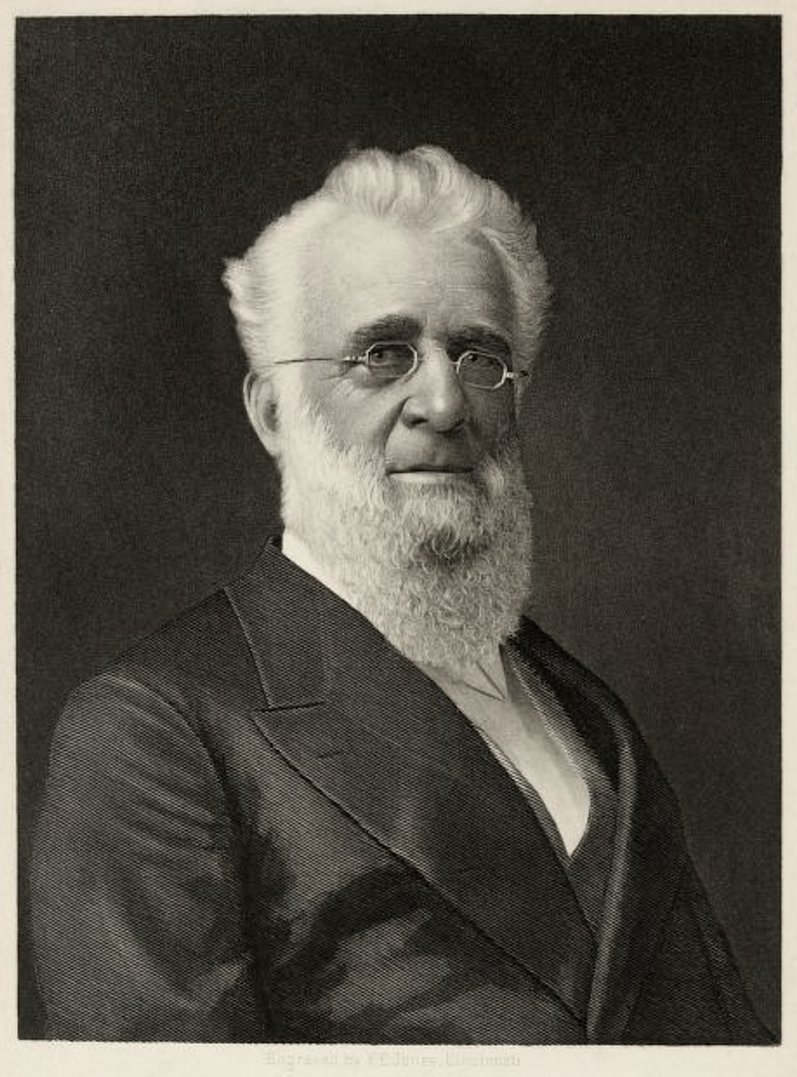
- Richard Sutton Rust
- Born: September 12, 1815; Ipswich, Massachusetts, US
- Died: December 22, 1906 (aged 91); Cincinnati, Ohio, US
- Occupations: Preacher, educator
- Spouse: Elizabeth Lownes Rust (m. 1875; died 1899)
- Children: Richard Hubbard Rust

Richard Sutton Rust (September 12, 1815 – December 22, 1906) was an American Methodist preacher, abolitionist, educator, writer, lecturer, secretary of the Freedmen's Bureau, and founder of the Freedmen's Aid Society. He also helped found multiple educational institutions including his namesake Rust College in Holly Springs, Mississippi, the oldest historically black United Methodist-related college.

== Early life ==
Rust grew up in Ipswich, Massachusetts; he became orphaned at 10 years old, and went to live on his uncle's farm. He attended Phillips Academy and became involved in anti-slavery activities, and after hearing a lecture by George Thompson, he helped form an anti-slavery group on campus, for which he was expelled with two other students in 1834 after refusing to disband. He then attended Noyes Academy, a racially integrated school founded by abolitionists; however, local opposition forced the school to close. He eventually found a school sympathetic to his anti-slavery views in Wilbraham Wesleyan Academy, a school run by the Methodist Episcopal Church, from which he graduated. There, he became an active Methodist. After that, he attended Wesleyan University where he stayed active in the anti-slavery movement, giving lectures and writing on the topic, for which he encountered stiff opposition and was mobbed repeatedly.

During his years at school, in addition to Thompson, he heard notable abolitionists speak such as William Lloyd Garrison, Wendell Phillips, Frederick Douglass, Lucy Stone, and many others.

== Career ==
After graduating from Wesleyan University, Rust became the principal of the New Hampshire Conference Seminary of the Methodist Episcopal Church in 1846, today known as the Tilton School, where he made sure to impress his abolitionist values on all the students. In 1856 he helped found Wilberforce University, a college whose mission was to help educate former slaves and was jointly sponsored by the Methodist Episcopal Church. He became the college's first president, a position he held until 1863.

Richard Sutton Rust, 1860s

During the American Civil War, Rust turned his attention down south. He helped found the Freedmen's Aid Society to give teachers from the North supplies and housing to teach freed slaves in the South. He helped found as many as 30 colleges and institutions, mainly for teachers, with the idea of educating former slaves and their children. One of these schools was Shaw University, which became Rust College. Ida B. Wells was one of the first students taught here in 1870.

After the war, he helped set up the Freedmen's Bureau, an agency of the United States Department of War to "direct such issues of provisions, clothing, and fuel, as he may deem needful for the immediate and temporary shelter and supply of destitute and suffering refugees and freedmen and their wives and children."

In 1875 he married Elizabeth Lownes. Lownes was an artist, but upon marrying Rust, she turned her full focus on humanitarian and evangelical work.

== Published works ==
- The Freedmen's aid society of the Methodist Episcopal church
- Freedom's Gift: Or, Sentiments of the Free (1840)
- The method of introducing religion into common schools (1856)
- An appeal for God's poor (1876)
- Isaac W. Wiley, Late Bishop of the M. E. Church. a Monograph (1885)
