= Bridges Hall of Music =

Concert hall at Pomona College

Mabel Shaw Bridges Hall of Music
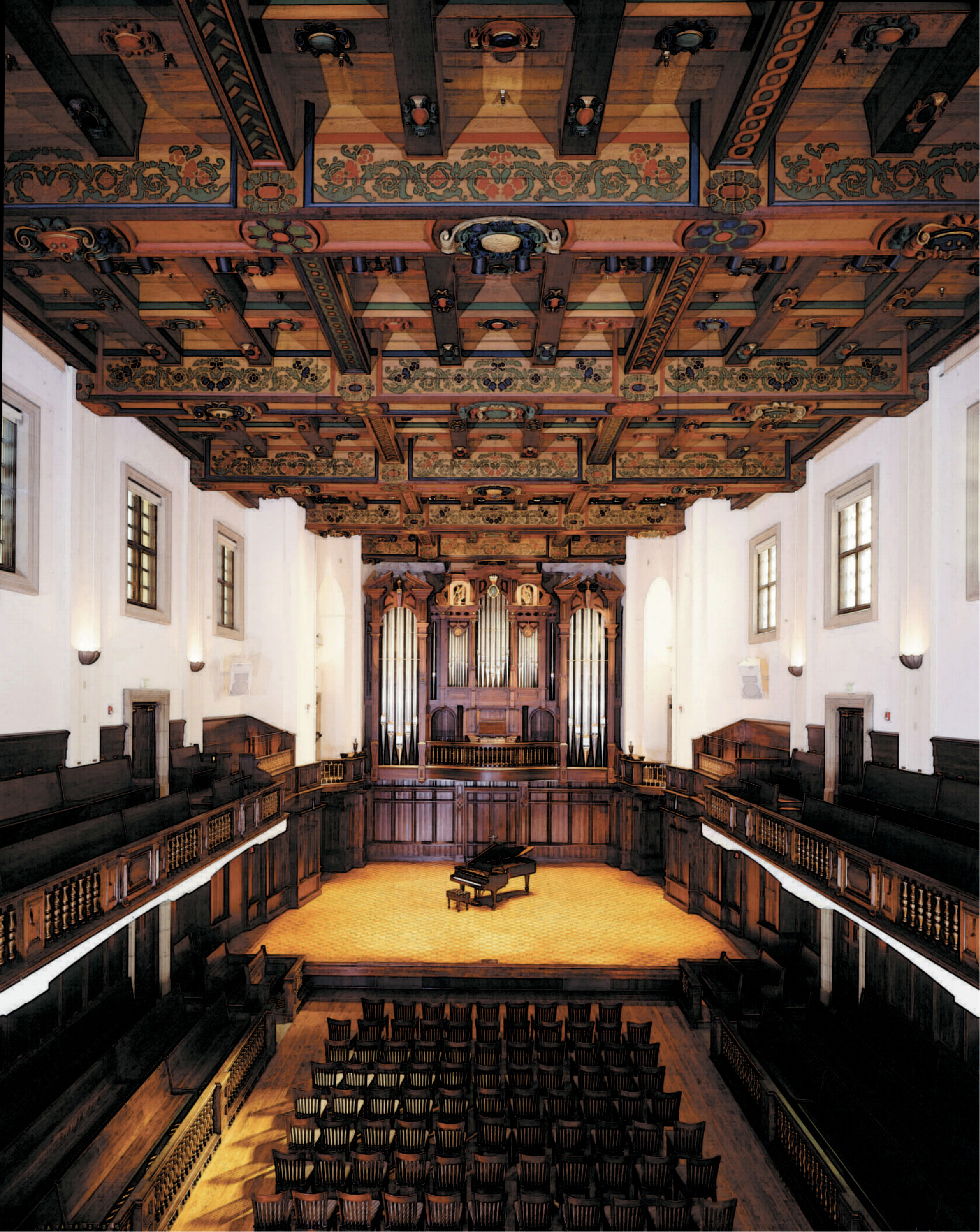
- Interactive map of the Mabel Shaw Bridges Hall of Music area
- Alternative names: Little Bridges

General information
- Type: Concert hall
- Architectural style: Spanish Renaissance
- Location: 150 E. 4th St., Claremont, California, United States
- Coordinates: 34°05′50″N 117°42′50″W
- Named for: Mabel Shaw Bridges
- Opened: 1915
- Renovated: 1971; 1999–2000
- Owner: Pomona College

Height
- Height: 17.2 m (56 ft)

Technical details
- Material: Stucco

Design and construction
- Architect: Myron Hunt

Other information
- Seating capacity: 550
- Public transit: Claremont

Website
- pomona.edu/academics/departments/music-department/facilities/bridges-hall-music

The Mabel Shaw Bridges Hall of Music, more commonly known as Little Bridges (to distinguish it from nearby Bridges Auditorium, known as Big Bridges), is a concert hall at Pomona College in Claremont, California, designed by Myron Hunt and opened in 1915. It was sponsored by a $100,000 gift (equivalent to $3.18 million in 2025) from the parents of Mabel Shaw Bridges, a student in Pomona's class of 1908 who died of illness her junior year. It is used for a variety of musical and non-musical purposes, and is considered the "architectural gem" of Pomona's campus and one of Hunt's finest works.

== History ==
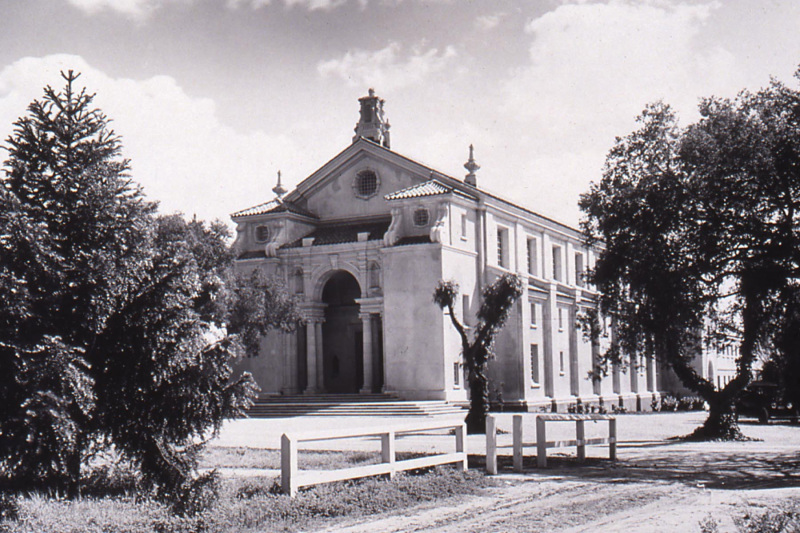
Little Bridges in 1916, shortly after completion

The hall was designed as the primary anchor point for the south side of Marston Quadrangle in Hunt's Master Plan for the Pomona campus.

In its early history, it was the premier destination of choice for prominent visitors to Southern California.

The hall was closed in 1969 following the discovery of structural defects, and fears that it would be demolished prompted a successful fundraising campaign that enabled a renovation, including a seismic retrofitting, beginning in 1971. It was renovated again three decades later, reopening in fall 2000.

Pomona's 2015 master plan identifies Little Bridges as one of five "architecturally distinguished buildings with historic stature", and a 2015 environmental impact report from the college identifies it as eligible for listing on the National Register of Historic Places, although as of 2020 the college has not yet applied for it to be listed. John Neiuber, writing for the Claremont Courier in 2017, expressed surprise it is not listed.

== Architecture ==
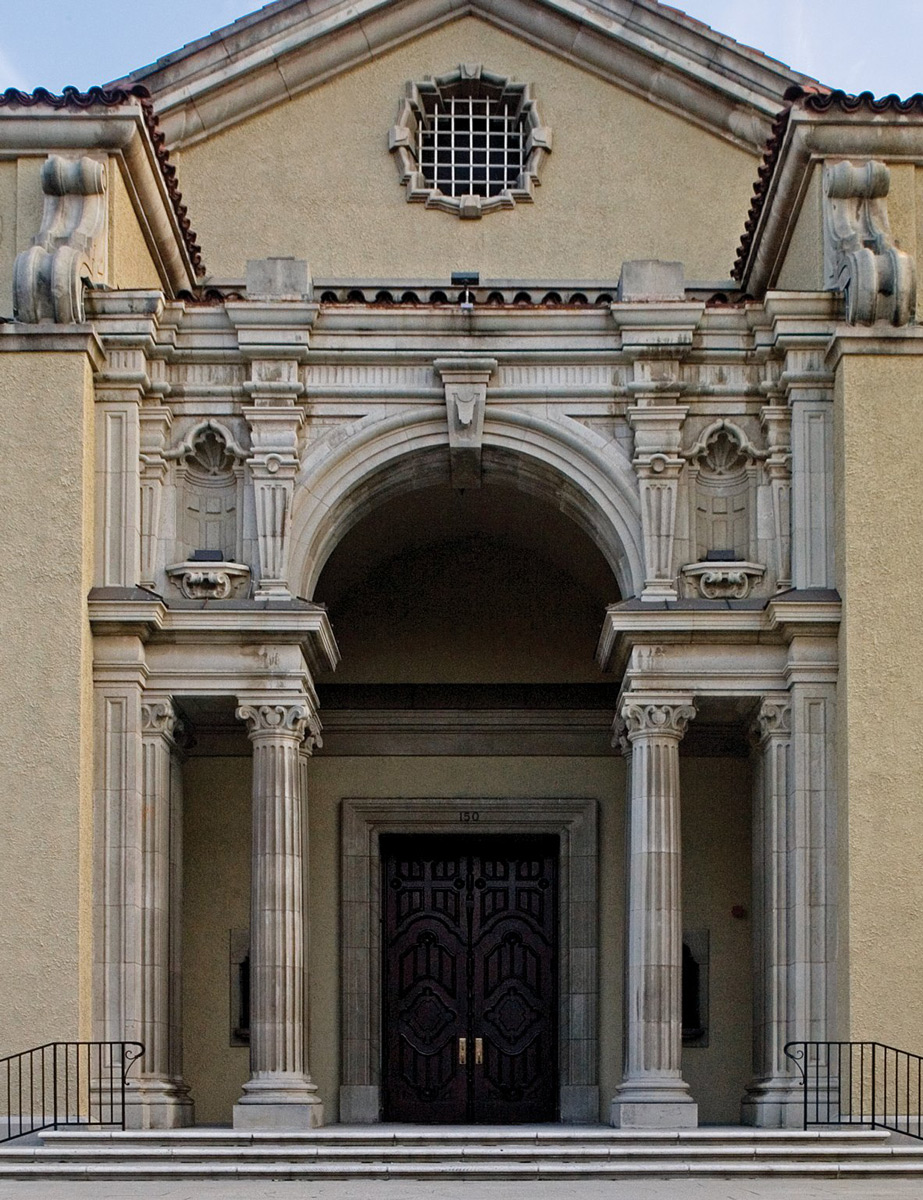
The main (north) entrance to Little Bridges

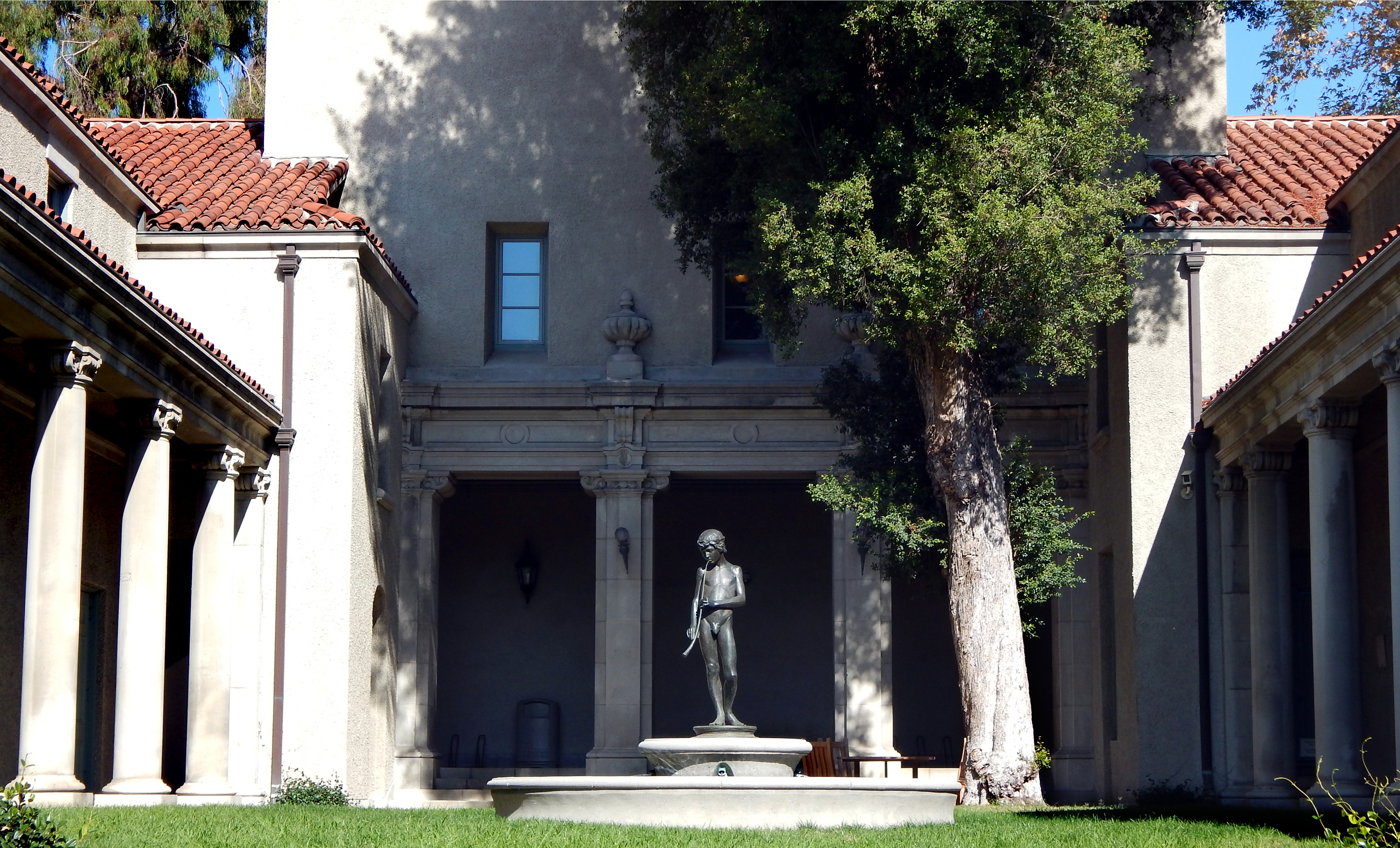
Lebus Court, with The Spirit of Spanish Music at center

The building takes the form of a basilica, and is built in a modified Spanish Renaissance style, incorporating a number of influences.

It is split into two halves. The northern half contains the concert hall, featuring a heavy wood beam ceiling painted with coats of arms from the Medici family. The seating was inspired in part by the British Houses of Parliament, and was designed so that the hall would appear occupied even when filled only to a small portion of its capacity.

The southern half contains a colonnade with Ionic columns surrounding Lebus Court, home to the college's art history department and The Spirit of Spanish Music, a bronze sculpture by Burt William Johnson.

=== Pipe organ ===
The hall's current pipe organ is the Hill Memorial Organ, named after Carrie Schitker Hill. It was constructed by C. B. Fisk and installed in 2001 after a planning process that lasted over a decade, and has 3519 pipes over 66 ranks, weighing 20 short tons (40,000 lb; 18,000 kg). Previously, the hall used pipe organs by M. P. Moller installed at construction and in 1939.

== Usage ==
Pomona uses Little Bridges for a variety of musical and non-musical events, including convocation, practices and performances by the Pomona College Orchestra, and guest speaker lectures. The college also allows community and other outside groups to use the hall. It hosts roughly 45 musical performances per year, most of which are free to all.
