= The Spirit of Spanish Music =

Sculpture by Burt William Johnson

Coordinates: 34°05′49″N 117°42′50″W

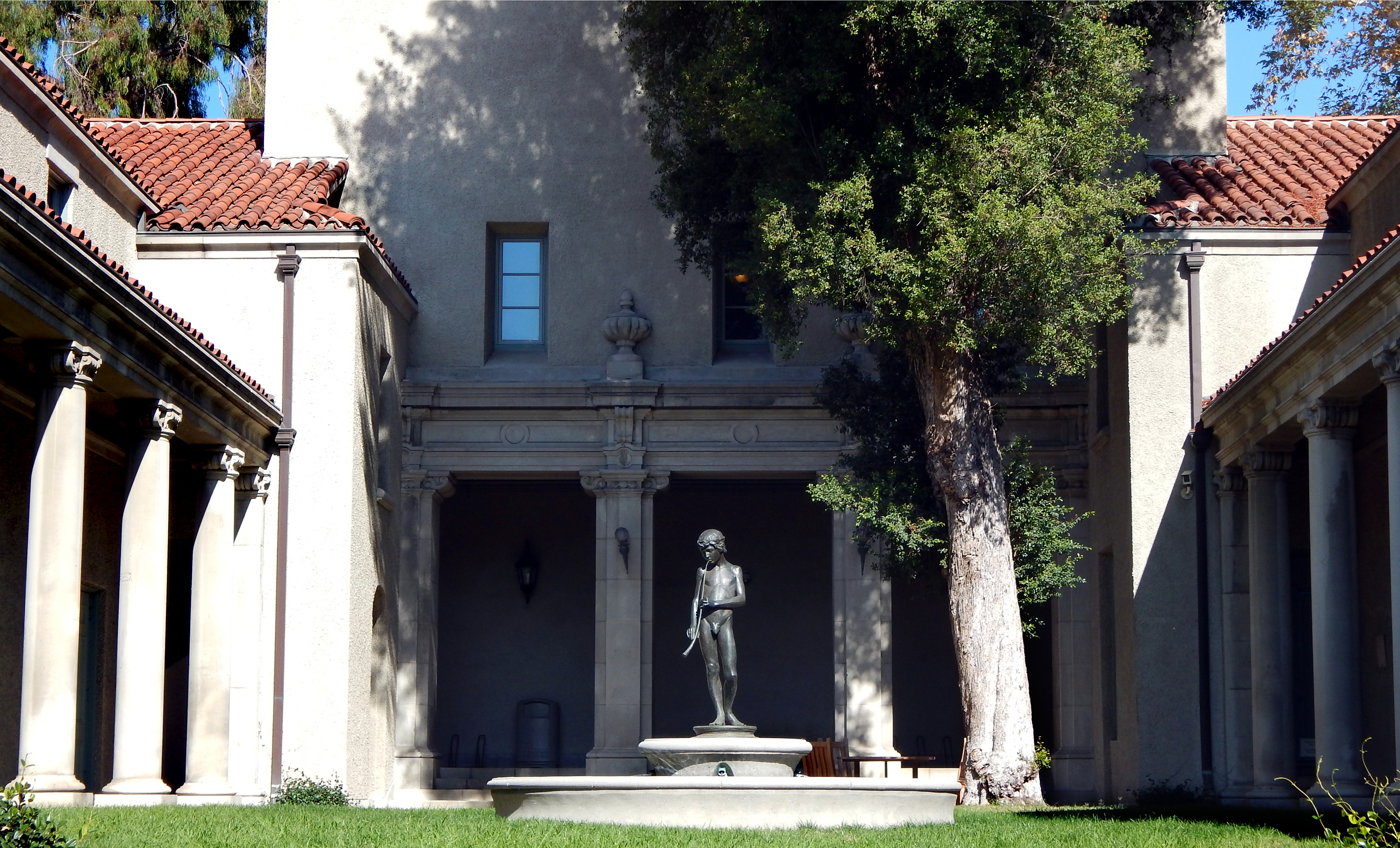
The Spirit of Spanish Music in the Lebus Court of the Mabel Shaw Bridges Hall of Music. Pomona College, Claremont, California, US.

The Spirit of Spanish Music is a sculpture by Burt William Johnson (25 April 1890—27 March 1927). It was commissioned by the Pomona College class of 1915 and placed in the Lebus Court of the Mabel Shaw Bridges Hall of Music at Pomona College, one of a group of buildings conceived for the expansion of Pomona College and built in the mid-1910s by architect Myron Hunt using details of the "ornamental Spanish style".

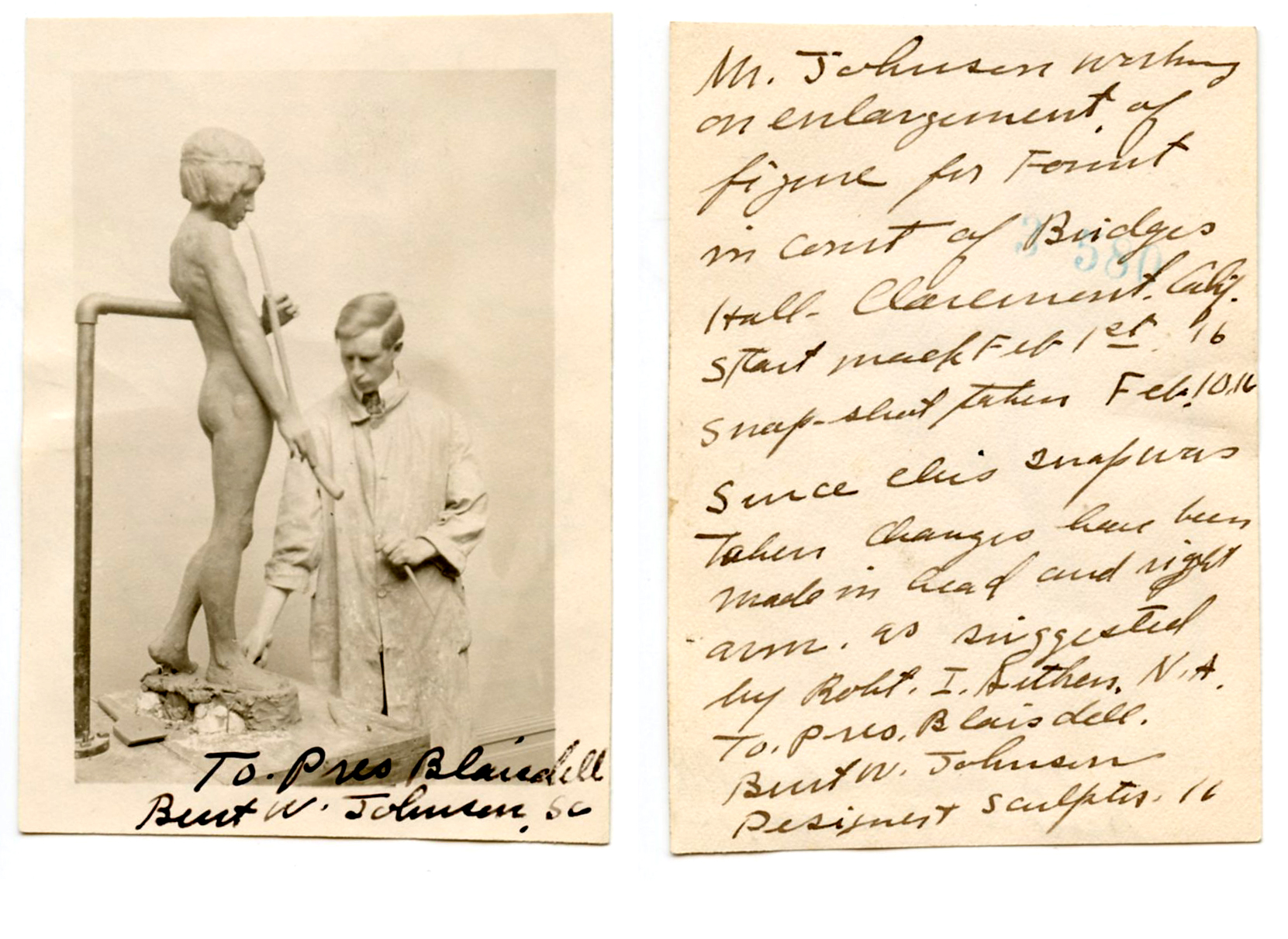
Burt W. Johnson, working in his studio in February, 1916 on the model for The Spirit of Spanish Music, in a snapshot inscribed for Pomona College Pres. Blaisdell and signed by the sculptor.

This style, and the fact that the building where it stands was intended for the study and performance of music, give the sculpture its name. (Other names for the sculpture sometimes are seen in various sources, including Pastoral Flutist and Youth).

The figure itself, a boy in "classic contrapposto stance" playing an elongated flute, was influenced by the 15th century Florentine sculptor Desiderio da Settignano It reflects the overall "Arcadian" theme Hunt intended for Pomona's south campus.

The sculpture's harmony with the building surrounding its courtyard setting was described in 1921 as "happily eloquent of the spirit of the place". "The pose is exquisite," reports another journal of the period, "and the design peculiarly appropriate to the Spanish architecture of the beautiful temple of music it is to adorn." In a lecture on the occasion of the Centennial in 2015 of the statue and the building, art historian George Gorse labels the setting "A Pastoral Theatre", and characterizes the sculpture as "Vergilian 'Arcadia' . . . absolutely Vergilian."

The sculpture was cast in bronze by the Gorham Company in Providence, R.I. It is life-size, approximately 137 cm (54 in.) in height. Before being delivered to Claremont and installed in Lebus Court, it was exhibited by the Gorham Company at their gallery on Fifth Avenue in New York, and at the Winter Exhibition at the National Academy.

After part of the fountain collapsed, the statue was removed in early 2015 while repairs were made. Before its return on 14 August 2015, The Spirit of Spanish Music was restored by conservator Donna Williams, including the repair of the boy's broken flute.

== Gallery ==
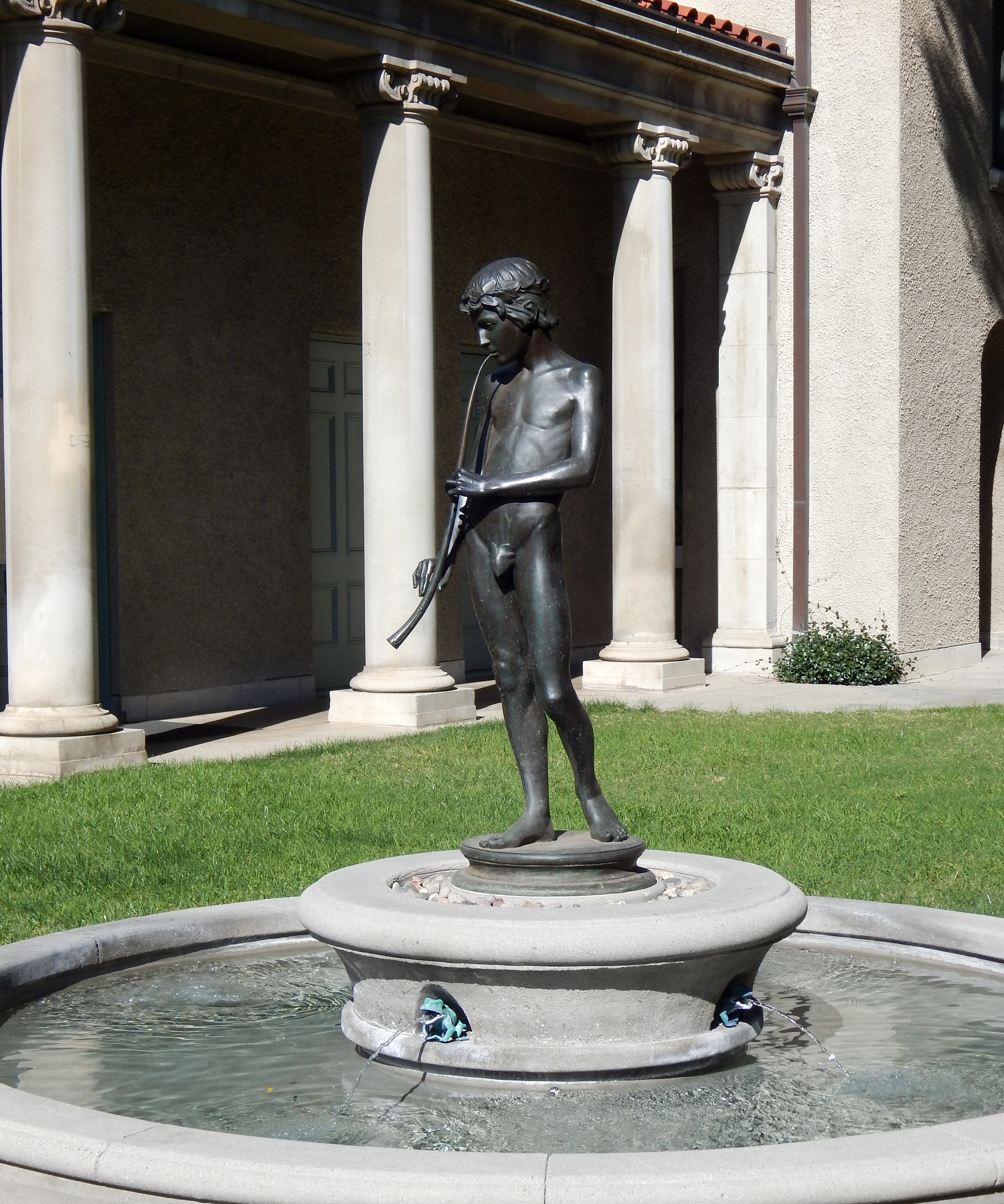
The sculpture and fountain after the 2015 restoration

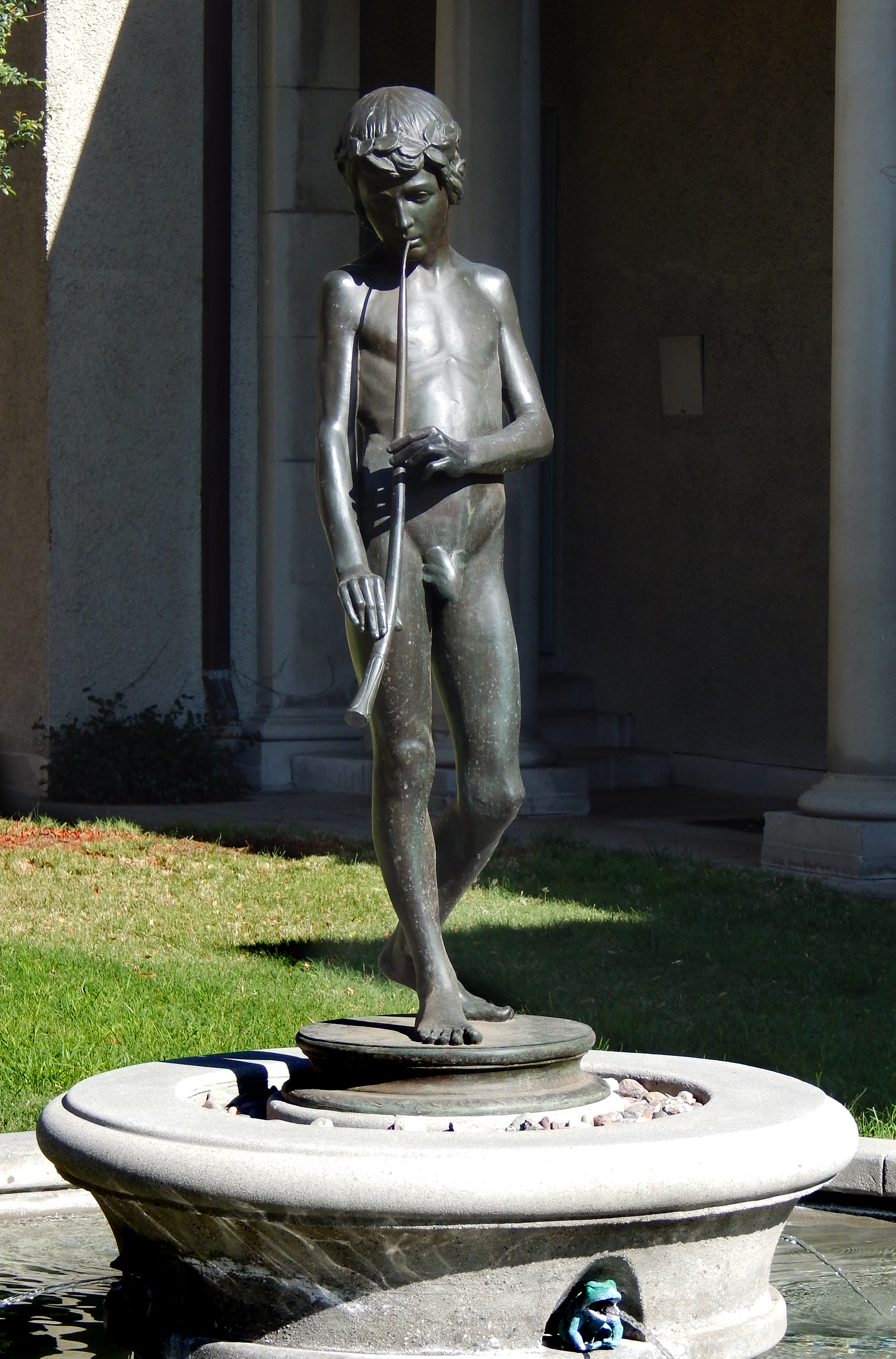
Close-up of the sculpture

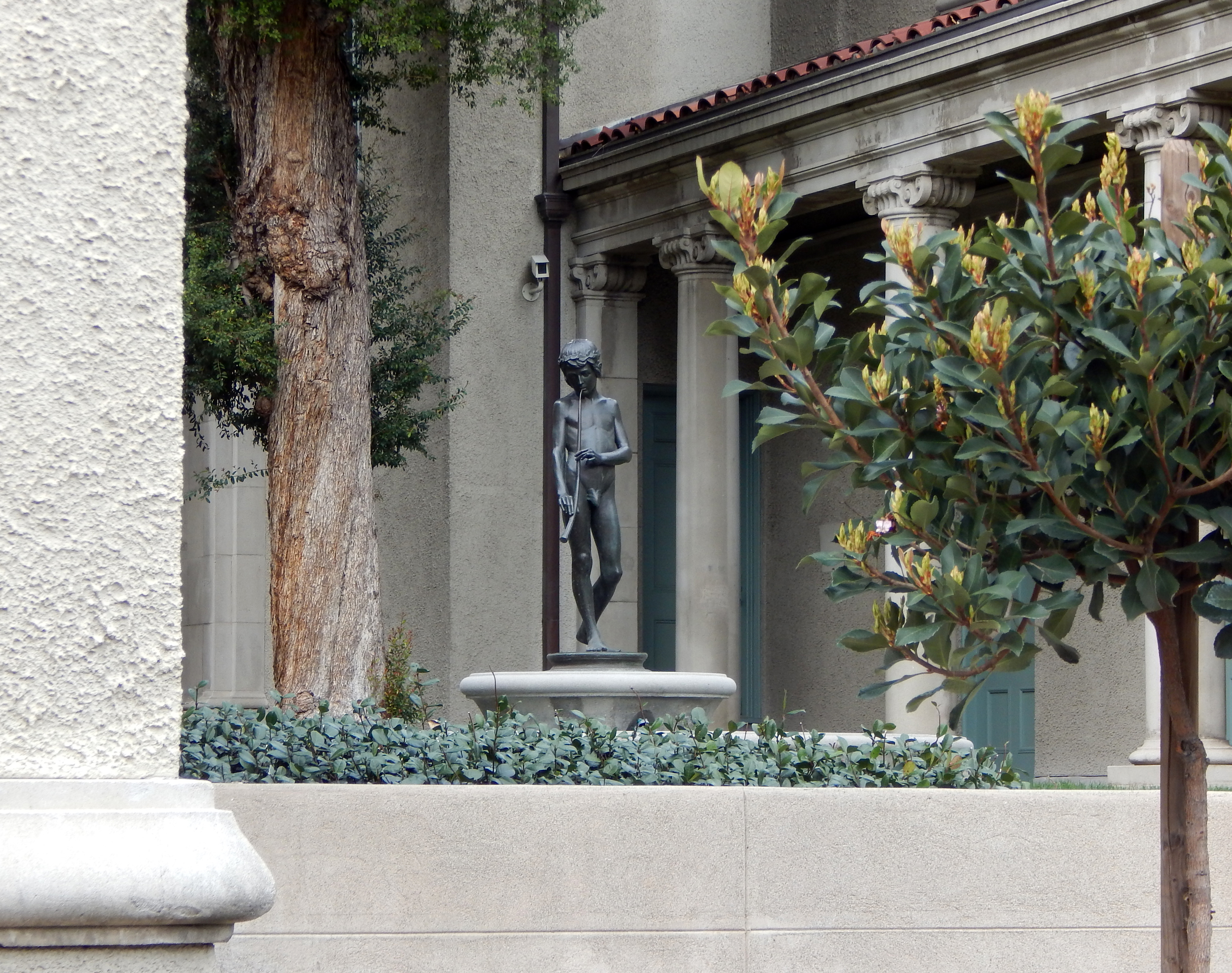
View looking into the court

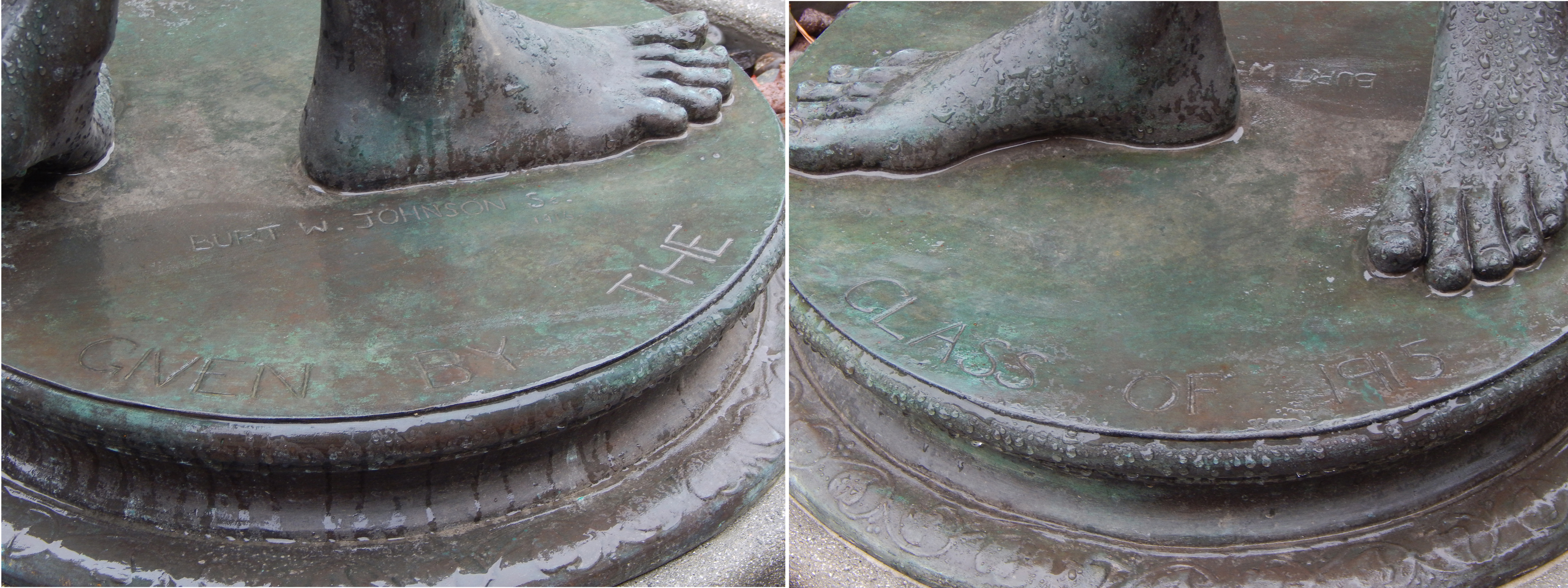
Inscriptions on the pedestal

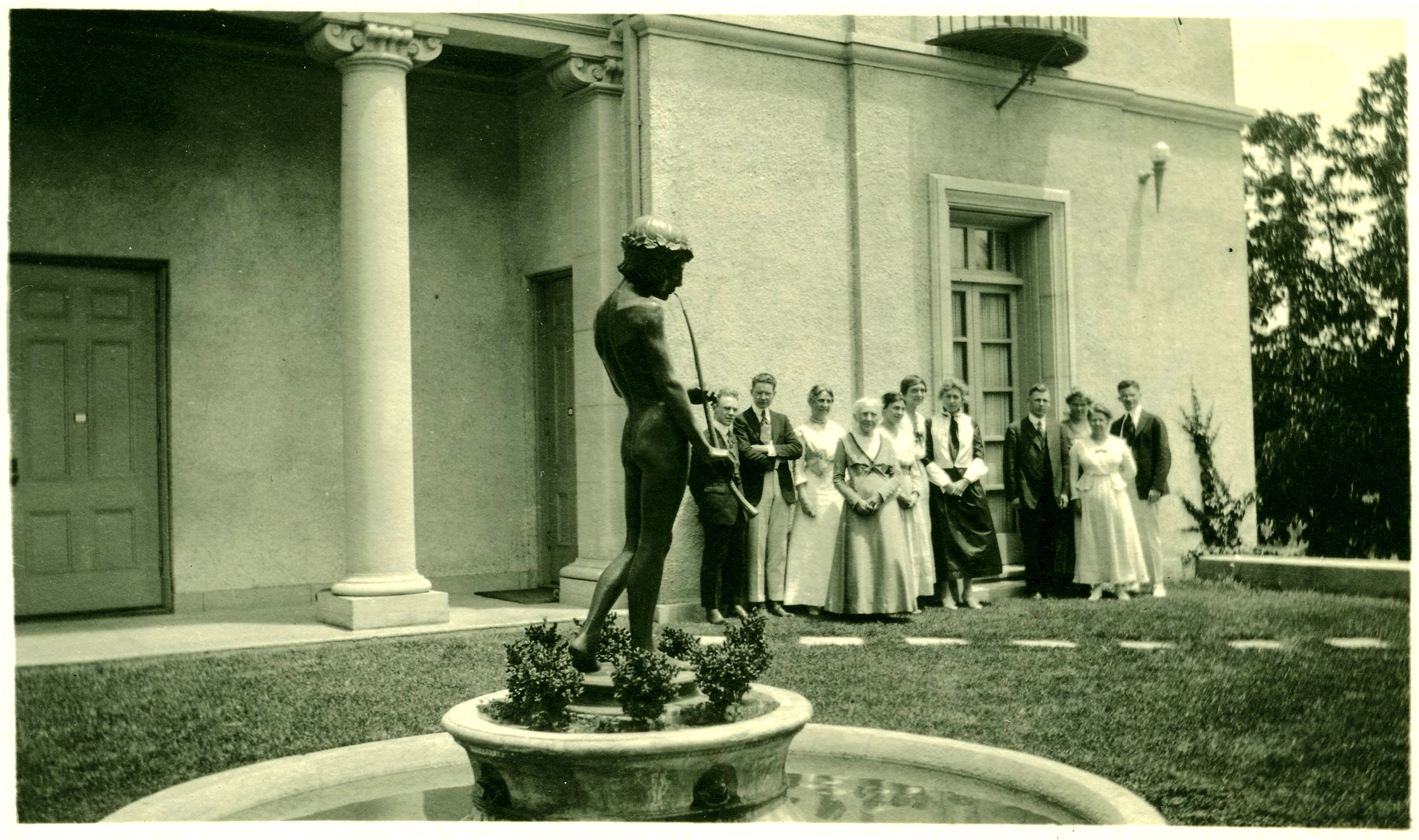
A small group of women and men view the sculpture, c. 1920

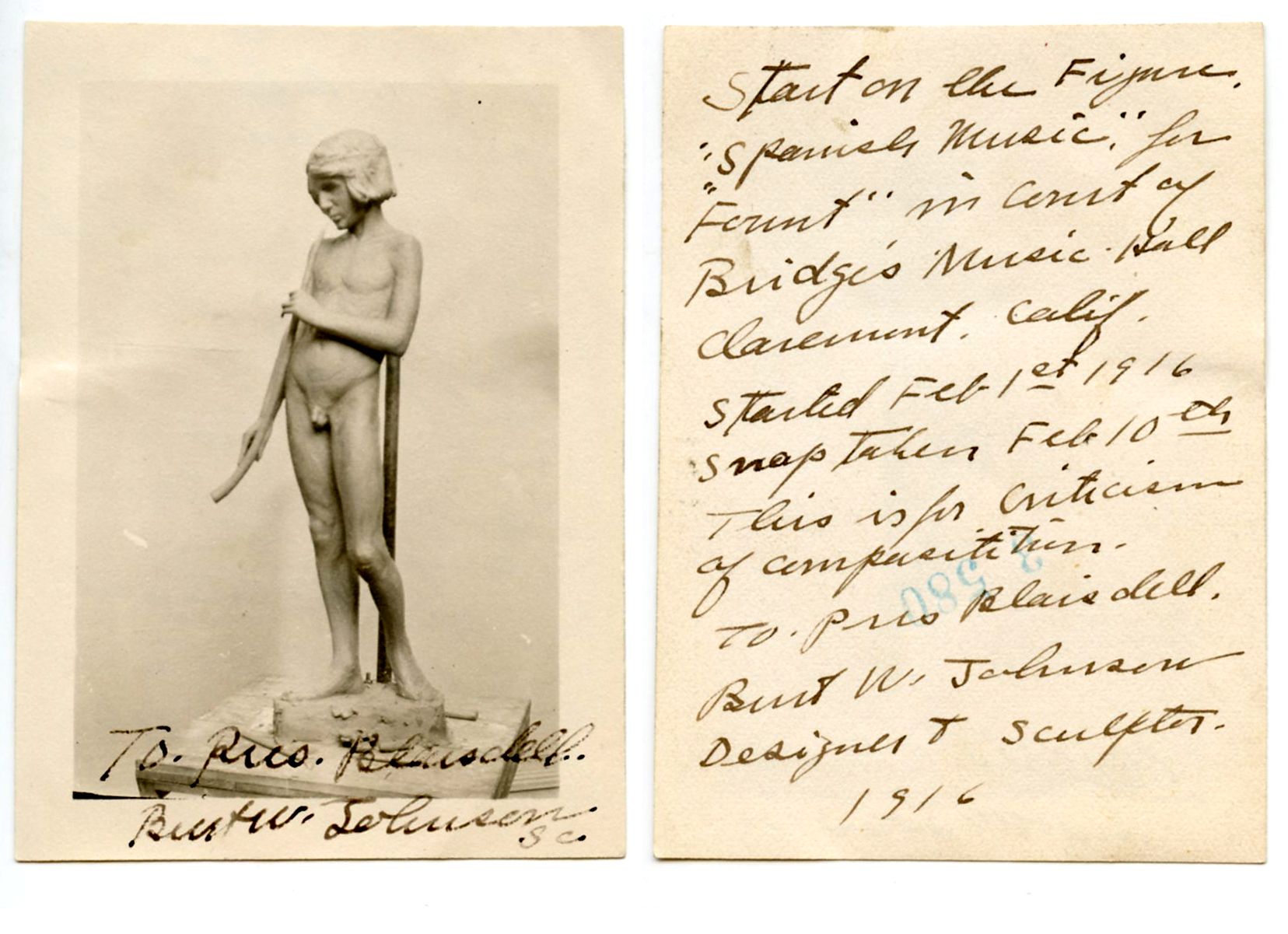
Studio snapshot of plaster working model of the sculpture

== See also ==
- Burt Johnson
- Dividing the Light, the Pomona College skyspace
- Prometheus (Ororzco), the mural in Pomona's Frary Dining Hall
