= Burt Johnson =

American sculptor

Burt William Johnson (April 25, 1890 – March 27, 1927) was an American sculptor.

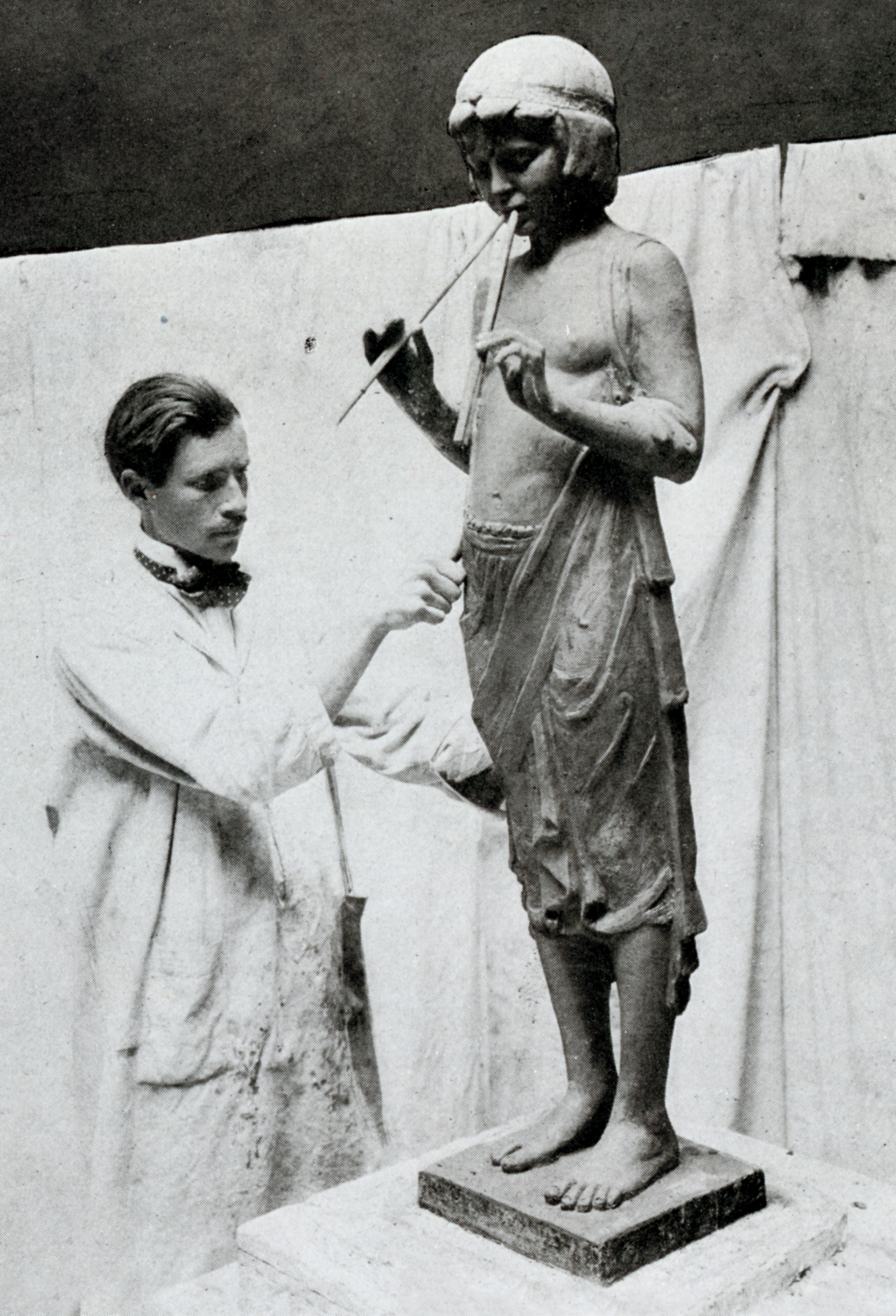
Burt W. Johnson working on The Piping Faun sculpture (1918) for Grauman's Theatre, Downtown Los Angeles, California, US.

== Biography ==
Johnson was born in Flint, Ohio. At the age of 13, he went to live for a year in Cornish, New Hampshire, where his older sister Annetta Johnson Saint-Gaudens, wife of sculptor Louis Saint-Gaudens, was studying with Louis' brother, master sculptor Augustus Saint-Gaudens. Johnson moved to Claremont, California in 1907 to study at Pomona College, and then to New York City in 1909 to study at the Art Students League of New York. He worked with fellow sculptors James Earle Fraser, Robert I. Aitken and George Bridgman, as well as his brother-in-law, Louis St. Gaudens. Back in California after Louis St. Gaudens' death in 1913, he moved into the studio that his brother-in-law had created during a visit to Claremont.

Johnson remained active in both California and New York, and is well known for his statues honoring American soldiers of World War I, known as doughboys. Examples of these doughboy statues can be found in DeWitt Clinton Park and Doughboy Park in New York City, the latter being named the best war memorial of its kind by the American Federation of Artists in 1928. Garfield Park in Pomona, California has another World War I tribute created by Johnson, dedicated in 1923, with an allegorical representation of Pomona, the Goddess of Fruit, beside a young man. The Children's Tribute to the World War Heroes (1919) in Robert Keller Park in Huntington Park, California, depicts a barefoot girl holding the uniform caps of a sailor and a doughboy to her heart.

Among his earlier works is The Spirit of Spanish Music, a fountain with the bronze figure of a boy playing a flute, located in Lebus Court of the Mabel Shaw Bridges Hall of Music at Pomona College. His allegorical figures of Architecture and Sculpture decorate the exterior of the 1927 Fine Arts Building (Los Angeles), with additional reliefs near the top of the building's façade. The inside lobby has a fountain with sculptures of children, modeled by his daughter, Cynthia (age 3) and his son Harvey (age 5). That son, Harvey W. Johnson (1921–2005), was a prominent Western artist and became president of the Cowboy Artists of America. In addition, Johnson's grandsons Casey Schwarz and Scott Lee Johnson continue the family involvement in sculpture. There is also a granddaughter, Darcy Lynn a painter, and a great granddaughter, Tamsin Parker, a painter and animator.

In 1918, Johnson was a leading candidate to execute a memorial to community leader and publisher of the Los Angeles Times, Gen. Harrison Gray Otis,. who had died the year before. The Los Angeles Evening Herald called him a "100 per cent American sculptor", and pictured him "putting the finishing touches" on his model for the memorial in a story announcing that the project would be delayed until after the conclusion of the World War, since the amount of bronze needed to complete the work "would be sufficient to construct two cannon". The project ultimately was awarded to Russian sculptor Prince Paul Troubetzkoy

For his final project, the façade and lobby sculptures of the Los Angeles Fine Arts Building, Johnson's sister, Annetta Johnson Saint-Gaudens, and her son Paul St Gaudens, both sculptors themselves, provided assistance, as did Santa Monica, California sculptor Merrell Gage. In his final years, feeling he wanted to work on something creative and not concentrate just on sculpture, Johnson wrote a novel about an artist's life in Greenwich Village, New York City.

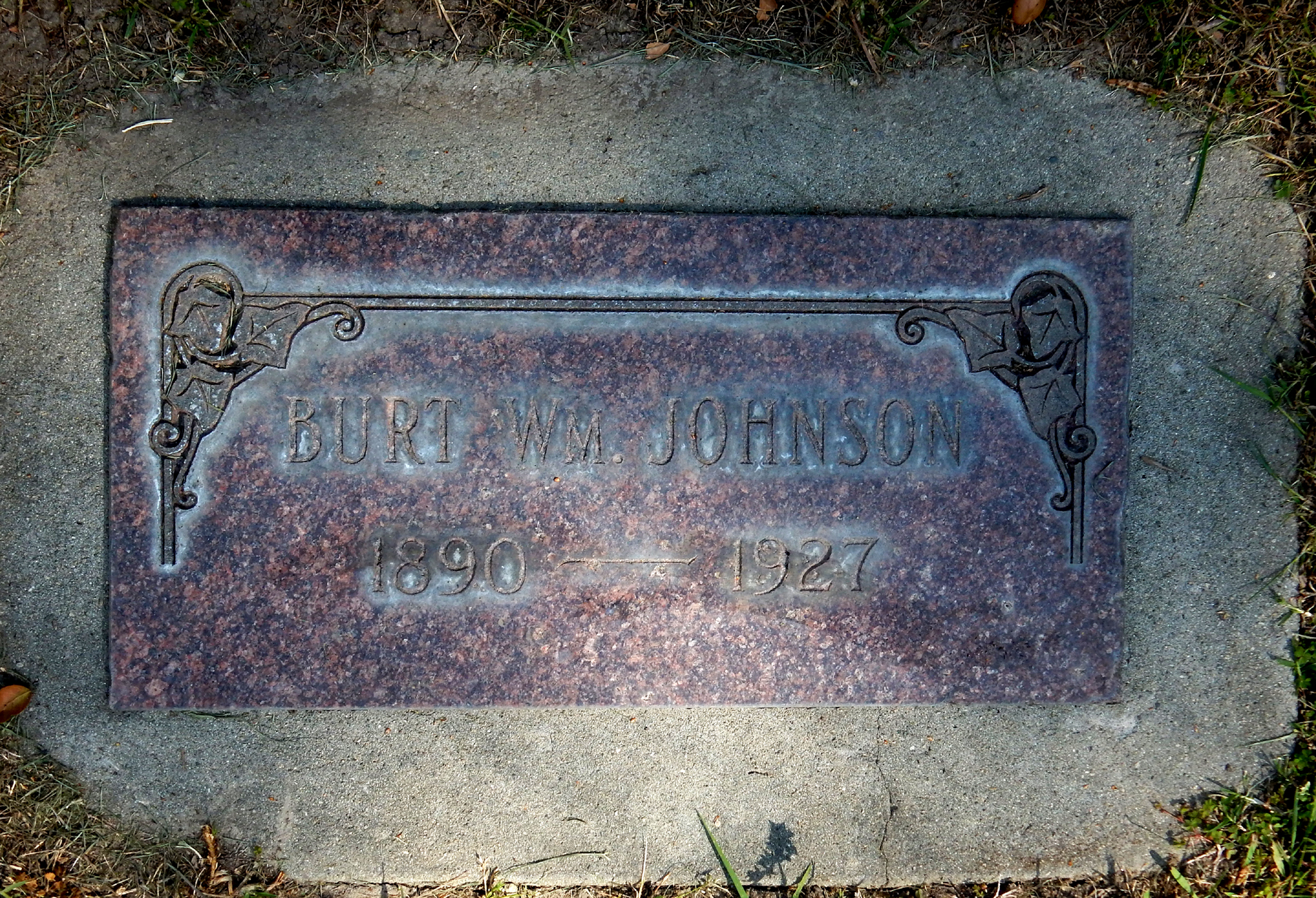
Burt W. Johnson's grave stone

Burt Johnson died in Claremont, California, on March 27, 1927, at the age of 36. He is buried next to his wife Ottilie M. Johnson (1891–1980) in Oak Park Cemetery, Claremont, California, USA.

== Selected works ==
=== Location known ===
- The Spirit of Spanish Music (1916) Pomona College, Claremont, California, US
- Albert John Cook memorial tablet (1917) Pomona College Museum of Art
- Greek Theater commemorative tablet (dedicated 1917) Pomona College Museum of Art
- Children's Tribute to the World War Heroes (1919) Robert Keller Park, Huntington Park, California, US
- Elisha Newton Dimick Memorial (1921) Palm Beach, Florida, US
- World War Memorial Panel College Park, Georgia
- Portrait bust (c.1921) of Dr Henry Kingman (1864–1921), early pastor Congregational Church, Claremont, California, US
- Theodore Edwin Norton Memorial Fountain and Tablet (1922) Pomona College, Claremont, California, US
- Anna I. Young Memorial Panel (1923) Anna I. Young Alumnae House, Agnes Scott College, Decatur, Georgia, US
- Pomona World War I Memorial (Goddess of Fruit) (1923) Garfield Park, Pomona, California, US
- Doughboy Monument (1923) Doughboy Plaza, Queens (Woodside), New York, US
- The Returned Soldier (1923) Lancaster Avenue and Locust Street, Columbia, Pennsylvania, US
- Lobby and façade sculptures (1926) Fine Arts Building, Los Angeles, California, US
- Flanders Field Doughboy (1927, dedicated 1930) De Witt Clinton Park, New York City

=== Location unknown ===
- The Little Director (1916) Mr and Mrs A.S. Bridges family garden, San Diego, California, US
- Hope Braithwaite Smith memorial tablet (1917) Hope Braithwaite Smith Memorial Reading Room, Library (demolished), Pomona College, Claremont, California, US
- Christ Panel (April 1917) St Francis Hospital, La Crosse, Wisconsin
- Piping Faun, sculpture in front of the organ screen, right side of the proscenium, in Grauman's "Million Dollar" Theatre (1918) Los Angeles, California, US
- The Answering Note Garden of Wm. G. Mather, Esq., Pasadena, California, US
- Little Sculptor Boy, at one time in Lobby of the Fine Arts Building, Los Angeles, California (c.1927)

== Gallery ==
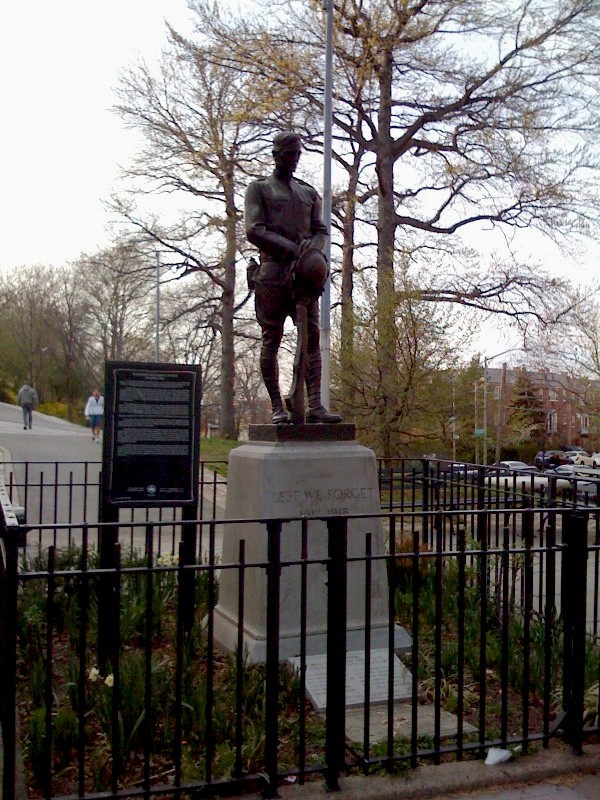
Statue at Doughboy Park in Woodside, Queens

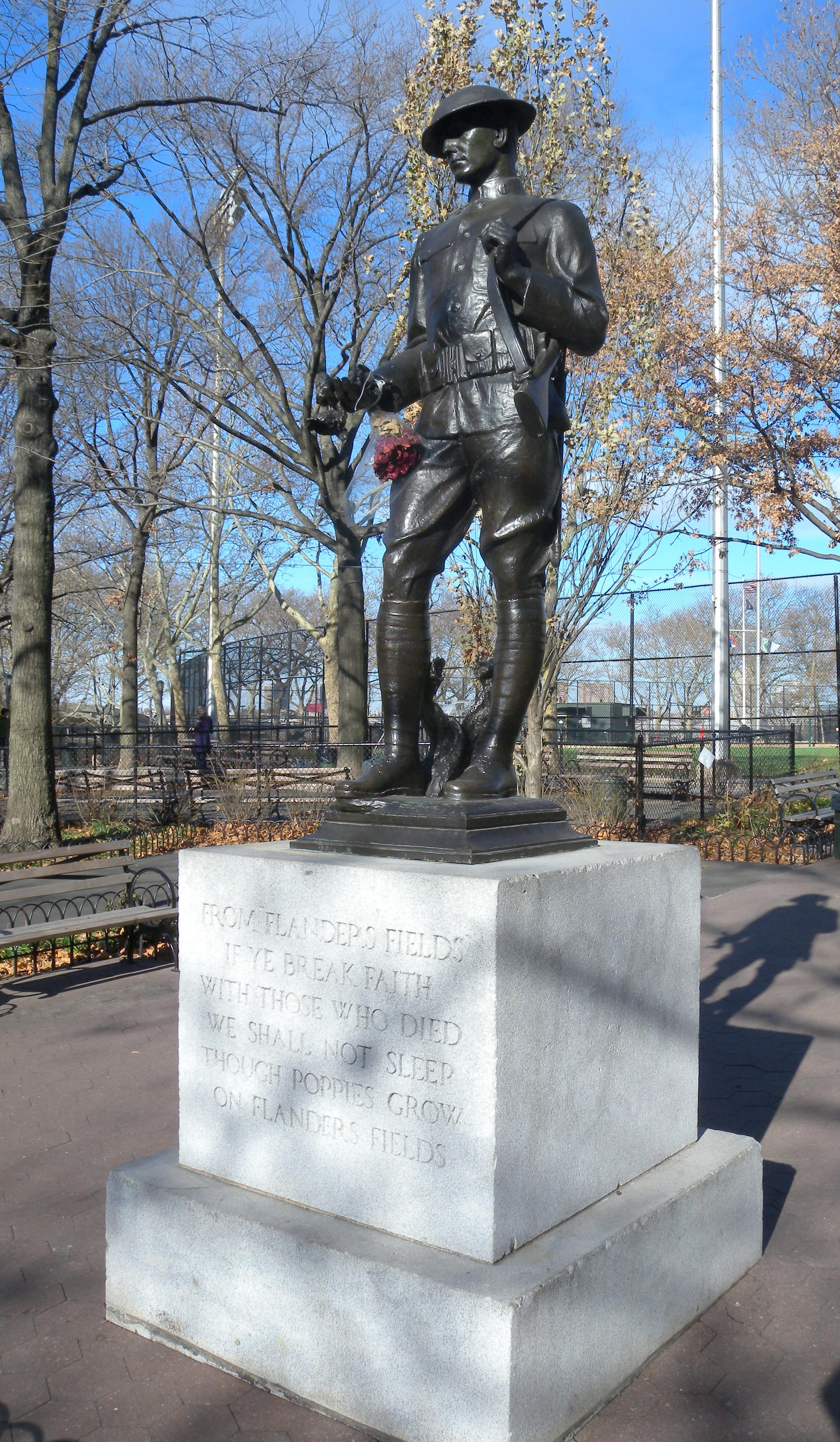
DeWitt Clinton Park in Manhattan also has a doughboy statue

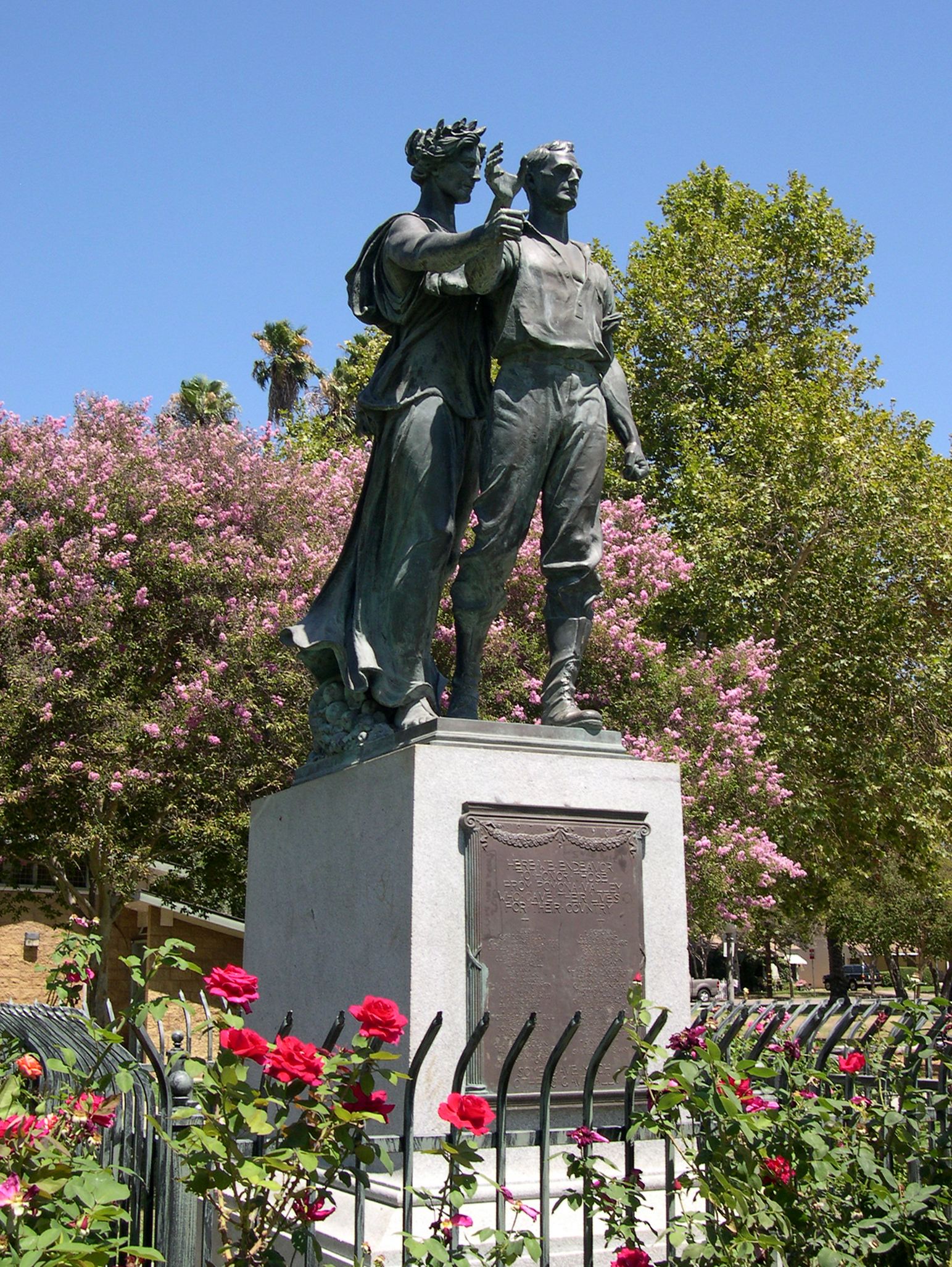
Goddess of Fruit World War I memorial in Garfield Park, Pomona, California

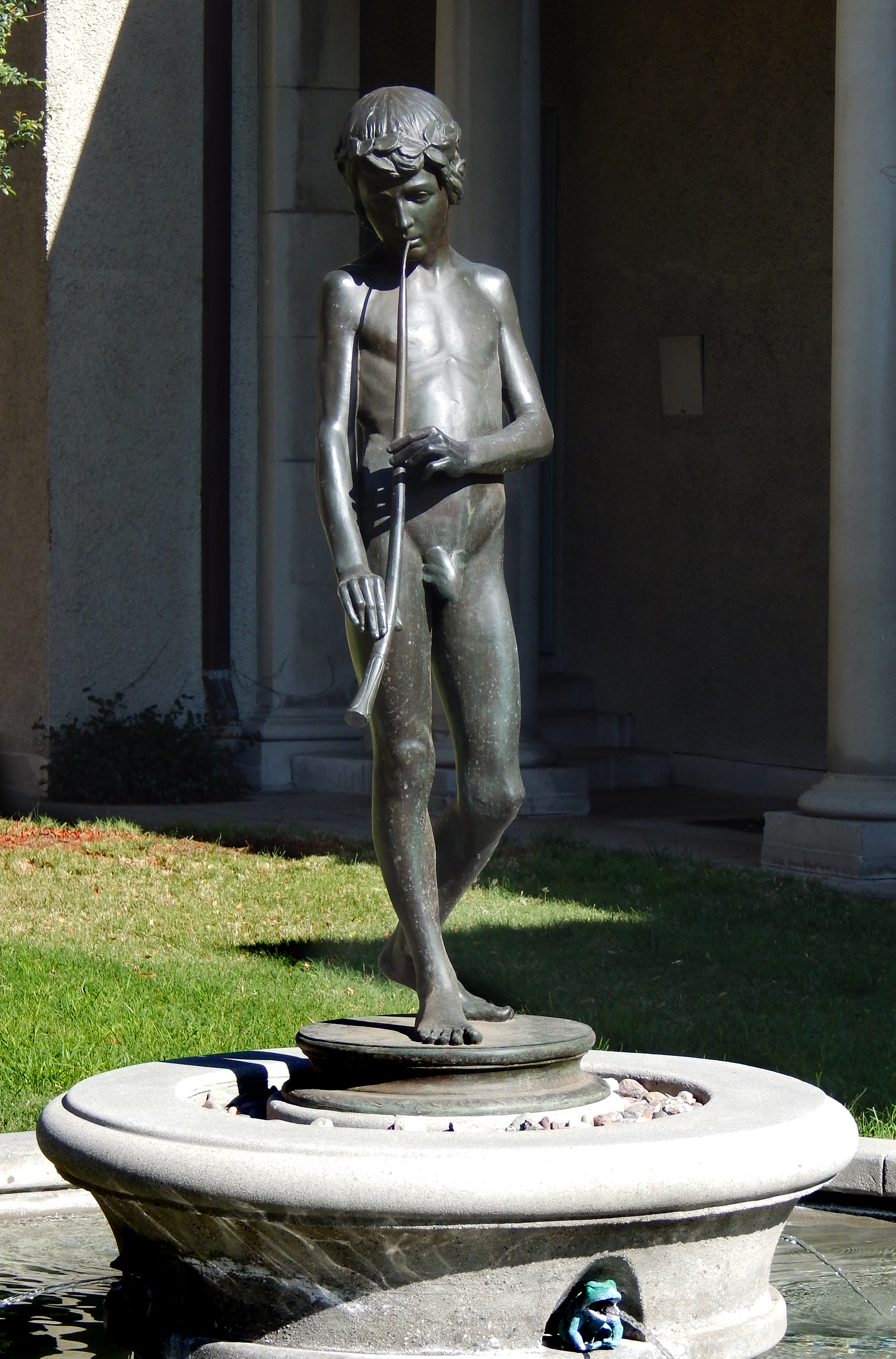
The Spirit of Spanish Music (aka Pastoral Flutist) was commissioned by the Pomona College Class of 1915, installed in 1916 and restored in 2015

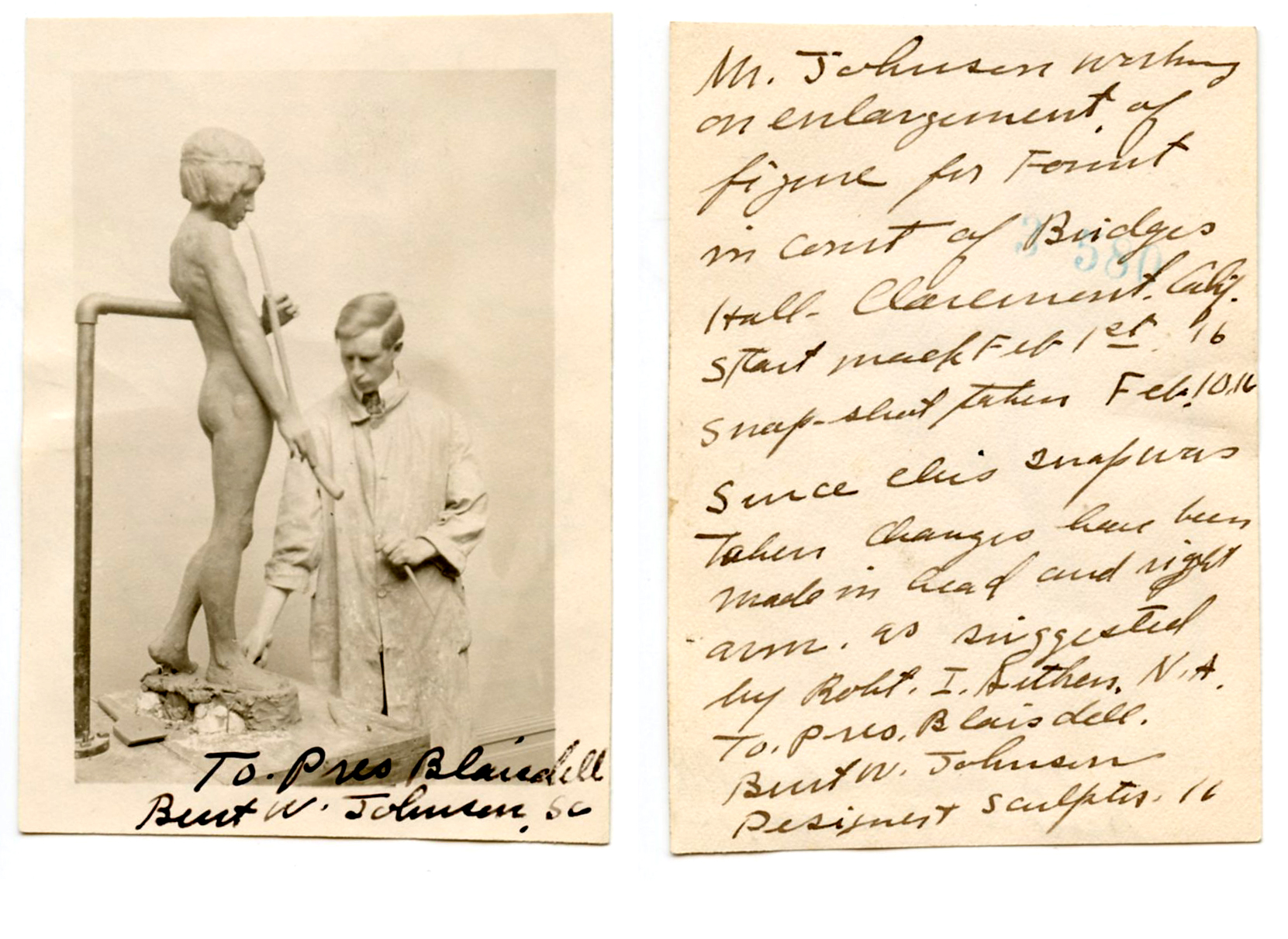
studio snapshot of Burt W. Johnson, working on his plaster model of The Spirit of Spanish Music (1916)

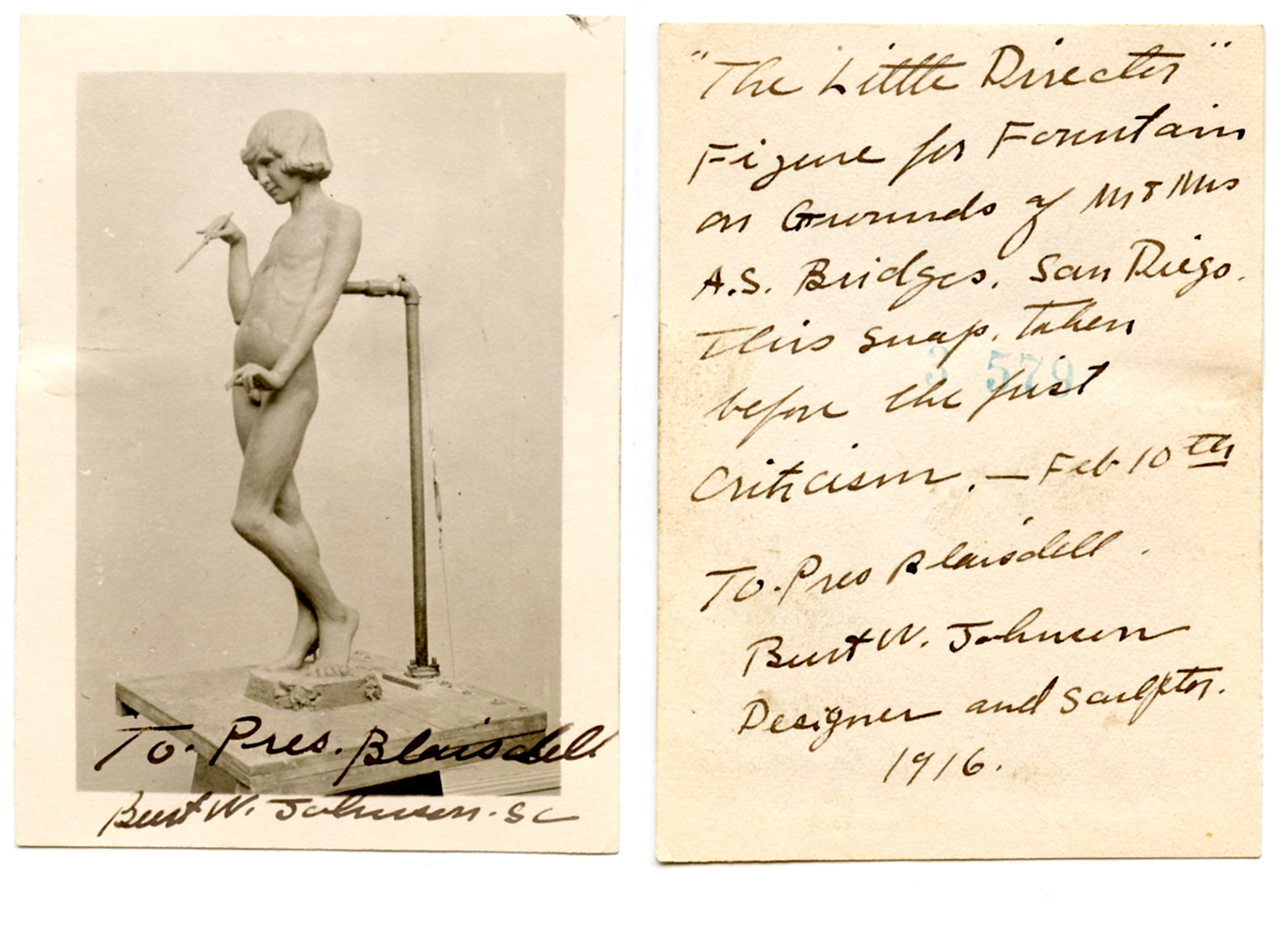
studio snapshot of working model of The Little Director, sculpture for the San Diego (California) home of Mr and Mrs A.S. Bridges (1916)

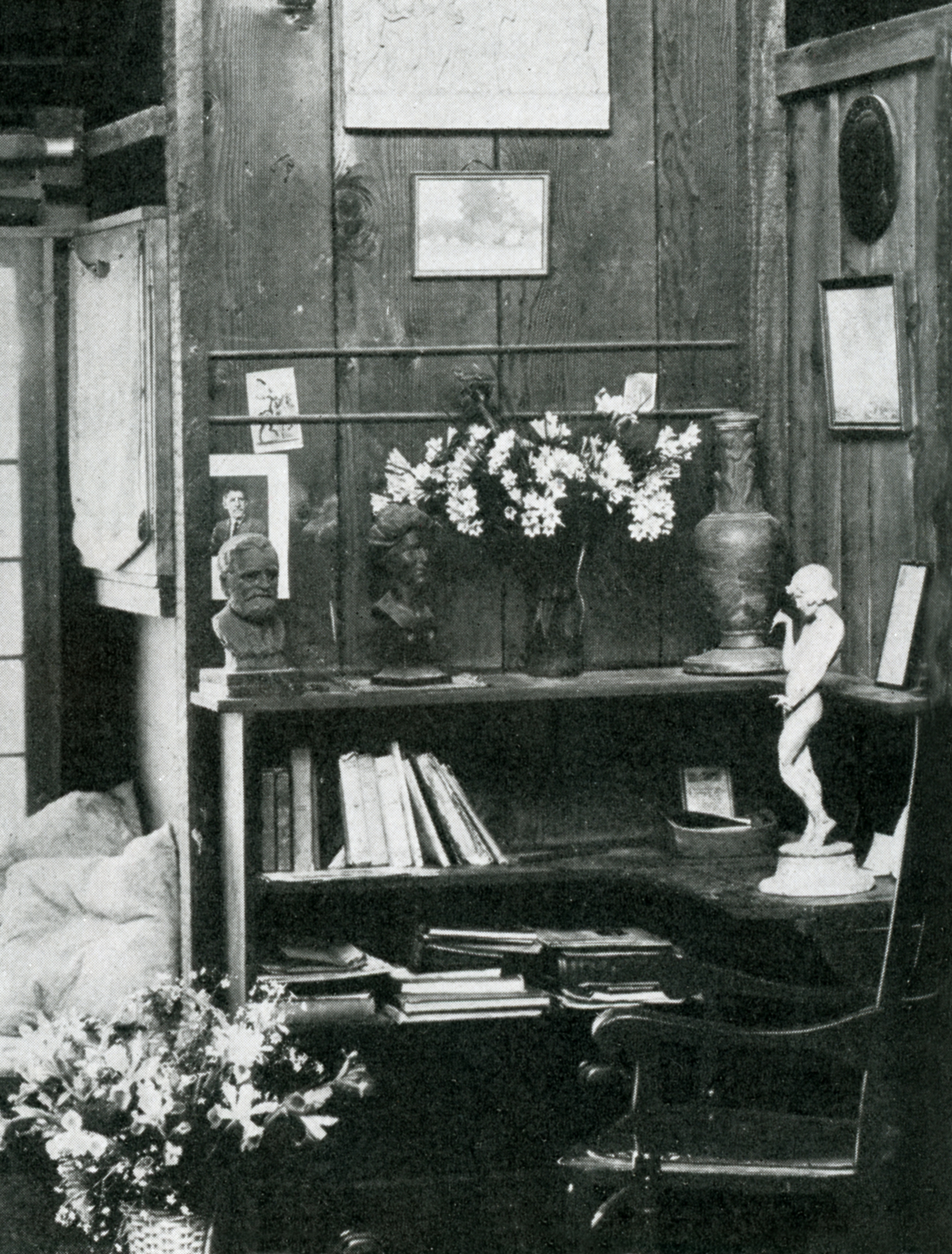
Johnson's studio in Claremont, California, with miniature of The Little Director at right of desk

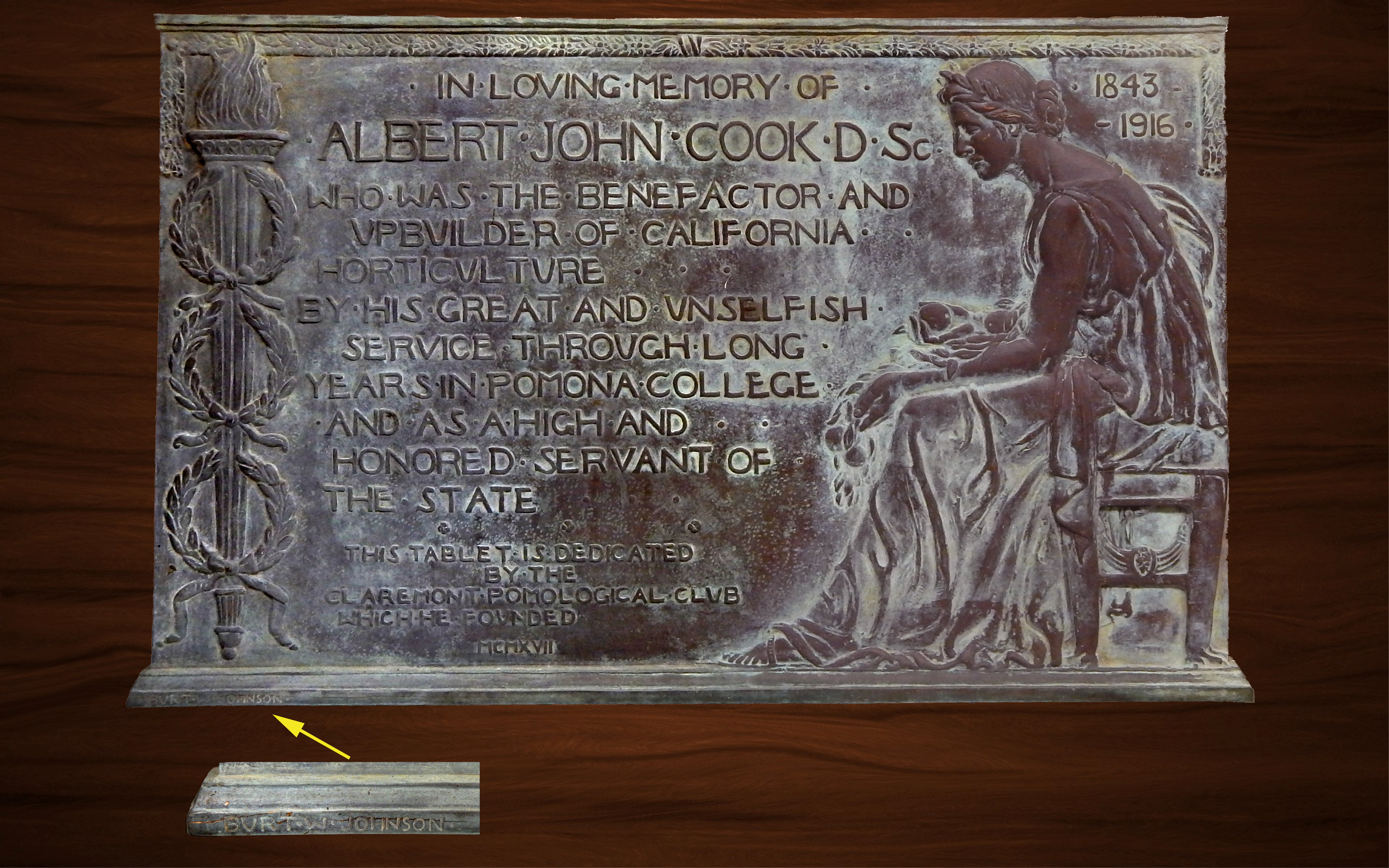
Cook Memorial Tablet (1917), Pomona College Museum of Art, Claremont, California

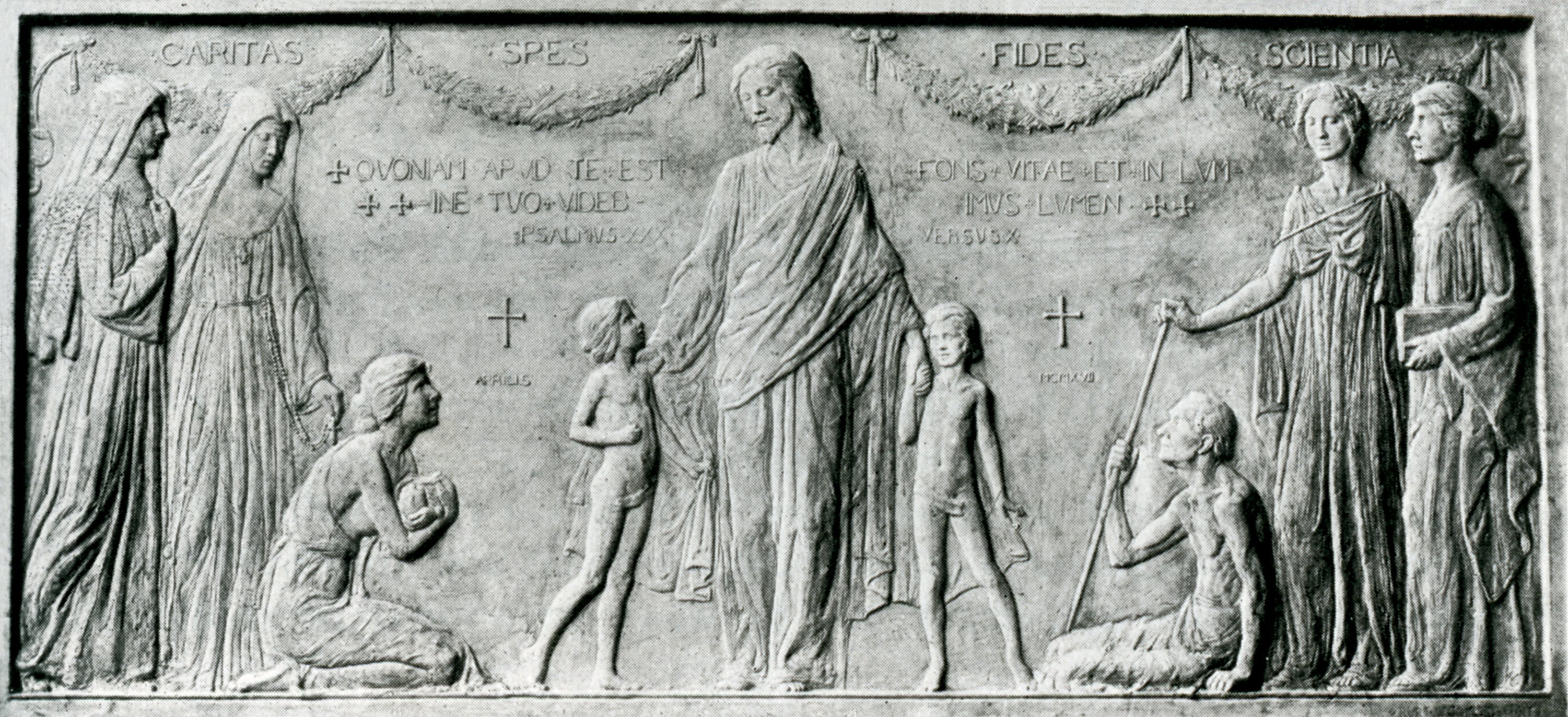
Christ Panel (April 1917), St Francis Hospital, La Crosse, Wisconsin

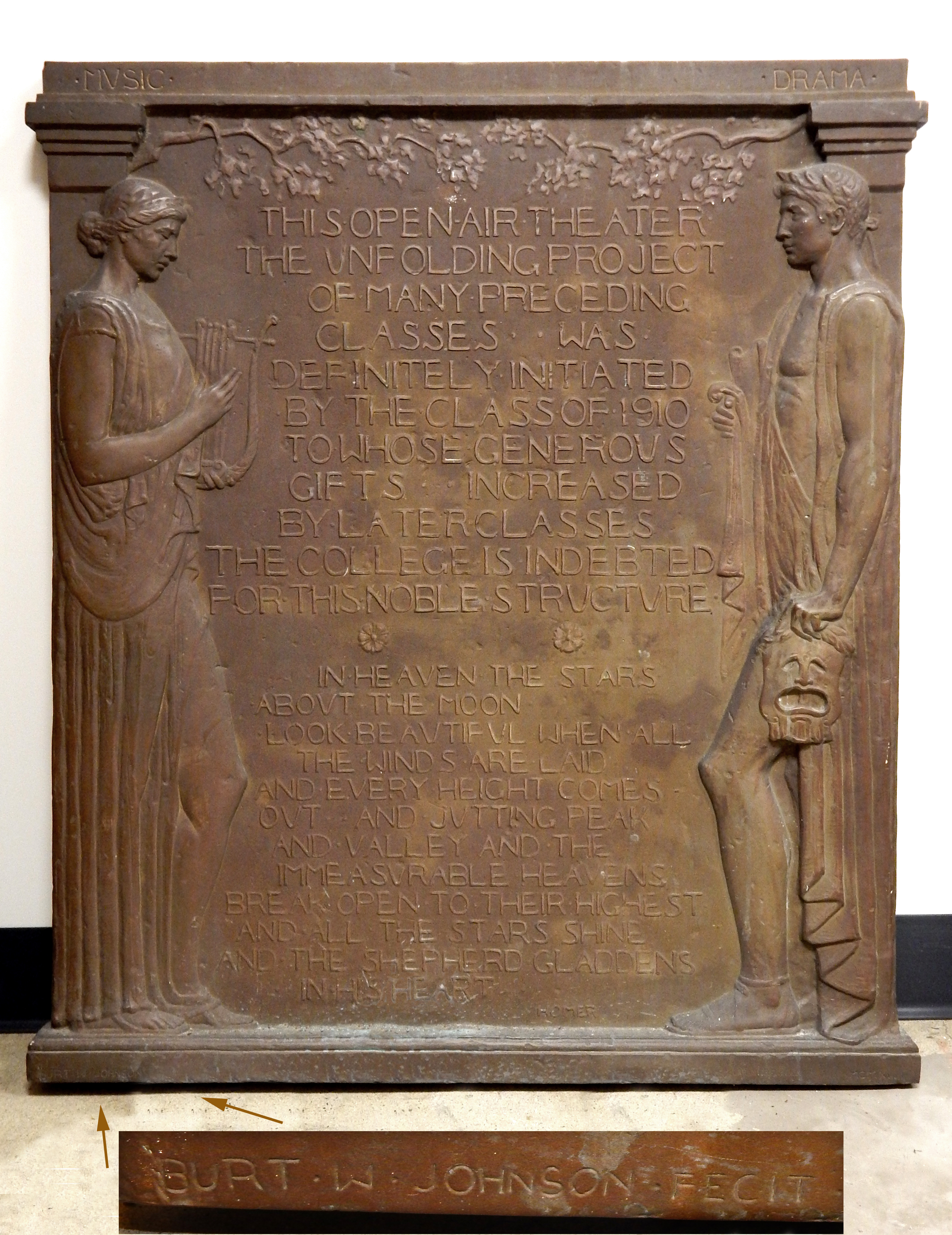
Greek Theater Tablet (dedicated 1917), Pomona College Museum of Art, Claremont, California

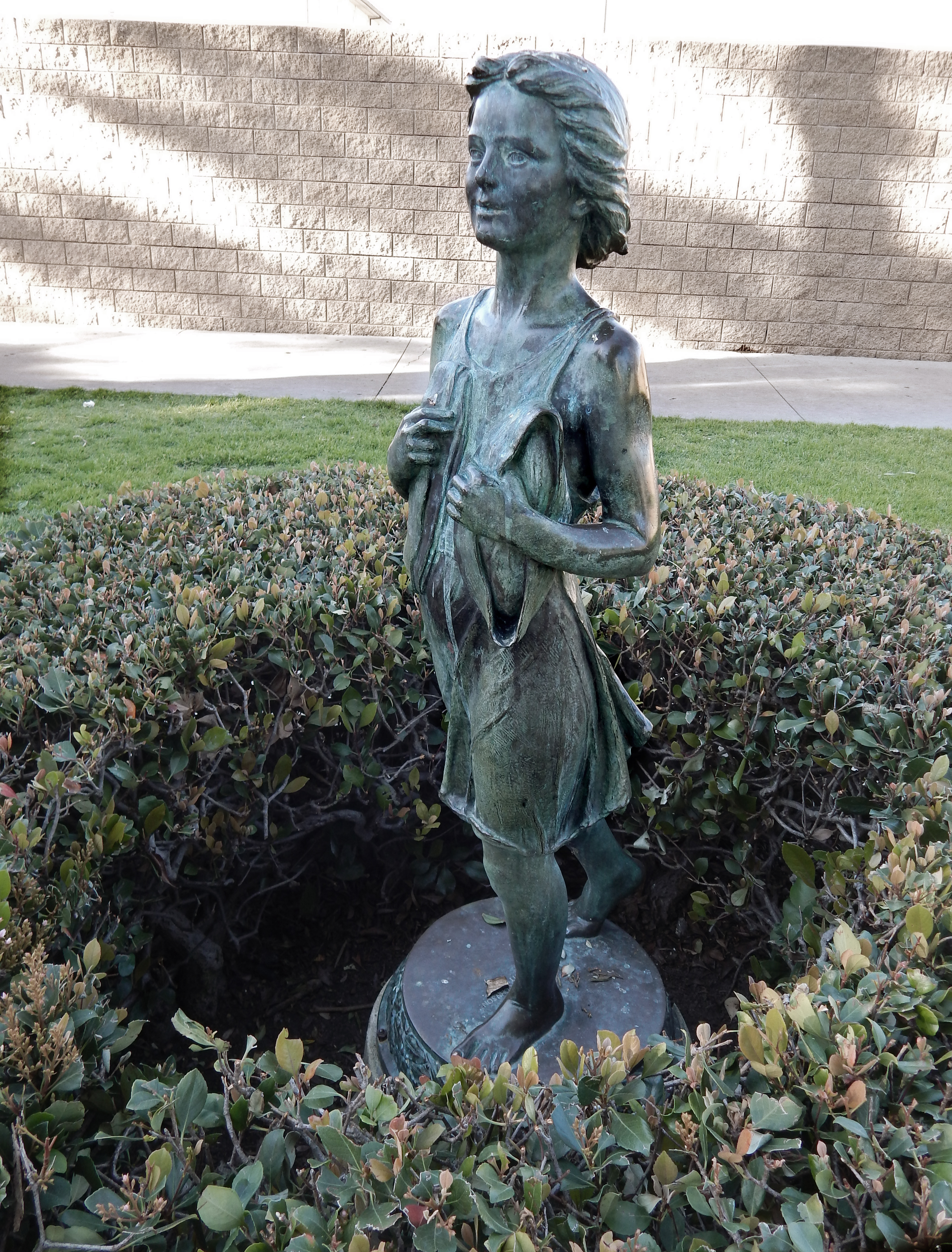
Children's Tribute to the World War Heroes (1919), Huntington Park, California

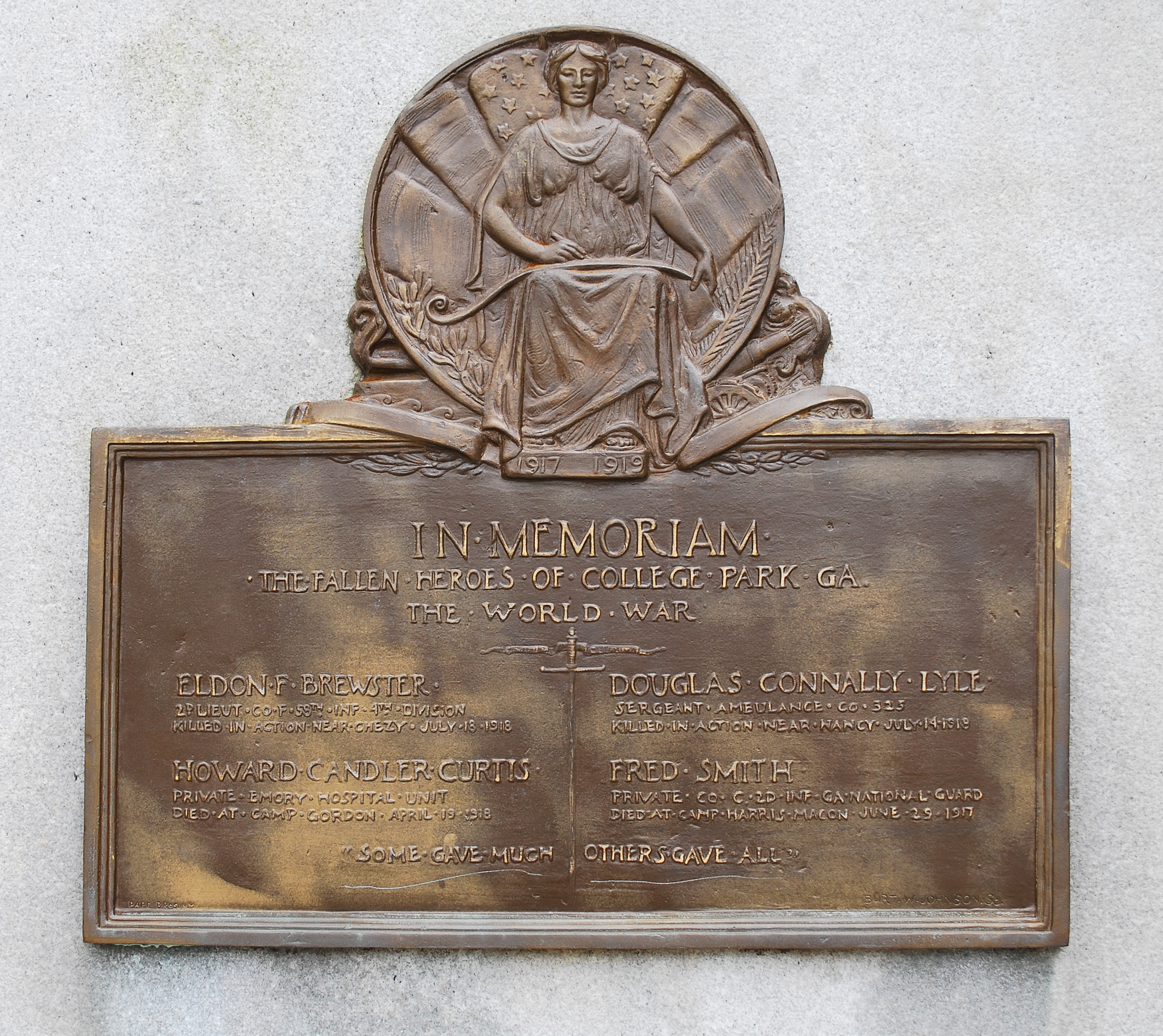
World War I memorial plaque, College Park, Georgia (1921)

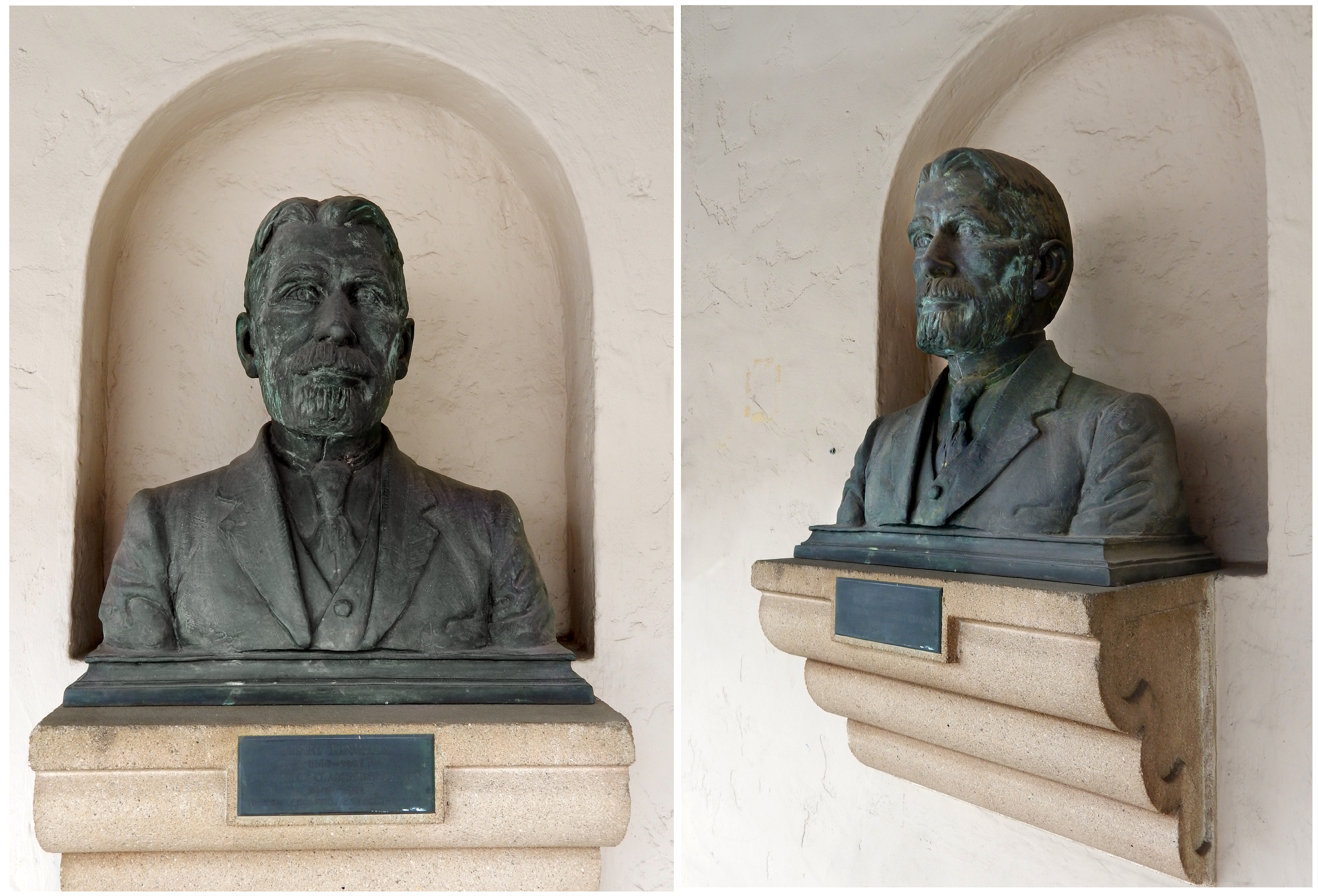
Portrait bust of Dr Henry Kingman (c.1921), United Church of Christ, Claremont, California, US

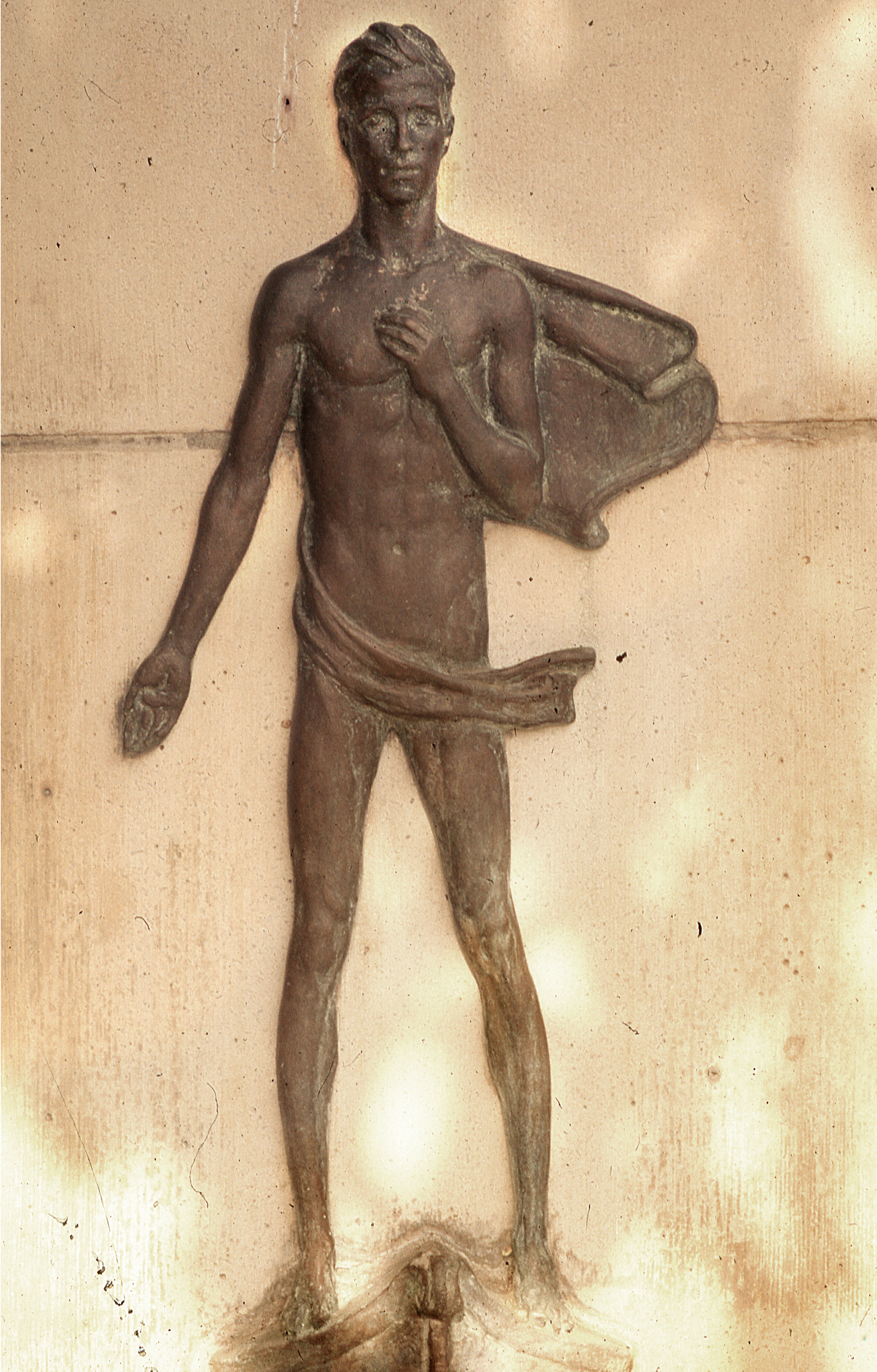
Theodore Edwin Norton Memorial Fountain (1922, detail), Pomona College, Claremont, California

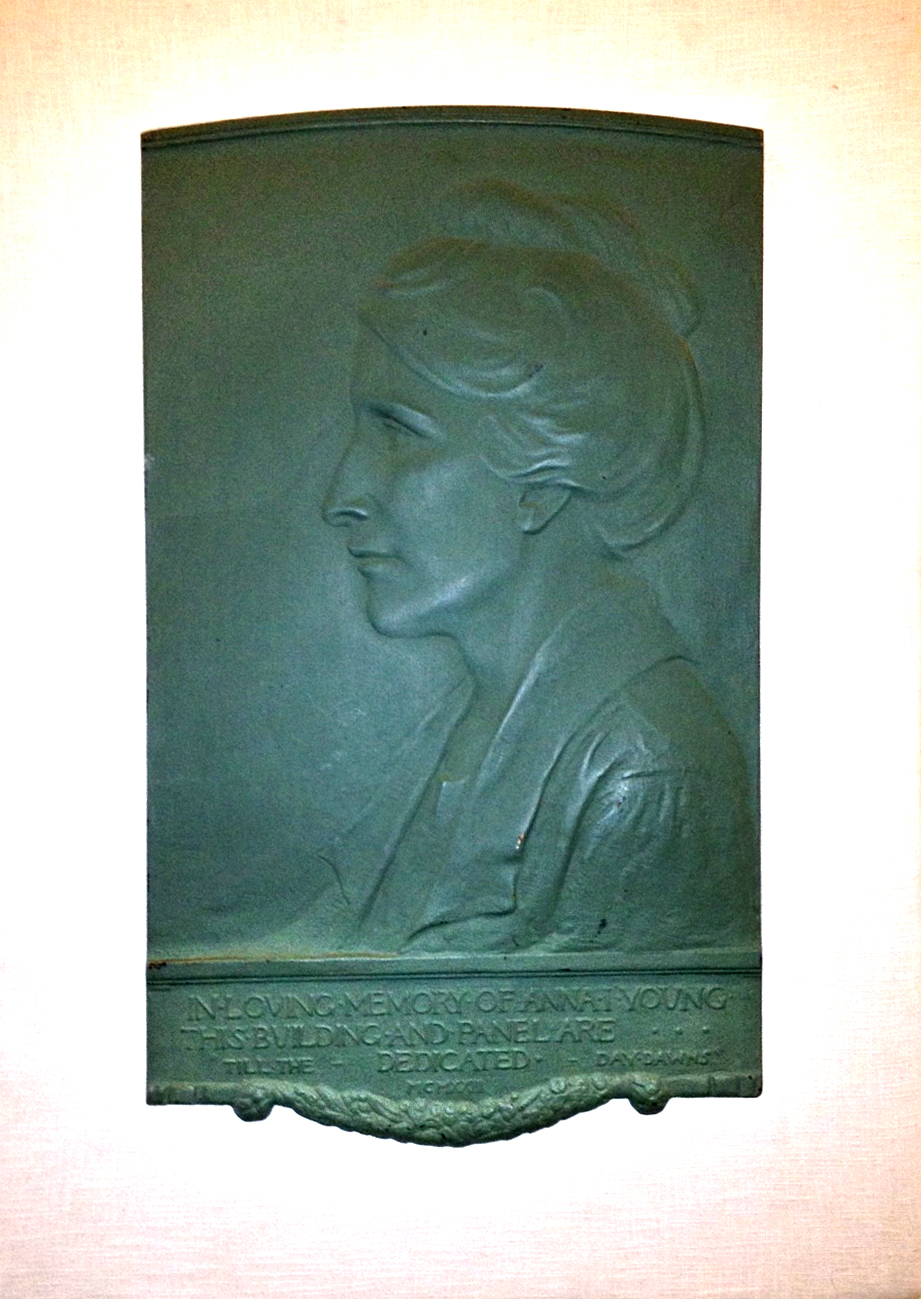
Memorial plaque for Anna I. Young (1923), Agnes Scott College, Decatur, Georgia, US

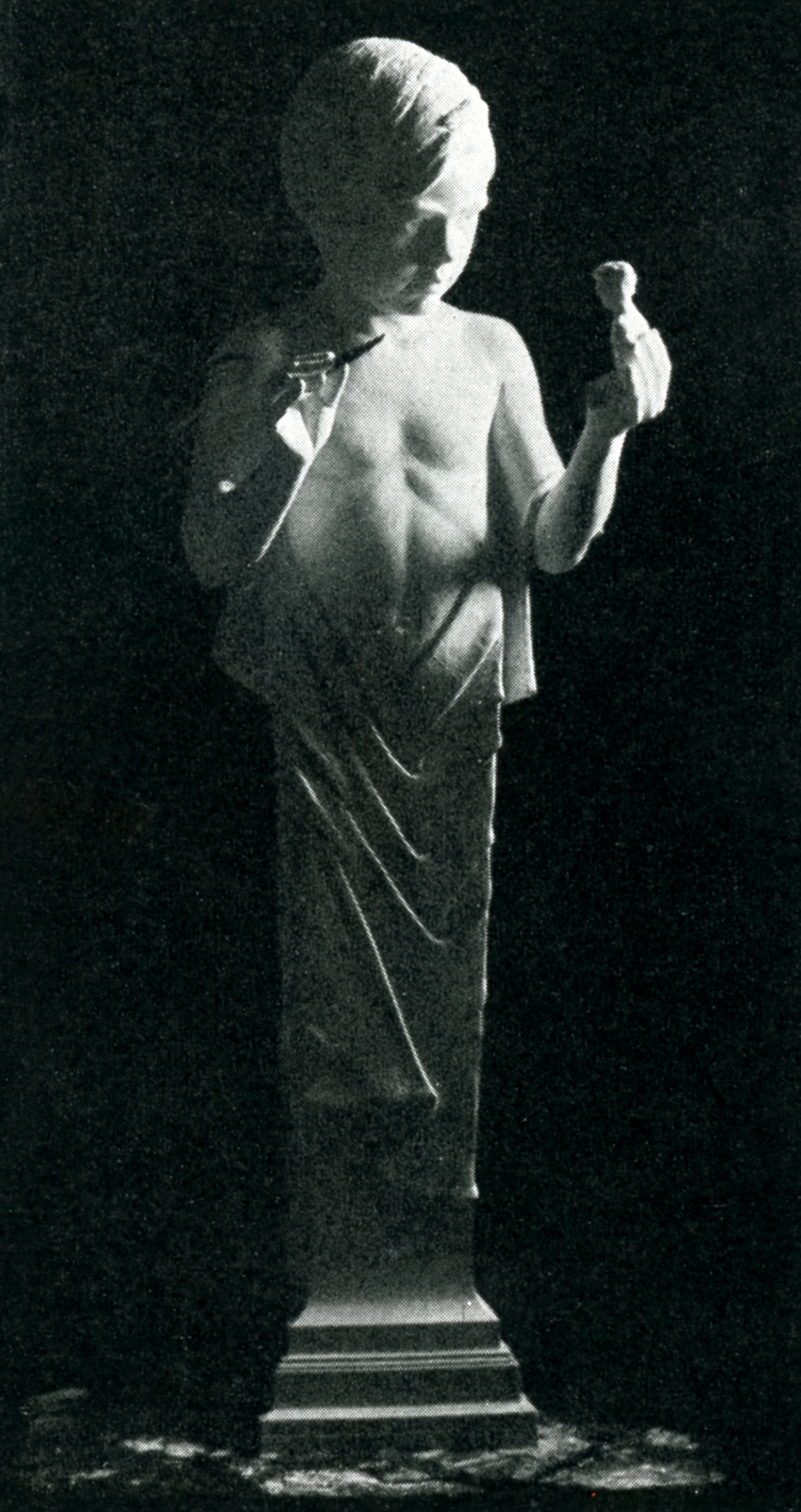
Little Sculptor Boy, at one time in Lobby of Fine Arts Building, Los Angeles, California (c.1927)

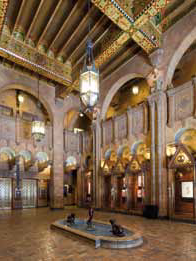
Fountain sculpture group in Lobby of The Fine Arts Building, Los Angeles

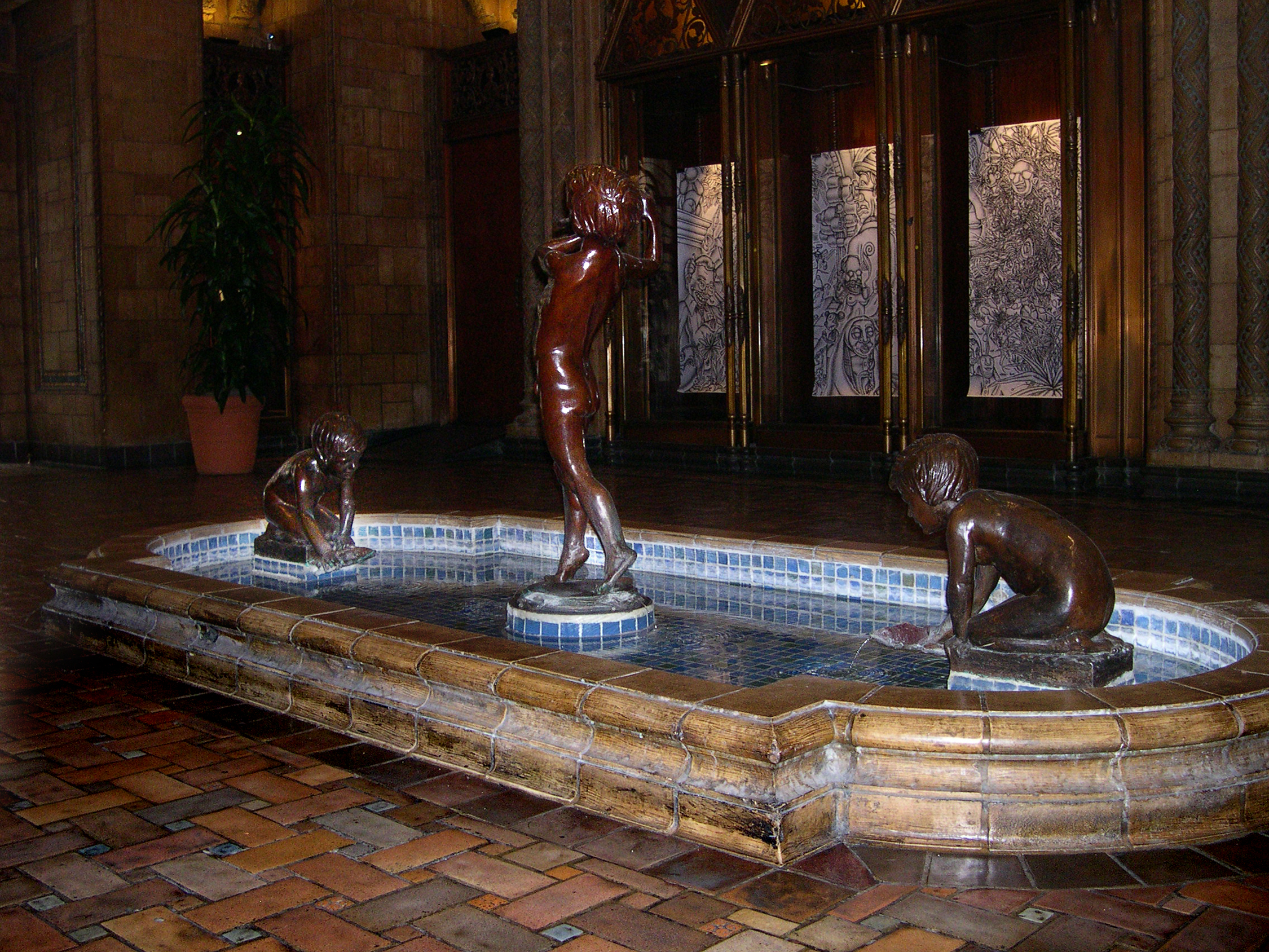
Fountain sculptures, including The High Note (1926), Lobby of the Fine Arts Building, 7th Street, Los Angeles

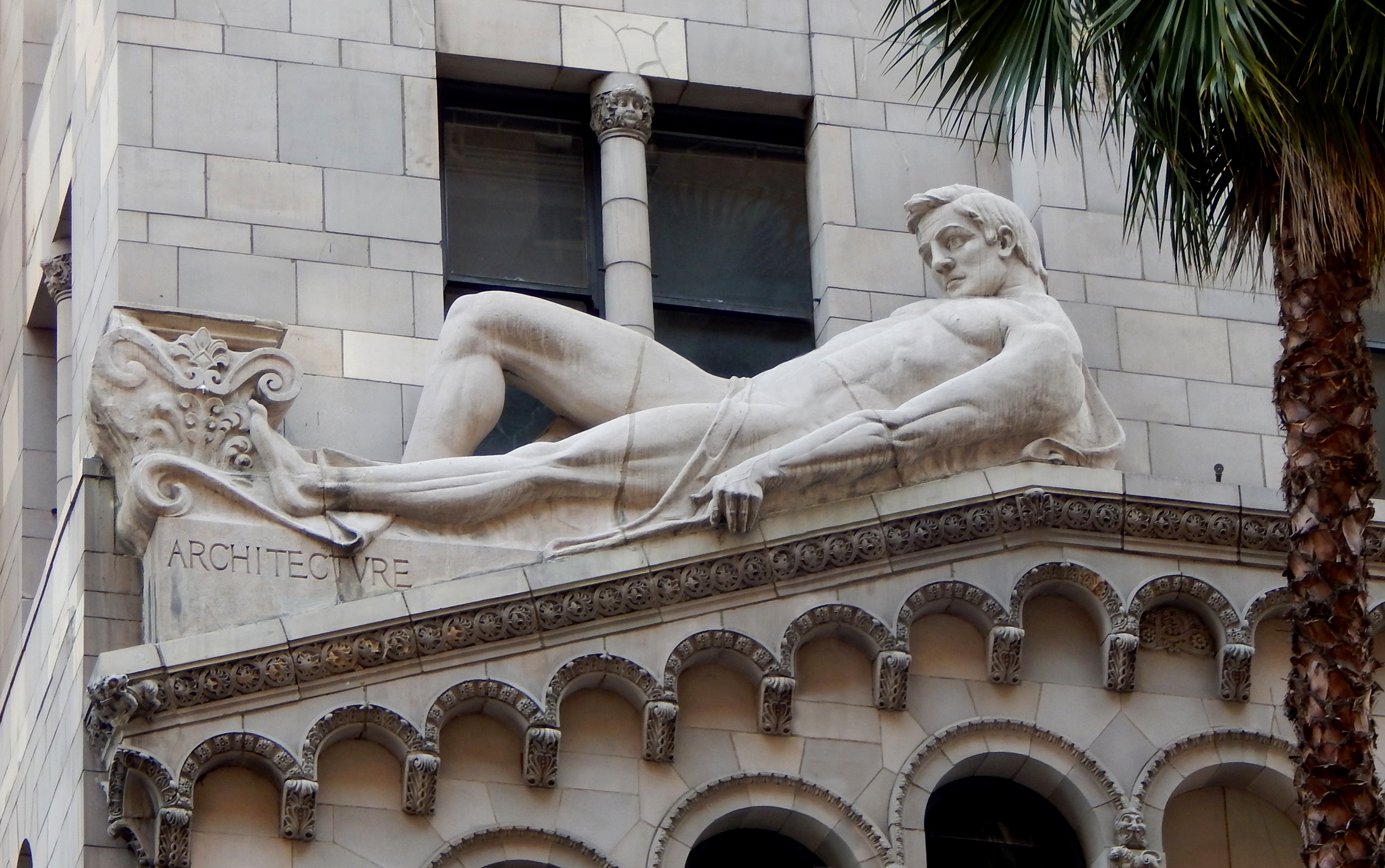
Architecture, façade sculpture at 4th floor, left side, of Fine Arts Building, Los Angeles

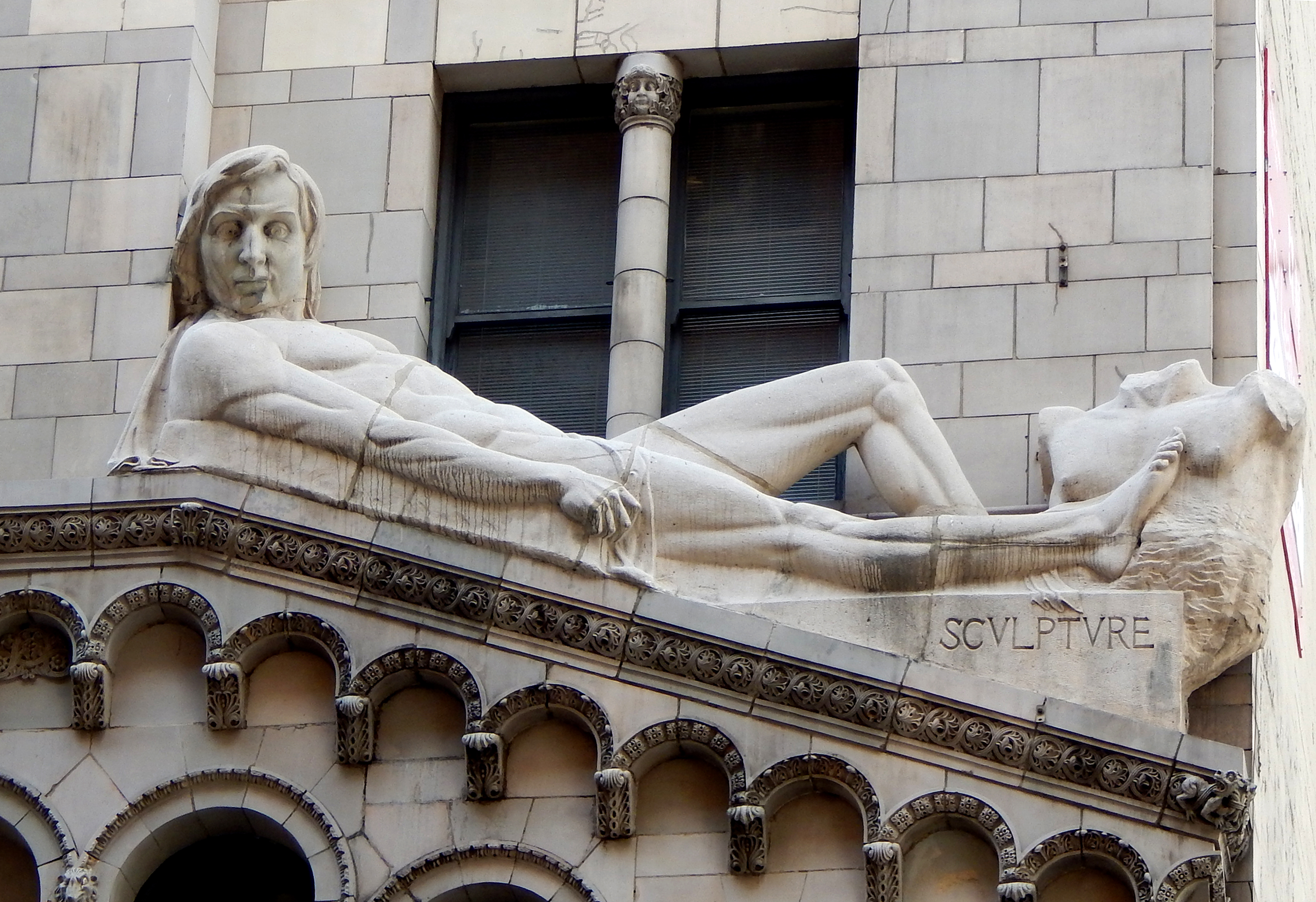
Sculpture, façade sculpture at 4th floor, right side, of Fine Arts Building, Los Angeles

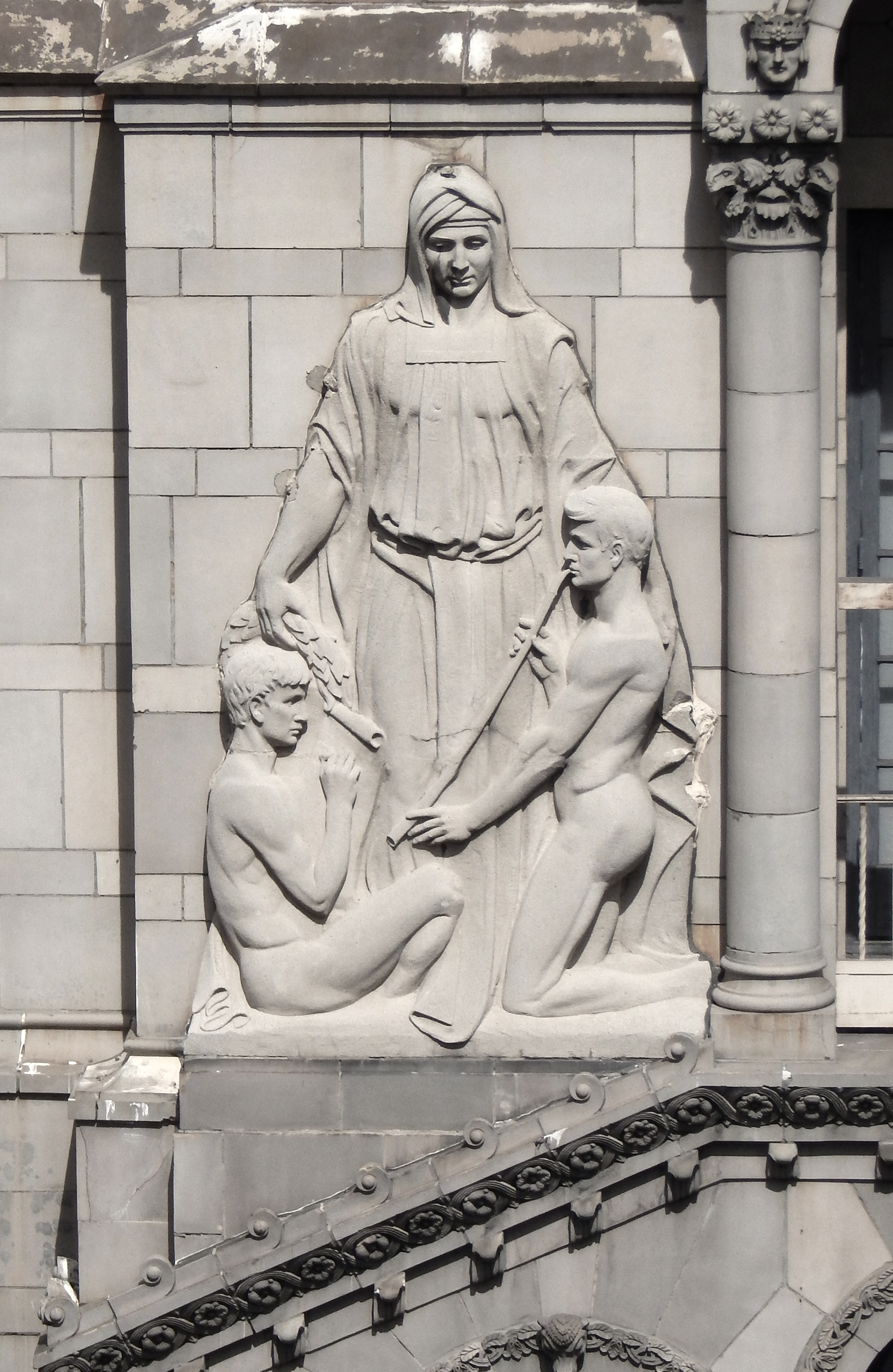
Façade bas-relief at top, left side, of Fine Arts Building, Los Angeles

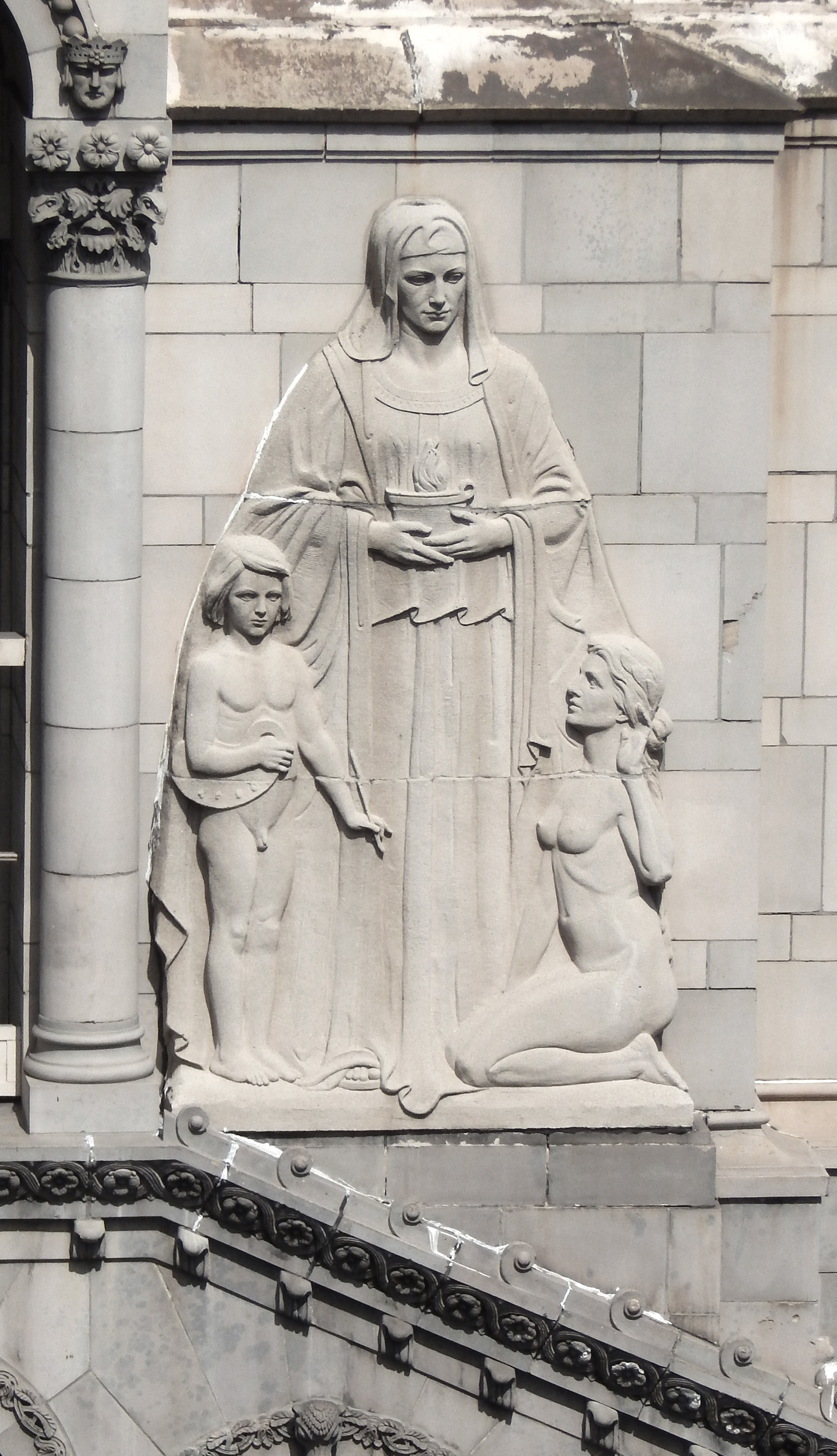
Façade bas-relief at top, right side, of Fine Arts Building, Los Angeles

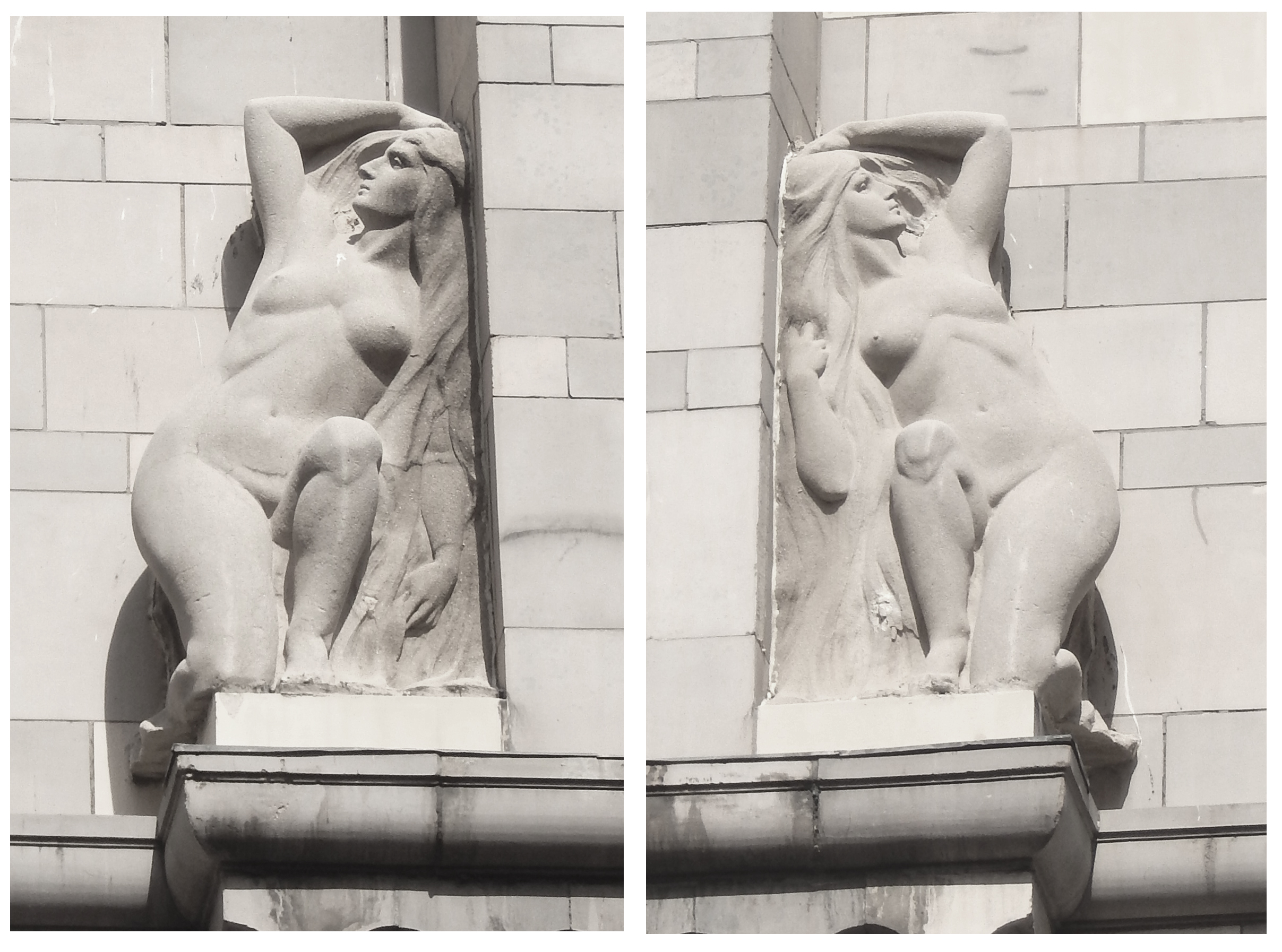
Façade sculptures at 10th floor, left and right side, of Fine Arts Building, Los Angeles
