= Doughboy Park =

Public park in Queens, New York

- Woodside doughboy statue near the park entrance
- Interactive map of Doughboy Park
- Type: Urban park
- Location: Woodside, Queens, New York City
- Coordinates: 40°44′46.58″N 73°54′31.52″W
- Area: 1.71 acres (0.69 ha)
- Created: 1957
- Operator: New York City
- Open: All year

Doughboy Park is a 1.71-acre (6,900 m^{2}) New York City public park and memorial in the Woodside neighborhood of Queens. It is located on a hilly parcel of land between Skillman Avenue and Woodside Avenue, and between 54th Street and 56th Street. The park was named in 1971.

== History ==
The park land was originally obtained by the city as a play area for local school P.S. 11 in 1893. During the First World War, local soldiers met here before shipping off to the front in Europe. A memorial was commissioned by the Woodside Community Council for these soldiers, including ten who were killed during the war. The memorial was dedicated on Memorial Day, 30 May 1923. It features a statue of a somber, wounded American infantryman, colloquially called a doughboy. The bronze statue was created by Flushing, Queens based sculptor Burt Johnson, who also designed another doughboy statue in DeWitt Clinton Park in Manhattan. The statue was selected as the best memorial of its kind in 1928 by the American Federation of Artists.

The terrain of the park was considered too steep for children to play on, and in 1957 the land was turned over to the New York City Department of Parks and Recreation. In 1959, the section of 54th Street between 39th Drive and Woodside Avenue was removed and converted to parkland, connecting the park to the adjacent Windmuller Park. Seating, paths, and trees were later installed in the park, and in 1971 the park was given its current name. A conservation project in 1990 restored the statue, and multiple upgrades to the park have maintained the park.

Also during the 1990 renovations, the park gained another prominent feature: an accurately oriented compass rose embedded in the pavement, annotated with the names of the ancient Greek wind gods (the Anemoi).

Since the installation of the statue in 1923, the park has been the location of local Memorial Day observances and other patriotic events. In 2006, on the fifth anniversary of the September 11, 2001 terrorist attacks, a memorial plaque in the park was dedicated. It reads:

On September 11, 2001, the following who lived or worked in Woodside died in the World Trade Center attack. Their lives touched our hearts, their sacrifice changed us forever.

We remember them with love and honor.
(34 names follow)

In 2017, it was announced that Doughboy Plaza's seating area and 9/11 memorial would be rebuilt at a cost of $750,000. The project budget was later doubled, and the reconstruction was approved in early 2018. The project would be completed by 2020.
