= List of public art in Washington, D.C., Ward 6 =

This is a list of public art in Ward 6 of Washington, D.C.

This list applies only to works of public art accessible in an outdoor public space. For example, this does not include artwork visible inside a museum.

Most of the works mentioned are sculptures. When this is not the case (i.e. sound installation, for example) it is stated next to the title.

Title	Artist	Year	Location/GPS Coordinates	Material	Dimensions	Owner	Image
A Soldier's Journey	Sabin Howard	September 13, 2024 (dedication)	National World War I Memorial 38°53′46″N 77°1′58″W	Bronze	10 feet tall (3 m), 58 feet long (18 m)		
Victims of Communism Memorial	Tiananmen Square protesters of 1989, statue recreated by Thomas Marsh	June 12, 2007 (dedication)	Massachusetts and New Jersey Avenues and G Street, N.W. 38°53′55″N 77°00′43″W	Bronze	10 feet tall (3 m)	Victims of Communism Memorial Foundation	
Japanese American Memorial to Patriotism During World War II	Nina Akumu & Paul Matisse	2000	Louisiana Ave., New Jersey Ave. & D St., N.W. 38°53′40″N 77°00′38″W	Bronze & barbed wire	14 feet (4.3 m)	National Park Service	
Columbus Fountain	Lorado Taft	June 8, 1912 (dedication)	Columbus Circle 38°53′47″N 77°00′24″W	Marble	45 feet × 66 feet × 44 feet (14 m × 20 m × 13 m)	National Park Service	
George Gordon Meade Memorial	Charles Grafly	1927	Constitution Ave. & Pennsylvania Ave, N.W. 38°53′31.7″N 77°0′59.2″W				
District Building Allegorical Roofline Figures	Adolfo Nesti	c. 1907–08	1350 E St., N.W. Washington	Marble	28 figures. Each figure: H. 8 ft.	John A. Wilson Building	
Freedom Bell, American Legion	Unknown	1975	Union Station 38°53′47.6″N 77°0′23.5″W	Bronze and Concrete	8 tons	National Park Service	
The Progress of Railroading	Louis Saint-Gaudens	1908	Union Station 38°53′47.6″N 77°0′23.5″W	Granite	18 feet (5.5 m) each for 6 figures		
William Frederick Allen Memorial Plaque			Union Station	Bronze			
Lest We Forget			Union Station	Bronze			
Senate Garage Fountain			N. Capital & D St., N.E.	Granite			
John Philip Sousa	Terry Jones	2005	7th St. & Virginia Ave., S.E.	Bronze			
Peace Monument	Franklin Simmons	1877	Peace Circle	Marble	approx. 40 × 10 × 10 ft.	Architect of the Capitol	
Ulysses S. Grant Memorial	Henry Shrady, Edmond Amateis & Sherry Edmundson Fry	1912–1920	Union Square at The National Mall 38°53′23.24″N 77°0′46.49″W	Bronze & Marble	Equestrian statue of Grant: approx. 17 ft. 2 in. × 8 ft. × 4 ft.; Base: approx. 22½ ft. × 6 ft. 4 ft.; Platform: approx. W. 252 ft. D. 71 ft. (10,700 lbs.).	United States Department of the Interior	
John J. Pershing General of the Armies	Robert White	1983	Pershing Park	Bronze & Granite	Sculpture: approx. 108 × 28 × 28 in.; Base: approx. 51 × 53 × 53 in.; Wall facing rear of sculpture: approx. H. 10 ft. W. 3 ft. L. 31½ ft.; Wall facing left side of sculpture: approx. H. 10 ft. W. 3 ft. L. 49 ft.	United States Department of the Interior	
Bulletin Building Reliefs	Charles Sullivan	1928	717 6th Street, N.W.	Stone	4 reliefs. Overall facade area: approx. 37 × 25 ft.	717 6th Street Associates	
Stephenson Grand Army of the Republic Memorial	J. Massey Rhind	1909	Indiana Plaza	Bronze, Granite & Concrete	Shaft: approx. H. 25 ft.; Base: approx. H. 2 ft.	United States Department of the Interior	
Friendship Archway	Alfred H. Liu	1985	Chinatown	Steel, Ceramic, Marble, Wood, Metal or Concrete, Gold Leaf & Granite	Overall: approx. H. 47 ft. 7 in. × W. 75 ft. (128 tons).	Office of Business and Economic Development	
Government Printing Office Workers	Armin Scheler	1937	United States Government Printing Office	Cast stone	3 reliefs. Each relief: approx. 9 ft. × 5 ft. × 6 in.	General Services Administration	
Titanic Memorial	Gertrude Vanderbilt Whitney & John Horrigan	1926	Waterfront Park, 4th & P St., S.W.	Granite & Concrete	Sculpture: approx. 12 × 8 × 2 ft.; Base: approx. 5½ × 4 × 4 ft.; Platform: approx. W. 50 ft. × D. 13 ft.	United States Department of the Interior	
Literature, Science, Art	Bela Pratt	1895	Library of Congress	Granite		Library of Congress	
Court of Neptune Fountain	Roland Hinton Perry	1897–98	Library of Congress	Bronze & Granite	Basin: W. 50 ft.; Figures range from: H. 10 ft. to H. 12 ft.	Architect of the Capitol	
Andrew W. Mellon Memorial Fountain	Sidney Waugh & Otto Eggers	1949–1951	Constitution Ave & 6th St. at Pennsylvania Ave, N.W. 38°53′33″N 77°1′10″W	Bronze, Granite & Quartz	Fountain: approx. Diam: 38 ft.; Base: approx. 66 ft.	United States Department of the Interior	
Robert A. Taft Memorial	Wheeler Williams	1958	United States Capitol 38°53′34″N 77°0′40″W	Bronze, Granite & Marble	Figure: approx. 12 × 3½ × 2 ft.; Base: approx. 5½ × 4½ × 3 ft.; Tower: approx. 100 × 32 × 11 ft.	Architect of the Capitol	
Justice and History	Thomas Crawford	Original 1863 Replacement 1974	United States Capitol – Senate Wing	Marble	Overall: 3 ft. 10 in. × 11 ft. 2 in. × 2 ft. 2 in.	United States Capitol	
Decorative Wreath Panels	Paul Manship	1959–60	United States Capitol	Marble		United States Capitol	
Lyndon Baines Johnson Megalith	Harold Vogel	1975	Lady Bird Johnson Park	Granite	Approx. 19 × 7 × 7 ft.	United States Department of the Interior	
Reverence	Deirdre Saunder	1991	701 Maryland Avenue, N.E.	Painted metal	Sculpture: approx. 7 ft. × 3 ft. 9 in. × 1/2 in.; Base: approx. 5½ in. × 2 ft. 10 in. × 1 ft. 3 in.	DC Art/Works	
The Bex Eagle	Lorenzo Ghiglieri	1982	Pershing Park	Silicon Bronze & Granite	Sculpture: approx. 40½ × 50 × 33 in.; Base: approx. 4 ft. 11 in. × 2 ft. 8 in. × 2 ft. 8 in.	United States Department of the Interior	
Social Security Relief Panels	Emma Lu Davis & Henry Kreis	1941	United States Department of Health and Human Services	Granite	3 Panels. Relief: approx. H. 7½ ft. W. 6½.	General Services Administration	
Railroad Retirement	Robert Kittredge	1941	United States Department of Health and Human Services	Granite	Relief: approx. 9 ft. × 8 ft. × 6 in.	General Services Administration	
Shorepoints I	James Rosati	1977	United States Department of Health and Human Services	Painted Aluminum	Approx. H. 9 ft. W. 20 ft.	General Services Administration	
Railroad Employment	Robert Kittredge	1941	330 C. St, S.W., South Building	Red granite	Relief: approx. 9 ft. × 8 ft. × 6 in.	General Services Administration	
Urban Life	John Gregory	1939–1942	Municipal Center, 300 Indiana Avenue, N.W., West Entrance	Granite	Relief: approx. 12 ft. × 11 ft. × 15 in.	Department of Administrative Services	
Health and Welfare	Hildreth Meiere	1941	Municipal Center, 300 Indiana Avenue, N.W., West Entrance	Ceramic	Mural: approx. H. 8 ft. × W. 81 ft.	Department of Administrative Services	
Democracy in Action	Waylande Gregory	1941	Municipal Center, 300 Indiana Avenue, N.W., West Courtyard	High-fire ceramic clay in Terra cotta.	Relief: approx. H. 8 ft. × L. 81 ft.	Department of Administrative Services	
Heating Plant Machinery	Paul Philippe Cret	1933	Central Heating & Refrigeration Plant, 13th St. between C & D St.		5 reliefs. Four reliefs: approx. H. 1½ ft. W. 2 ft.; One relief: approx. H. 14 ft. W. 7 ft.	General Services Administration	
Abstract	Wyten	1989	820 1st St., N.W.	Painted Metal	Sculpture: approx. 9 × 9 × 9 ft.	Unknown	
The Maine Lobsterman	Victor Kahill	1981	Water St. & 6th St., S.W. 38°52′37″N 77°1′18″W	Bronze & Granite	Sculpture: approx. 5 × 2 × 3½ ft.; Boulder: approx. H. 4 ft.; Flat stone block base: approx. W. 4½ ft. D. 8 ft.	United States Department of the Interior	
John Marshall: Chief Justice of the United States	William Wetmore Story	c. 1920	C St. & 3rd St., N.W. 38°53′36″N 77°1′3″W	Bronze & Granite	Sculpture: approx. 6 ft. 10 in. × 4 ft. 10 in. × 7 ft. 10 in.; Base: 5 ft. 4 in.x 4 ft. 10 in. 7 ft.	General Services Administration	
Torch of Learning	Edward Pearce Casey	1893	Library of Congress	Gilded Copper	Sculpture: approx. H. 15 ft. W. 4½ ft.; Base: approx. W. 6½ ft.	Architect of the Capitol	
Ethnological Heads	William Boyd, Henry Jackson Ellicott & Otis Mason	1891	Library of Congress	Granite	33 keystone heads. Each: approx. H. 18 in. W. 12 in.	Architect of the Capitol	
Pension Building Frieze	Caspar Buberl	1883	National Building Museum 38°53′52″N 77°1′3″W	Terra cotta	approx. H. 3 ft. D. 4 in. L. 1,200 ft.	National Building Museum	
The Torch of Freedom	Felix de Weldon	1976	Constitution Ave. & 2nd St. at Maryland Ave., N.E. 38°53′33″N 77°0′59″W	Bronze, Granite & Marble	Sculpture: approx. H. 35 ft. W. 7 ft.; Base: approx. H. 1 in. W. 9 ft.		
The Evolution of Justice Doors	John James Donnelly	1935	United States Supreme Court Building	Bronze	Overall: approx. H. 17 ft. W. 9½ ft. (3,000 lbs.).	Architect of the Capitol	
The Old Brick Capitol Plaque		1950	United States Supreme Court Building			Architect of the Capitol	
Justice, the Guardian of Liberty	Hermon Atkins MacNeil	1935	United States Supreme Court Building	Marble	approx. H. 18 ft. W. 60 ft.	Architect of the Capitol	
Figure of Puck over Fountain and Pool	Brenda Putnam	1932	Folger Shakespeare Library 38°53′21.7″N 77°0′11.4″W	Marble	Sculpture: approx. H. 46 in. × W. 35 in.	Folger Shakespeare Library	
Tragedy and Comedy	Paul Philippe Cret	1932	Folger Shakespeare Library 38°53′21.7″N 77°0′11.4″W	Marble	2 reliefs. Each: approx. H. 2 ft. W. 2 ft.	Folger Shakespeare Library	
Scenes from Shakespeare	John Gregory	1932	Folger Shakespeare Library 38°53′21.7″N 77°0′11.4″W	Marble	9 reliefs. Each: W. 72 in. × H. 62 in.	Folger Shakespeare Library	
The Lone Sailor	Stanley Bleifeld	1986	United States Navy Memorial 38°53′39″N 77°1′23″W	Bronze & Granite	2 parts. Figure: approx. 7 ft. 1 in. × 32 in. × 27 in.; Base: approx. H. 2 in. W. 32 in.; Duffel bag: approx. 46 × 24 × 43 in.; Base: approx. 3 × 21 × 30 in.	United States Department of the Interior	
United States Navy Memorial		1987	United States Navy Memorial 38°53′39″N 77°1′23″W	Bronze & Granite		United States Department of the Interior	
Emancipation Memorial	Thomas Ball	1875	Lincoln Park 38°53′23″N 76°59′20″W	Bronze & Granite	Sculpture: approx. 9 × 6 × 4 ft.; Base: approx. 9 × 12 × 10 ft.	United States Department of the Interior	
General Winfield Scott Hancock	Henry Jackson Ellicott	1896	7th St & Pennsylvania Ave. 38°53′37.46″N 77°1′20.12″W	Bronze & Granite	Sculpture: approx. H. 9 ft. W. 7 ft.; Upper base: approx. 4 ft.x 19 ft. 4 in. × 3 ft. 8 in. Diam . 25 ft.; Lower base: approx. W. 10 ft. L. 17 ft. D. 1 ft. 5 in.	United States Department of the Interior	
Columbus Door	Randolph Rogers	1860	United States Capitol	Bronze	16 ft. 8 in. × 9 ft. 9 in.	United States Capitol	
War and Peace	E. Luigi Persico, Paul Manship	1835, Replacement: 1960	United States Capitol	Marble	Sculptures: approx. H. 10 ft.; Base: approx. H. 4 ft. Diam. 45 in.	United States Capitol	
James A. Garfield Monument	John Quincy Adams Ward	1887	United States Capitol 38°53′19″N 77°0′46″W	Bronze	Overall: approx. H. 25 ft.; Garfield: approx. H. 9 ft.; Seated figures on base: approx. H. 5 ft.	Architect of the Capitol	
Eagles	Frederick Roth	1934	Interstate Commerce Commission	Limestone		General Services Administration	
Intercommunication Between Continents of America and Asia	Sidney Waugh		Interstate Commerce Commission	Limestone	10 ft. × 45 ft.	General Services Administration	
Security of the Mails	Joseph E. Renier	1934	Interstate Commerce Commission	Limestone	3½ ft.	General Services Administration	
Spirit of Progress and Civilization Pediment	Adolph Weinman	1934	Interstate Commerce Commission, 13th St. Facade	Limestone	12 ft. × 67 ft.	General Services Administration	
The Recorder of the Archives	James Earle Fraser	1935	National Archives and Records Administration, 7th & Pennsylvania Ave.	Limestone	H. 8 ft.	National Archives and Records Administration	
Medallions on National Archives	James Earle Fraser, Robert Ingersoll Aitken & Ulysses Ricci	1934	National Archives and Records Administration, 7th & Pennsylvania Ave. 38°53′33.64″N 77°1′23.15″W	Indiana Limestone	13 medallions. Each medallion: Diam. 8 ft.	National Archives and Records Administration	
Acroterion Eagles	James Earle Fraser, Robert Ingersoll Aitken & Ulysses Ricci		National Archives and Records Administration	Limestone		National Archives and Records Administration	
John Philip Sousa Monument	Unknown	c. 1933	Congressional Cemetery			Association for the Preservation of Historic Congressional Cemetery	
Walter Jones Memorial	Unknown		Congressional Cemetery	Marble		Association for the Preservation of Historic Congressional Cemetery	
General Alexander Macomb Monument	Unknown	1941	Congressional Cemetery – NE Section, Range 55, Site 147	Marble & Granite	Obelisk: approx. H. 78 in.; Shaft: approx. 22 × 40 × 40 in.; Base: approx. 14 × 42 × 42 in.	Association for the Preservation of Historic Congressional Cemetery	
Taza (Burial Marker)	Doug Hyde	1971	Congressional Cemetery	Stone & Granite	Sculpture: approx. 1 ft. 6 in. × 1 ft. 6 in. × 8 in.; Base: approx. 4 in. × 2 ft. × 10 in.	Association for the Preservation of Historic Congressional Cemetery	
Latrobe Cenotaphs	Benjamin Henry Latrobe	1816–1877	Congressional Cemetery	Sandstone	Over 100. Each: H. 4½ ft.	Association for the Preservation of Historic Congressional Cemetery	
Lieutenant John T. McLaughlin Monument	Struthers & Company	1847	Congressional Cemetery – SE Section, Range 50, Site 253	Marble		Association for the Preservation of Historic Congressional Cemetery	
Arsenal Monument	Lot Flannery	1865	Congressional Cemetery – NW Section, Range 97, Section 142 38°52′53″N 76°58′50″W	Marble, Granite	Sculpture: 25 ft. × 5 ft. 6 in. × 5 ft. 6 in. Base: 1 ft. 1 in. × 6 ft. × 6 ft.	National Cemetery Administration	
The Progress of Civilization	Thomas Crawford	1859	United States Capitol, Senate Wing	Marble	Pediment: L. 80 ft. × H. 12 ft.	Architect of the Capitol	
General Casimir Pulaski	Kazimierz Chodziński	1910	Pennsylvania Ave & 13th St., N.W. 38°53′45.4″N 77°1′48.1″W	Bronze	Sculpture: approx. H. 15 ft. W. 12 ft.; Base: approx. H. 12 ft. W. 15 ft.	United States Department of the Interior	
Water	C. Paul Jennewein	1933	United States Department of Justice, 10th St. & Constitution Ave., N.W.	Marble		Department of Justice	
Fire	C. Paul Jennewein	1933	United States Department of Justice, 10th St. & Constitution Ave., N.W.			Department of Justice	
Viking Ships Relief	C. Paul Jennewein	1932–1934	United States Department of Justice, 10th St. & Constitution Ave., N.W.	Limestone		Department of Justice	
Four Winds Reliefs	C. Paul Jennewein	1932–1934	United States Department of Justice, 10th St. & Constitution Ave., N.W.	Limestone		Department of Justice	
Law and Order Relief	C. Paul Jennewein	1935	United States Department of Justice, 10th St. & Constitution Ave., N.W. 38°53′45″N 77°1′48″W	Limestone	Relief: approx. H. 6 ft. W. 10 ft.	General Services Administration	
Albert Pike Memorial	Gaetano Trentanove	Cast 1899	3rd & D St., N.W.	Bronze & Granite	Sculpture: approx. H. 11 ft.; Base: approx. W. 17 ft. 1 in. D. 17 ft. 2 in.	United States Department of the Interior	
Captain Nathan Hale	Bela Lyon Pratt	Cast 1930	United States Department of Justice	Bronze & Granite	Sculpture: approx. 76 × 26 × 23 in.; Base: approx. 49¼ × 27 × 26½ in.	General Services Administration	
Supreme Court Flagpole Bases	John Donnelly	1935	United States Capitol	Bronze & Marble	2 flagpole bases. Each flagpole base: approx. H. 9 ft. W. 6 ft.	Architect of the Capitol	
Genius of America	Bruno Mankowski	1828	United States Capitol	Marble	Pediment: approx. W. 81 ft. 6 in.; Figures: approx. H. 9 ft.	Architect of the Capitol	
Columbia Pediment	Edgar Walter	1935	United States Customs Building, 14th & Constitution, N.W. 38°53′32.18″N 77°1′55.21″W	Limestone	18 ft. 9 in. × 86 ft. 6 in.	General Services Administration	
Commodore John Paul Jones	Charles Henry Niehaus	1912	West Potomac Park 38°53′18″N 77°2′22″W	Bronze	Sculpture: bronze; Base: granite or Vermont marble; Pylon: marble. Fountains: marble.	United States Department of the Interior	
Drafting the Declaration of Independence	Adolph Weinman	1943	East Potomac Park 38°52′53.17″N 77°2′11.81″W	Marble	Pediment: approx. H. 10 ft. W. 65 ft.	National Park Service	
Jefferson Memorial: Thomas Jefferson	Rudulph Evans	1943	East Potomac Park 38°52′53″N 77°2′12″W	Bronze	Sculpture: H. 19 ft.; Base: H. 6 ft.	National Park Service	
The Progress of Railroading	Louis St. Gaudens	1908	Union Station	Granite	6 figures. Each figure: H. 18 ft.		
Columbus Statue	Lorado Taft	1912	Union Station	Marble	45 × 66 × 44 ft.; Shaft: H. 40 ft.; Basin: D. 64 ft.	United States Department of the Interior	
Vaquero	Luis Jiménez	1990	Smithsonian American Art Museum	Acrylic urethane, fiberglass & steel armature	H. 16½ ft.	Smithsonian American Art Museum	
Abundance and Industry	Sherry Edmundson Fry	1936	United States Customs Building	Limestone	11 ft. 3 in. × 26½ ft.	General Services Administration	
Trylon of Freedom	C. Paul Jennewein	1954	Federal District Court	Granite	H. 24 ft.	Federal District Court	
Abraham Lincoln	Lot Flannery	1868	Supreme Court of the District of Columbia	Marble	Sculpture: approx. 7 ft. 3 in. × 2 ft. 9 in. × 2 ft. 5 in.; Base: approx. 6 ft. 4 in. × 7 ft. × 7 ft.	District of Columbia, Department of Administrative Services	
Oscar Straus Memorial	Adolph Alexander Weinman	1947	Interior courtyard of Federal Triangle at 14th & Constitution Ave, N.W. 38°53′38″N 77°1′54″W	Bronze	5 ft. × 5 ft. 6 in. × 11 ft. 6 in.	General Services Administration	
Sir William Blackstone	Paul Wayland Bartlett	c. 1920	Constitution Ave. & 3rd St. N.W. 38°53′33″N 77°0′57″W	Gilded Bronze	Sculpture: approx. H. 9 ft.	United States Department of the Interior	
Darlington Memorial Fountain: Nymph and Fawn	C. Paul Jennewein	1922	Judiciary Park at 5th & D St. 38°53′43″N 77°1′7″W	Gilded Bronze	Figure: approx. H. 5 × 3 × 3 ft.; Base: approx. H. 4 ft. × 3 ft. 6 in. × 3 ft.; Basin: approx. H. 1⅓ ft. × Diam. 18 ft.	District of Columbia	
Benjamin Franklin	Jacques Jouvenal	1889	Old Post Office Pavilion 38°53′41″N 77°1′40″W	Carrara Marble	Sculpture: approx. H. 8 ft.; Base: approx. W. 5½ ft. × D. 5½ ft.	United States Department of the Interior	
Mary McLeod Bethune Memorial	Robert Berks	1973	Lincoln Park 38°53′23″N 76°59′20″W	Bronze	Sculpture: approx. 10 × 15.5 × 9 ft.; Base: approx. 5 ft. 5 in. × 25 ft. × 20 ft.	United States Department of the Interior	
Temperance Fountain	Henry D. Cogswell	1880	Pennsylvania Ave & 7th St, N.W. 38°52′37.7″N 77°1′18.1″W	Bronze or Zinc	Overall: approx. H. 14 ft.; Fish sculpture: approx. H. 4 ft. 8 in.; Figure base: approx. H. 3 ft. 7 in. Diam. 2 ft. 3 in.	United States Department of the Interior	
Major General Nathanael Greene	Henry Kirke Brown	1877	Stanton Park 38°52′37″N 76°59′59″W	Bronze	Sculpture: approx. H. 11 ft. W. 15 ft.; Base: approx. 14 × 17 × 8 ft.	United States Department of the Interior	
Elbridge Gerry Monument	John Frazee	1823	Congressional Cemetery, NE Section, Range 29, site 9–10 38°52′57″N 76°58′41″W	Marble	Sculpture: approx. 11 ft. × 4 ft. 10 in. × 4 ft. 10 in.; Base: approx. 10 in. × 6 ft. × 6 ft.	Association for the Preservation of Historic Congressional Cemetery	
Department of Justice Pediment: Ars Boni and Ars Aequi	C. Paul Jennewein	1934	Robert F. Kennedy Department of Justice Building	Limestone	2 pediments. Each: L. 50 ft.	United States Department of Justice	
Bureaus of the Department of Commerce	James Earle Fraser	1931	United States Department of Commerce 38°53′39.48″N 77°1′58.08″W	Limestone	8 reliefs. Each relief: approx. H. 5 ft. W. 3 ft.	General Services Administration	
Alexander Robey Shepherd	Ulric Stonewall Jackson Dunbar	1905	John A. Wilson Building 38°53′43.36″N 77°1′53.74″W	Bronze	Sculpture: approx. H. 8 ft.; Base: approx. H. 7 ft. 6 in. W. 9 ft. 3 in.	District of Columbia	
Apotheosis of Democracy	Paul Wayland Bartlett	1916	United States Capitol	Marble	Pediment: approx. L. 60 ft.	United States Capitol	
Bartholdi Fountain	Frédéric Auguste Bartholdi	c. 1876	United States Capitol	Cast iron	Fountain: approx. H. 30 ft.; Basin: approx. Diam. 35 ft. (15,000 lbs.).	United States Capitol	
Revolutionary War Door	Thomas Crawford William Henry Rinehart	1904	United States Capitol	Bronze	H. 14 ft. 5 in.	United States Capitol	
George Washington and the Revolutionary War Door	Thomas Crawford	1864–1868	United States Capitol	Bronze	H. 14 ft. 5 in.	United States Capitol	
Statue of Freedom	Thomas Crawford	1860	United States Capitol dome 38°53′24″N 77°0′32″W	Bronze	H. 19 ft. 6 in. (14,985 lbs.).	United States Capitol	
Greek Vases	W.H. Livingston, Sr.	1964	Rayburn House Office Building	Marble	8 vessels. Each: approx. 9 × 3½ × 9 ft.	Architect of the Capitol	
Spirit of Justice	C. Paul Jennewein	1961	Rayburn House Office Building 38°53′14″N 77°0′39″W	Marble	Sculpture: approx. 8 × 4½ × 5½ ft.; Base: approx. 6 in. × 4½ ft. × 5½ ft.	United States Capitol	
The Majesty of Law	C. Paul Jennewein	1961	Rayburn House Office Building 38°53′14″N 77°0′39″W	Marble	Sculpture: approx. 8 × 4½ × 5½ ft.; Base: approx. 6 in. × 4½ ft. × 5½ ft.	United States Capitol	
The Authority of Law	James Earle Fraser	1935	United States Supreme Court 38°53′27″N 77°0′20″W	Marble	Sculpture: approx. 6 × 6 × 8 ft.; Base: approx. 15 × 10 × 12 ft. (45 tons).	United States Capitol	
The Contemplation of Justice	James Earle Fraser	1935	United States Supreme Court 38°53′26″N 77°0′16″W	Marble	Sculpture: approx. 6 × 6 × 8 ft.; Base: approx. 15 × 10 × 12 ft. (45 tons).	United States Capitol	
United States Supreme Court Justice Bust Collection	Various Artists	1844–Present	United States Supreme Court	Marble	H. 27 in.	United States Supreme Court	
American Professional Workers and American Laborers	Joseph Kiselewski	1951	Government Accountability Office		Each panel: 10 ft. 1 × 16 ft. × 2 ft. 1/2 in.	General Services Administration	
Figure	Jacques Lipchitz	1930	Smithsonian Institution 38°53′20.74″N 77°1′22.84″W	Bronze	87½ × 38½ × 28½ in.	Library of Congress	
Eminent Men of Letters	Frederick Ruckstull & Herbert Adams	1894–95	Library of Congress	Granite	H. 3 ft.	Library of Congress	
America Fostering the Arts and Industries and Atlantes	William Boyd	1897	Library of Congress	Granite	Male columns: H. 6 ft.	Library of Congress	
Progress of Maritime Trade Facilities	William McVey	1937	Apex Building	Aluminum	4 sets of doors. Each: 12½ × 3¾ ft.	General Services Administration	
American Eagle	Sidney Waugh	1938	Federal Trade Commission Building 38°53′34.24″N 77°1′17.98″W	Limestone	D. 5½ ft.	General Services Administration	
Foreign and Domestic Commerce Pediment	Ulysses Ricci	1934	Herbert C. Hoover Building 38°53′39.48″N 77°1′58.08″W	Limestone	11 × 45 ft.	General Services Administration	
Mining Pediment	Frederick Roth	1934	Herbert C. Hoover Building 38°53′39.48″N 77°1′58.08″W	Limestone	11 × 45 ft.	General Services Administration	
Aeronautics Pediment	Haig Patigian	1934	Herbert C. Hoover Building 38°53′39.48″N 77°1′58.08″W	Limestone	11 × 45 ft.	General Services Administration	
Fisheries Pediment	Joseph Kiselewski	1934	Herbert C. Hoover Building 38°53′39.48″N 77°1′58.08″W	Limestone	11 × 45 ft.	General Services Administration	
Heritage	James Earle Fraser	1935	National Archives and Records Administration 38°53′32″N 77°1′24″W	Indiana Limestone	H. 8 ft.	National Archives and Records Administration	
Guardianship	James Earle Fraser	1935	National Archives and Records Administration 38°53′34″N 77°1′23″W	Indiana Limestone	H. 8 ft.	National Archives and Records Administration	
The Guardians of the Portal	Robert Ingersoll Aitken	1935	National Archives and Records Administration	Indiana Limestone	Two reliefs. Each relief: approx. H. 8 ft. × W. 5 ft.	National Archives and Records Administration	
Destiny Pediment	Adolph Alexander Weinman	1935	National Archives and Records Administration 38°53′35.53″N 77°1′22.59″W	Indiana Limestone, Granite	L. 100 ft.	National Archives and Records Administration	
Man Controlling Trade	Michael Lantz	1942	Federal Trade Commission Building 38°53′33.49″N 77°1′14.17″W	Limestone	2 pieces, each: 15 × 17 × 7 ft.	General Services Administration	
Americans at Work, Past and Present	Various Artists	1938	Federal Trade Commission Building 38°53′32.67″N 77°1′14.94″W	Limestone	6¾ × 12½ ft.	General Services Administration	
Primitive Means of the Transmission of Communication	Joseph E. Renier	1934	Interstate Commerce Commission	Limestone	H. 3½ ft.	General Services Administration	
The Transmission of the Mail by Day and by Night	Adolph Weinman	1934	Interstate Commerce Commission	Limestone	H. 7 ft.	General Services Administration	
Interstate Commerce Commission Pediments	Joseph Renier, Adolph Weinman, John Donnelly & George Snowden	1934	Interstate Commerce Commission	Limestone	3½ ft.	General Services Administration	
Commerce and Communications	Wheeler Williams	1935	Interstate Commerce Commission	Indiana limestone	11 ft. 3in. × 39 ft. 9 in.	General Services Administration	
Interstate Transportation	Edward McCartan	1935	Interstate Commerce Commission 38°53′37.2″N 77°1′42.5″W	Indiana limestone	11 ft. 3 in. × 39 ft. 9 in.	General Services Administration	
Eagle	Michael Lantz	1959	National Guard Association of the United States	Bronze		National Guard Association of the United States	
Acacia Griffins	Edmond Romulus Amateis	c. 1936	Acacia Life Insurance Company 38°53′48″N 77°0′33″W	Limestone	2 griffins. Each griffin: approx. 5½ × 4½ × 9 ft.; Each base: approx. 58 × 61½ × 118 in.	Acacia Life Insurance Company	
Department of Agriculture Pediments	Adolph A. Weinman	1908	Jamie L. Whitten Building 38°53′17.8″N 77°1′47.7″W	Vermont Marble	H. 6 ft. × L 25 ft.	United States Department of Agriculture	
Scenes from American Industry	Otto Eggers	1956	Dirksen Senate Office Building	Bronze	5 panels. Each: Approx. 3½ ft. square.	Dirksen Senate Office Building	
Eagle Pediment	Ulysses Ricci	1956	Dirksen Senate Office Building 38°53′42″N 77°2′11″W	Marble	D 4 ft.	Dirksen Senate Office Building	
Olive Risley Seward	John Cavanaugh	1971	601 N. Carolina Ave, S.E. 38°53′11″N 76°59′54″W	Lead over burlap	Sculpture: approx. 72 × 24 × 27 in.; Stone base: approx. 30 × 18 × 18 in.	Kresh, David & Diane	
Library of Congress Annex Doors	Lee Lawrie	1938	Adams building Library of Congress	Bronze	3 sets of doors. Each set of doors: approx. H. 12 ft.	United States Capitol	
A Cascade of Books	Frank Eliscu	c. 1983	Library of Congress	Bronze	Sculpture: approx. L. 50 ft. × W. 25 ft.	United States Capitol	
Equal Justice Under Law	Robert Ingersoll Aitken	1935	United States Supreme Court Building	Vermont Marble	Pediment: approx. H. 18 ft. W. 60 ft.	United States Capitol	
Library of Congress Doors	Herbert Adams, Levi Olin Warner & Frederick William MacMonnies	1896	Library of Congress	Bronze	H 14 ft × W 7½ ft.	United States Capitol	
Past	Robert Ingersoll Aitken	1935	National Archives and Records Administration	Indiana Limestone	Sculpture: approx. 20 × 8 × 12 ft.; Base: approx. 12 × 12 × 15 ft.	General Services Administration	
Present	Robert Ingersoll Aitken	1935	National Archives and Records Administration	Indiana Limestone	Sculpture: approx. 20 × 8 × 12 ft.; Base: approx. 12 × 12 × 15 ft.	General Services Administration	
Build-Grow	Richard Hunt	1992	700 11th St NW	Welded Bronze	Sculpture: approx. 23 ft. × 84 in. × 84 in.	Collin Equities	
Growth Columns	Richard Hunt	1992	700 11th St NW	Welded Bronze	4 columns. Columns: approx. H. ranges 15 to 19 ft. Diam. ranges 12 to 16 in.	Collin Equities	
Branching Column	Richard Hunt	1992	700 11th St NW	Welded Bronze	Sculpture: approx. 4 × 3 × 2 ft.; Base: approx. H. 7 ft. Diam. 8 in.	Collin Equities	
Swan Column	Richard Hunt	1992	700 11th St NW	Welded Bronze	Sculpture: approx. H. 3 ft. W. 4 ft.; Base: approx. H. 6 ft. Diam: 11 ft.	Collin Equities	
Composition for the Axemen	Ken Wyten		830 First Street, N.E., Washington, District of Columbia			Dreyfus, Zuckerman & Kronstadt	
Trigadilly	Chas Coburn	1990	820 1st St, N.W. – Courtyard	Painted Steel	Sculpture: approx. 35 s 4 × 16 ft.; Base: approx. 8 × 4 × 20 ft.	Dreyfus, Zuckerman & Kronstadt	
The Yellow Line	Constance Flueres	1989	Gallery Place Metro	Neon sculpture		Washington Metro	
The Glory of Chinese Descendants	Foon Sham	2000	Gallery Place Metro, Chinatown Exit			Washington Metro]	
Epoch	Albert Paley	2004	PEPCO Headquarters			Washington Metro]	
Air Shaft Tunnel	Val E. Lewton	1992	H St. N.W. & 3rd St. N.W.				
Of the People	Egon Daley	1995	One Judiciary Square, 441 4th St., N.W.				
Quadrature Nimbii	Val E. Lewton	1996	One Judiciary Square, 441 4th St., N.W.				
Hopscotch Bridge	Val E. Lewton	1997	H Street Bridge, H St. between N Capitol 7 1st St.				
Earth Point	Karen Brown	2003	Office of Homeland Security, 2720 Martin Luther King Jr. Ave., S.E.				
Ready	William Wegman		L'Enfant Plaza Metro Station				
Southwest Gateway	G. Byron Peck	2008	12th St Tunnels, Maine Ave SW & 12th St, S.W.		2400 Sq. Ft.		
Dragon Gate	Andrew T. Crawford	2007	Alley, between 603 and 604 H St., N.W.				
Balance	Marcia Billig	2002	13th St., N.E. & Constitution Ave., N.E. & Tennessee Ave., N.E.	Bronze			
Ocean Piece	Jorge Martin	1995	Archives station	Marble		Washington Metro	
The Tempest	Greg Wyatt	1993–94	Folger Shakespeare Library			Folger Shakespeare Library	
Julius Caesar	Greg Wyatt	1993–94	Folger Shakespeare Library			Folger Shakespeare Library	
King Lear	Greg Wyatt	1993–94	Folger Shakespeare Library			Folger Shakespeare Library	
Hamlet	Greg Wyatt	1993–94	Folger Shakespeare Library			Folger Shakespeare Library	
Twelfth Night	Greg Wyatt	1993–94	Folger Shakespeare Library			Folger Shakespeare Library	
A Midsummer Night's Dream	Greg Wyatt	1993–94	Folger Shakespeare Library			Folger Shakespeare Library	
Henry IV, Part 2	Greg Wyatt	1993–94	Folger Shakespeare Library			Folger Shakespeare Library	
Macbeth	Greg Wyatt	1993–94	Folger Shakespeare Library			Folger Shakespeare Library	
Bearing Witness	Martin Puryear	c. 1998	Ronald Reagan Building and International Trade Center, Woodrow Wilson Plaza 38°53′36.98″N 77°1′47.46″W	Hammer-formed bronze plate	Approx. H. 40 ft.		
Federal Triangle Flowers	Stephen Robin	c. 1998	Ronald Reagan Building and International Trade Center, Woodrow Wilson Plaza 38°53′38.03″N 77°1′46.75″W	Aluminum & Limestone	Sculptures: approx. H. 10 ft. × L. 14 ft. × W. 7 ft.		
Robert F. Kennedy Memorial	Robert Berks	c. 1969	United States Department of Justice	Bronze & Marble			
Lions	Unknown		Capital Grille, 601 Pennsylvania Ave., N.W.				
Rhodes Tavern Plaque	Unknown	2002	F & 15th Sts., N.W. 38°53′51″N 77°2′1″W				
Art Deco Eagle Lampposts	Nathan C. Wyeth		301 C St., N.W.				
The Extra Mile			Along Pennsylvania Ave., 15th St., G St., and 11th St. 38°53′44″N 77°2′1″W				
Boundary Markers			F, G, 4th & 5th Sts., N.W.				
Tool de Force			National Building Museum				
Cristoforo Columbo	Carlo Nicoli	1992	Holy Rosary Church	Bronze			
Michelangelo Buonarroti	Carlo Nicoli		Casa Italiana District of Columbia	Marble			
Giuseppe Verdi	Carlo Nicoli		Casa Italiana District of Columbia	Marble			
Dante Alighieri	Carlo Nicoli		Casa Italiana District of Columbia	Marble			
Guglielmo Marconi	Carlo Nicoli		Casa Italiana District of Columbia	Marble			
The Chess Players	Lloyd Lillie	1983	John Marshall Park	Bronze	Left figure: approx. 58 × 23 × 28 in., Right figure: approx. 58 × 29 × 38 in.		
Guns into Plowshares	Esther Augsburger & Michael Augsburger	1997	Indiana Ave. & 4th St., N.W.	Steel and 3,000 disabled handguns.	Sculpture: approx. H. 16 ft.		
National Law Enforcement Officers Memorial	Raymond Kaskey	1991	E Street, between 4th & 5th Streets, N.W. 38°53′48.28″N 77°1′3.19″W	Bronze	Lions: approx. 70 × 35 × 118 in.; Cubs: approx. 25 × 37 × 64 in.		
Lily Pond	David Phillips		Between the Canadian Embassy and the U.S. Courthouse.	Bronze			
She Who Must be Obeyed	Tony Smith		Frances Perkins Building	Steel			
Slow Rondo			United States National Academies, Keck Center				
Dwight D. Eisenhower Memorial	Frank Gehry		38°53′14″N 77°1′10″W			National Park Service	
Spirit of Haida Gwaii	Bill Reid	1988 Cast: 1991	Canadian Embassy	Bronze	13.2 ft. h. × 20 ft. l., 11,000 lbs.	Canadian Embassy	
Chthonodynamis	Robert Russin	1992	United States Department of Energy	Granite			
Heroic Shore Points	James Rosati	c. 1976	Hubert H. Humphrey Building	Aluminum			
