= Union Central =

Union Central may refer to:

- Club Unión Central, a Bolivian soccer team
- National trade union center, a federation or confederation of trade unions in a single country
- Union Central Life Insurance Company
