= Acacia Griffins =

Artwork by Edmond Amateis

Coordinates: 38°53′38.33″N 77°0′40.88″W

- Artist: Edmond Amateis
- Year: 1936
- Type: Limestone
- Dimensions: 167.64 cm × 137.16 cm × 274.32 cm (66.00 in × 54.00 in × 108.00 in)
- Location: Washington, D.C., United States

Acacia Griffins are public artworks by American sculptor Edmond Amateis, located at the Acacia Building at 51 Louisiana Avenue N.W., in Washington, D.C., United States.

== Description ==
A limestone male (right) and female (left) griffin guard the outside entrance of the building. The griffins each hold an agate egg between their paws, symbolic of the protection of their home. Like the building they were designed in the Neoclassical style. The sculptures were carved by Ugo Lavaggi.

=== Condition ===
This sculptures were surveyed in 1994 as part of the Smithsonian's Save Outdoor Sculpture! program's volunteers and were described as "well maintained".

== See also ==
- List of public art in Washington, D.C., Ward 6
