= Annetta Johnson Saint-Gaudens =

American sculptor

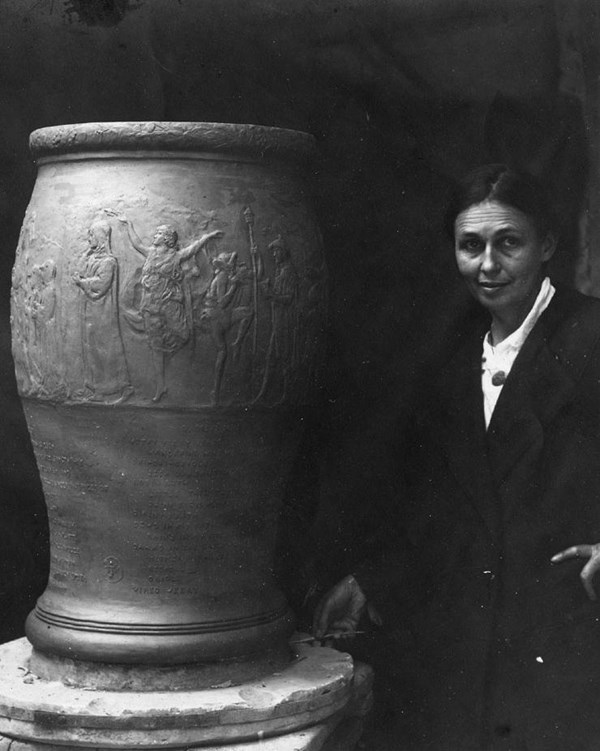
- Saint Gaudens stands in front of her clay model for an urn
- Born: Annetta Johnson; 1869; Flint, Ohio, U.S.
- Known for: Sculpture
- Spouse: Louis Saint-Gaudens

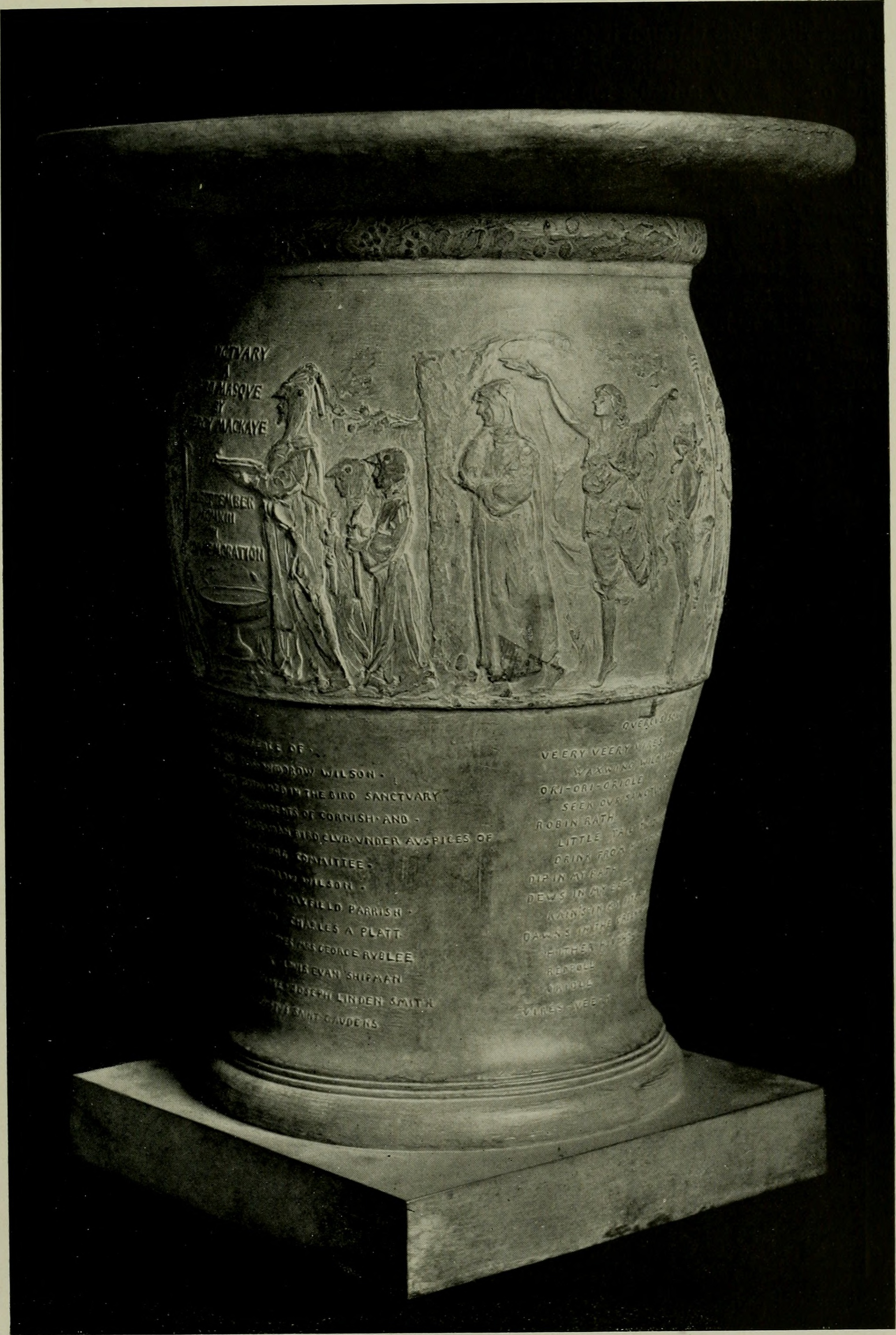
Saint-Gaudens' bronze bird fountain

Annetta Johnson Saint-Gaudens (1869–1943) was an American sculptress, born in Flint, Ohio. She is best remembered for creating sculptures of "animals, children (and) fountains", but she also did the finishing carving on a "colossal marble figure", the allegorical sculpture Painting in front of the St. Louis Art Museum. She was also significant in the art world as the wife of Louis Saint-Gaudens and sister-in-law of Augustus Saint-Gaudens, with whom she studied and worked as an assistant.

== Early years ==
As a young child Johnson began to draw and then model figures. Eventually her parents, realizing that their daughter had talent that needed to be developed, sent her to the Columbus Art School. She later moved to New York City, where she continued her studies at the Art Students League, studying with John Twachtman and Augustus Saint-Gaudens. In 1894, she joined the studio of Saint-Gaudens as an assistant to help with the commission for the General Logan Monument. In 1898, Annetta married Louis Saint-Gaudens, the brother of Augustus.

Her brother was the sculptor Burt Johnson.

== Later life ==
After their marriage, Annetta and her husband relocated to Annette's hometown of Flint, Ohio. Shortly after, in 1900, Annetta gave birth to their son, Paul. In 1900, Annetta's former teacher, and now brother-in-law, again asked for her assistance in his studio. The couple relocated to Cornish, New Hampshire, where they assisted Augustus with his major sculptural commissions after Augustus was side-lined by a cancer diagnosis. Annetta and Louis set up a home and studio, relocating an old home from a near-by shaker village. Eventually, as their son Paul became interested in ceramics, the family established a pottery kiln on the property known as "Orchard Kiln."

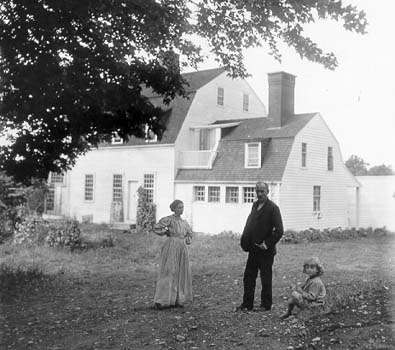
Annetta Saint-Gaudens with husband, Louis, and son, Paul, in front of their home in Cornish N.H.

Annetta became actively engaged in the social community of the Cornish Art Colony. She was a member of the Cornish Equal Suffrage. After the death of her husband, Annetta eventually relocated to Claremont, California. She continued to engage with the arts by teaching public school art classes.

== Awards ==
In 1913, Johnson was awarded the McMillin Prize by the Association of Women Painters and Sculptors of New York City. She received an honorable mention at the Panama–Pacific International Exposition in San Francisco in 1915. Twenty pieces of her work were shown in a joint exhibition with her husband at the City Art Museum of Saint Louis, in 1917.
