= Oscar Straus Memorial =

Memorial to first Jewish US Cabinet member

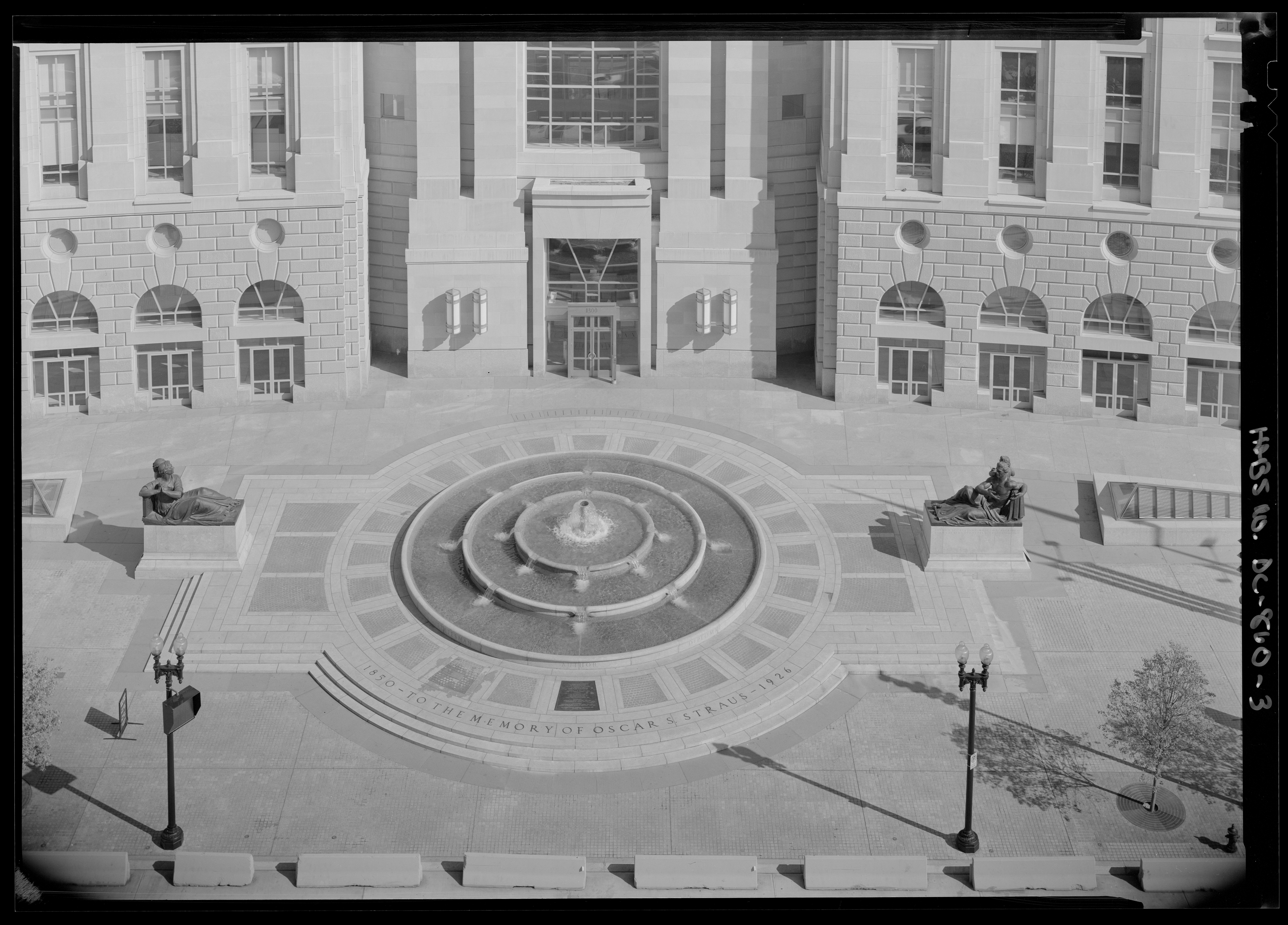
- The memorial viewed from above (date unknown)
- Location: Washington, D.C.
- Coordinates: 38.8938°N 77.0316°W
- Designer: Adolph Alexander Weinman
- Type: Memorial
- Material: Marble
- Dedicated date: October 26, 1947
- Dedicated to: Oscar Straus

The Oscar S. Straus Memorial in Washington, D.C., commemorates the accomplishments of the first Jew to serve in the cabinet of a U.S. president. Oscar Solomon Straus was Secretary of Commerce and Labor under President Theodore Roosevelt from 1906 to 1909. The memorial is a marble fountain located in the Federal Triangle on 14th Street between Pennsylvania Avenue and Constitution Avenue, Northwest, Washington, D.C. It is located in front of the Ronald Reagan Building and International Trade Center.

The fountain was designed by Adolph Alexander Weinman, funded with a public subscription beginning in 1929, and dedicated on October 26, 1947. In the center of the memorial is the massive fountain with the inscription "statesman, author, diplomat" and to each side are two groups of statues, one called Justice (to symbolize the religious freedom which allowed a Jew to serve in such a position of authority) and the other Reason (to symbolize the capitalism and labor efforts put forth by Straus).

It was rededicated on October 26, 1998.

The Justice portion of the memorial which celebrates the "inherent right" to worship.

Reason

Reason

Justice

== See also ==
- List of public art in Washington, D.C., Ward 6
