= The Progress of Railroading =

Public artworks in Washington, DC

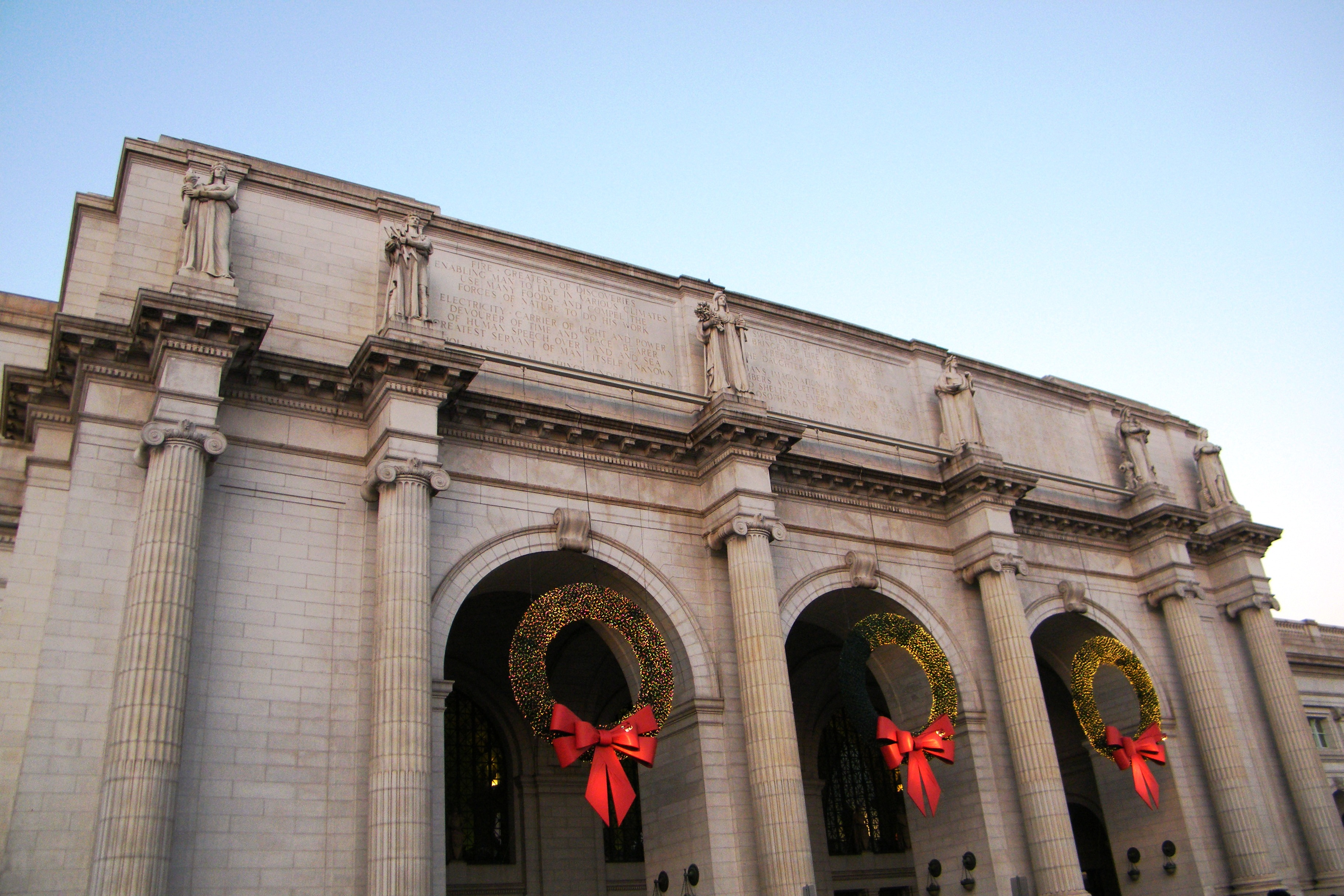
- Artist: Louis Saint-Gaudens
- Year: 1908
- Type: Granite
- Dimensions: 18 ft (5.5 m) each for 6 figures
- Location: Washington, D.C., United States; 38°53′49.3″N 77°0′23.17″W
- Owner: Union Station

The Progress of Railroading is a group of public artworks designed by American artist Louis Saint-Gaudens and sculpted by Italian stonemason Andrew E. Bernasconi. The collection of six allegorical sculptures was created between 1909 and 1911, and are currently located at Union Station in Washington, D.C., United States. The statues depict Greco-Roman deities and thinkers meant to symbolically represent concepts related to rail transport in the United States.

== Description ==
On the main entrance facade of Union Station, six granite statues, each 18 feet tall, are placed atop columns that decorate the three archways composing the building's main pavilion. The figures are paired to represent overarching concepts related to rail transportation: the western pair represents the major elemental forces that operate the railways; the eastern pair represents the industries most aided by rail transportation; and the central pair symbolizes the more abstract concepts that allowed the creation of rail travel. Moving from west to east, these six figures and what they represent are:

- Prometheus – Fire
  - The Titaness (Note: Possibly to provide balance between male and female figures, the traditionally male Prometheus is depicted as female.) is shown wearing a flaming headdress and holding a large torch in her arms.
- Thales – Electricity
  - The philosopher wears a crown of lightning, while holding a bundle of lightning bolts in his left hand and a lump of coal in his right.
- Themis – Freedom
  - The goddess is wearing a Phrygian cap and holding a sword in her left hand, with a bundle of olive branches in her right arm.
- Apollo – Imagination
  - The god wears a crown of laurels, holding an open scroll in his left arm and a pen in his right hand.
- Ceres – Agriculture
  - The goddess, wearing a diadem of intertwined wheat stalks, holds a bundle of wheat in her left arm and a sickle in her right hand.
- Archimedes – Mechanics
  - The engineer's left hand is resting on a sledgehammer, while he holds a large compass in his right.

Each of these statues correlates to a segment of the three inscriptions at the top of each archway, each concluding with an additional statement tying together the three pairs.

The western archway is inscribed:

FIRE – GREATEST OF DISCOVERIES
ENABLING MAN TO LIVE IN VARIOUS CLIMATES
USE MANY FOODS – AND COMPEL THE
FORCES OF NATURE TO DO HIS WORK

ELECTRICITY – CARRIER OF LIGHT AND POWER
DEVOURER OF TIME AND SPACE – BEARER
OF HUMAN SPEECH OVER LAND AND SEA
GREATEST SERVANT OF MAN – ITSELF UNKNOWN

THOU HAST PUT ALL THINGS UNDER HIS FEET

The center is inscribed:

SWEETENER OF HUT AND OF HALL
BRINGER OF LIFE OUT OF NAUGHT
FREEDOM O FAIREST OF ALL
THE DAUGHTERS OF TIME AND THOUGHT

MAN'S IMAGINATION HAS CONCEIVED ALL
NUMBERS AND LETTERS – ALL TOOLS VESSELS
AND SHELTERS – EVERY ART AND TRADE – ALL
PHILOSOPHY AND POETRY – AND ALL POLITIES

THE TRUTH SHALL MAKE YOU FREE

The eastern archway is inscribed:

THE FARM – BEST HOME OF THE FAMILY – MAIN
SOURCE OF NATIONAL WEALTH – FOUNDATION OF
CIVILIZED SOCIETY – THE NATURAL PROVIDENCE

THE OLD MECHANIC ARTS – CONTROLLING NEW
FORCES – BUILD NEW HIGHWAYS FOR GOODS
AND MEN – OVERRIDE THE OCEAN – AND MAKE
THE VERY ETHER CARRY HUMAN THOUGHT

THE DESERT SHALL REJOICE AND BLOSSOM
AS THE ROSE

Extending on either side of the central pavilion are additional archways, each with two eagles at the top flanking additional inscriptions. The inscription above the westernmost archway is a quote from Samuel Johnson:

HE THAT WOULD BRING HOME THE
WEALTH OF THE INDIES MUST CARRY
THE WEALTH OF THE INDIES WITH HIM
SO IT IS IN TRAVELLING – A MAN
MUST CARRY KNOWLEDGE WITH HIM
IF HE WOULD BRING HOME KNOWLEDGE

Above the easternmost archway, the inscription is composed of two quotes - one from William Shakespeare and John Fletcher's play Henry VIII, and the other from James Russell Lowell:

LET ALL THE ENDS THOU AIMEST AT BE
THY COUNTRY'S – THY GOD'S – AND TRUTH'S

BE NOBLE AND THE NOBLENESS THAT
LIES IN OTHER MEN – SLEEPING BUT
NEVER DEAD – WILL RISE IN MAJESTY
TO MEET THINE OWN

An additional inscription can be found on the northeastern side of this archway, also composed of two quotes - one attributed to Homer, and the other to Ralph Waldo Emerson:

WELCOME THE COMING
SPEED THE PARTING GUEST

VIRTUE ALONE IS SWEET SOCIETY
IT KEEPS THE KEY TO ALL
HEROIC HEARTS AND OPENS YOU
A WELCOME IN THEM ALL

== Creation process ==
When the Station was being constructed debate erupted regarding "who" the figures would be or represent. Historical American figures were considered, however, they did not fit into the Baroque architecture of the building, therefore allegorical figures were chosen. Many people were consulted regarding what figures to have St. Gaudens sculpt including Charles W. Eliot, the former president of Harvard University.

== Condition ==
The Progress of Railroading sculptures were surveyed in 1994 by the Smithsonian's Save Outdoor Sculpture! program and was described as needing treatment.

== See also ==
- List of public art in Washington, D.C., Ward 6
