= Ameritas =

Mutual insurance company

Ameritas Life Insurance Corp.
- Industry: Insurance
- Founded: 1887; 139 years ago
- Headquarters: Lincoln, Nebraska, United States
- Products: Insurance; Employee benefits; Financial services
- Website: www.ameritas.com

Ameritas Life Insurance Corp. (established in 1887 as Old Line Bankers Life Insurance Company of Nebraska) is a mutual insurance company. It is owned by Ameritas Mutual Holding Company, headquartered in Lincoln, Nebraska, United States. The company includes Ameritas Mutual Holding Company (AMHC) and Ameritas Holding Company (AHC), as well as Ameritas Life Insurance Corp. of New York.

== History ==
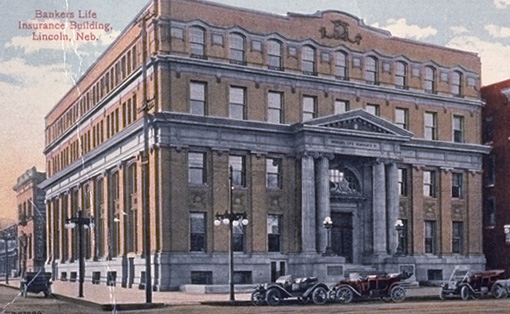
Bankers Life Insurance building Lincoln, NE

In 1984, Ameritas was mostly selling life insurance, with assets of less than $1 billion, and about 500,000 customers.

In 1999, Ameritas Life Insurance Corp. merged with Acacia Mutual Holding Company. The latter had been formed in 1997 when Acacia Life Insurance Company of Washington, D.C., converted from a mutual life insurance company to a stock company wholly owned by a mutual insurance holding company. The company formed by the merger of the Acacia and Ameritas holding companies was named the Ameritas Acacia Mutual Holding Company.

In 2005, Ameritas merged with The Union Central Life Insurance Co. of Cincinnati, forming Unifi Mutual Holding Co. In 2006, The Ameritas Acacia Cos. merged with Union Central Life Insurance of Lincoln. In 2014, Union Central, still part of Ameritas, was being sued for allegedly overlooking an agent's ponzi scheme.

Ameritas rebranded in 2012. It also merged at one point with Acacia Life Insurance Company. In 2013, it changed its name back from Summit Investment Advisors to Ameritas. Also in 2013, Ameritas Life Insurance Corp. sold Acacia Federal Saving Bank to Stifel Bank & Trust. In 2014, Ameritas Employees Credit Union and MembersOwn Credit Union both merged. In September 2014, Ameritas finished a new office building in Forest Park to house around 350 workers, also remodeling a nearby building to house 225 Ameritas employees. Nationally, Ameritas had 2,300 employees at that time. The company began a renovation of its Nebraska location in 2015.

In 2017, a judge ruled that Ameritas had no right to payment from a broker's bond after the broker was caught stealing from clients. Ameritas had sued Federal Life alleging breach of contract. Ameritas partnered with Nelnet on a student loan repayment program in 2017.

In July 2019 and August 2019, a data breach at Ameritas was reported to possibly expose customer info.

It has the sixth-largest property tax in Lincoln in 2019. Ameritas announced a public finance team, to be responsible for municipal bond financing, in September 2019.

In January 2020, William W. Lester succeeded JoAnn M. Martin as CEO, after Martin became CEO in 2009. Martin became CEO of both Ameritas Mutual Holding Company and Ameritas Holding Company, and chair of Ameritas Life Insurance Corp on January 10. On January 1, 2010, Ameritas Acacia Mutual Holding Company merged with the Union Central Mutual Holding Company of Cincinnati, Ohio, and became the UNIFI Company. Union Central Life was originally established as a mutual life insurance company in 1867, and it had formed its own mutual insurance holding company in 2005. UNIFI changed its name to Ameritas Mutual Holding Company. In 2014, Union Central Life and Acacia Life merged into Ameritas Life.

In September 2021, Ameritas Life Insurance Corp. announced the acquisition of BlueStar Retirement Services, Inc. BlueStar Retirement Services operates as a subsidiary of Ameritas.

Ameritas announced in July 2022 that the headquarters on O Street in Lincoln, Nebraska, would undergo renovations. The move was prompted by a shift to a more hybrid work environment, which includes consolidating all Lincoln-based employees at the newly renovated headquarters upon the project's completion. Currently, Ameritas operates out of several locations in the Lincoln metropolitan area.

On Jan. 2, 2024, Robert Jurgensmeier became chief executive officer, while Susan Wilkinson became president and chief operating officer after William Lester announced his retirement. Jurgensmeier has worked in the insurance and financial services industry for more than 25 years and began his career at Ameritas in 2012 as senior vice president and chief actuary, individual division. Wilkinson began her career at Ameritas as a corporate accountant in 1995 and has held many various leadership roles, including executive vice president, chief financial officer and treasurer from 2018-2024.

== Products ==
The company sells life insurance and disability insurance among other retirement products. Ameritas also offers a wide range of financial products and services to individuals, families and businesses.

== See also ==
- List of United States insurance companies
