= Composition for the Axemen =

Public artwork by Ken Wyten

Composition for the Axeman
- Artist: Ken Wyten
- Year: 1989
- Type: Painted steel
- Location: Washington, D.C., United States; 38°54′3.24″N 77°0′24.92″W

Composition for the Axemen is a public artwork by American sculptor Ken Wyten, located at Union Center Plaza at 840 First Street NE in Washington, D.C., United States.

== Description ==
Composition for the Axemen is a steel abstract sculpture painted deep red, a color requested by Sam Rose, who commissioned the work.

=== Acquisition and creation ===
The work was commissioned in 1989 by Sam Rose of real estate development firm Greenebaum & Rose Associates of Washington. Sculptor Ken Wyten had the steel fabricated at McShane Welding Company, as well as additional work on the piece was performed by Kartel Sheet Metal and Allied Industries, all located in Erie, Pennsylvania. The abstract piece was named Composition for the Axemen due to Wyten's love for blues music, "axeman" being a slang term for a guitarist.

=== Installation ===
Upon its arrival to the location it was kept off-site at a nearby vacant lot for fifteen months before being installed in its current location in the fall of 2003.

== About the artist ==
Based out of Erie, Pennsylvania, Wyten's work focuses on the abstract steel sculpture. His works are found in private and public collections, including the Dayton Art Institute.

== See also ==
- List of public art in Washington, D.C., Ward 6
