= Edmond Amateis =

American sculptor and educator

- Born: Edmond Romulus Amateis; February 27, 1897; Rome, Italy
- Died: 1 May 1981 (aged 84); Clermont, Florida, United States
- Education: Beaux-Arts Institute of Design
- Known for: Sculpture
- Notable work: Acacia Griffins

Edmond Romulus Amateis (27 February 1897 – 1 May 1981) was an American sculptor and educator. He is known for garden-figure sculptures, large architectural sculptures for public buildings and portrait busts.

== Life and career ==
Amateis was the son of Louis Amateis (1855−1913), a noted sculptor who had immigrated from Italy in 1883 and became founder of the School of Architecture at George Washington University in Washington D.C. Edmond Amateis received his early education in Washington and took up the study of art at the Beaux-Arts Institute of Design in New York City, in 1915, which were interrupted during World War I by service in the United States Army.

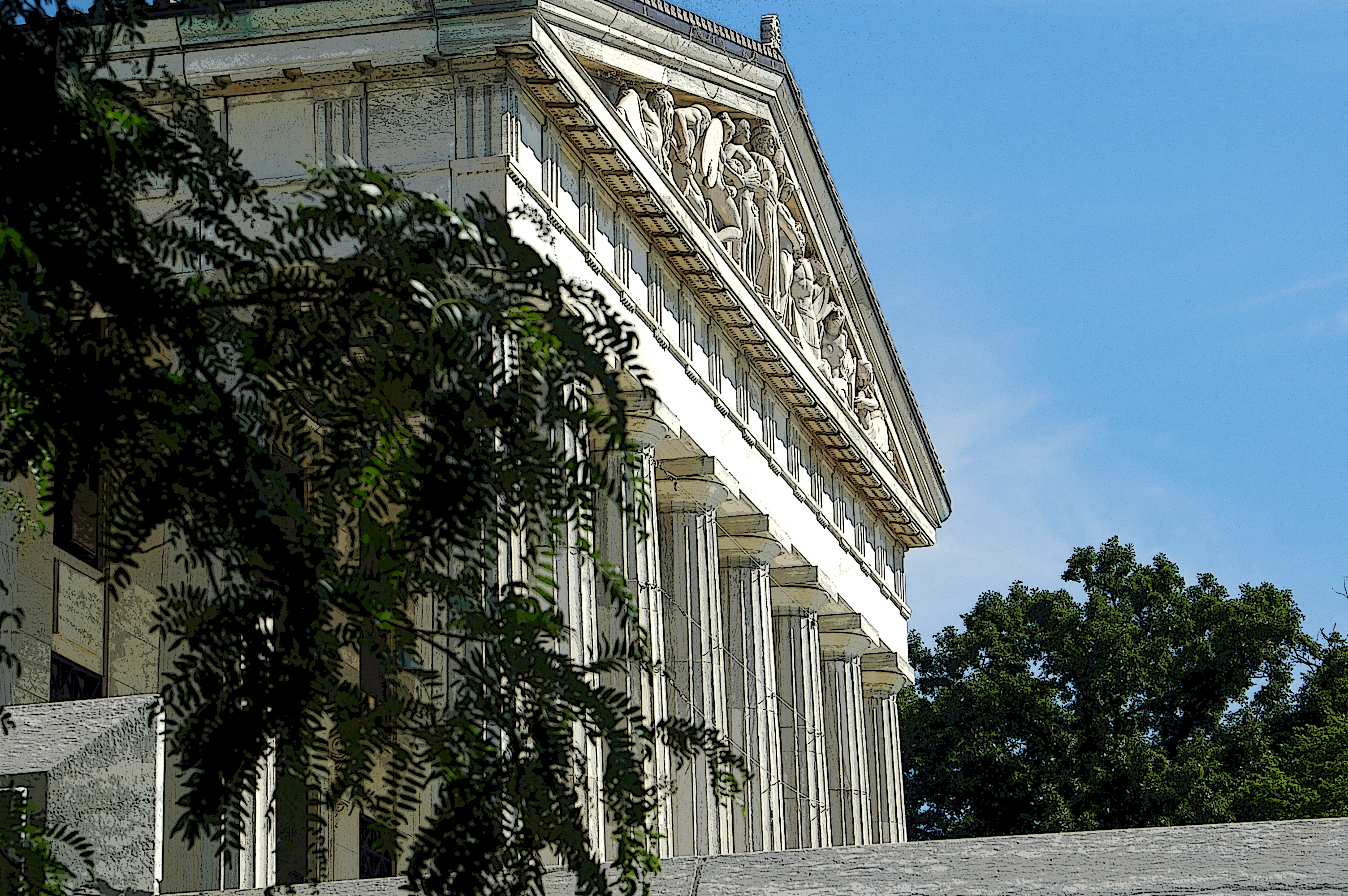
pediment of the Buffalo History Museum

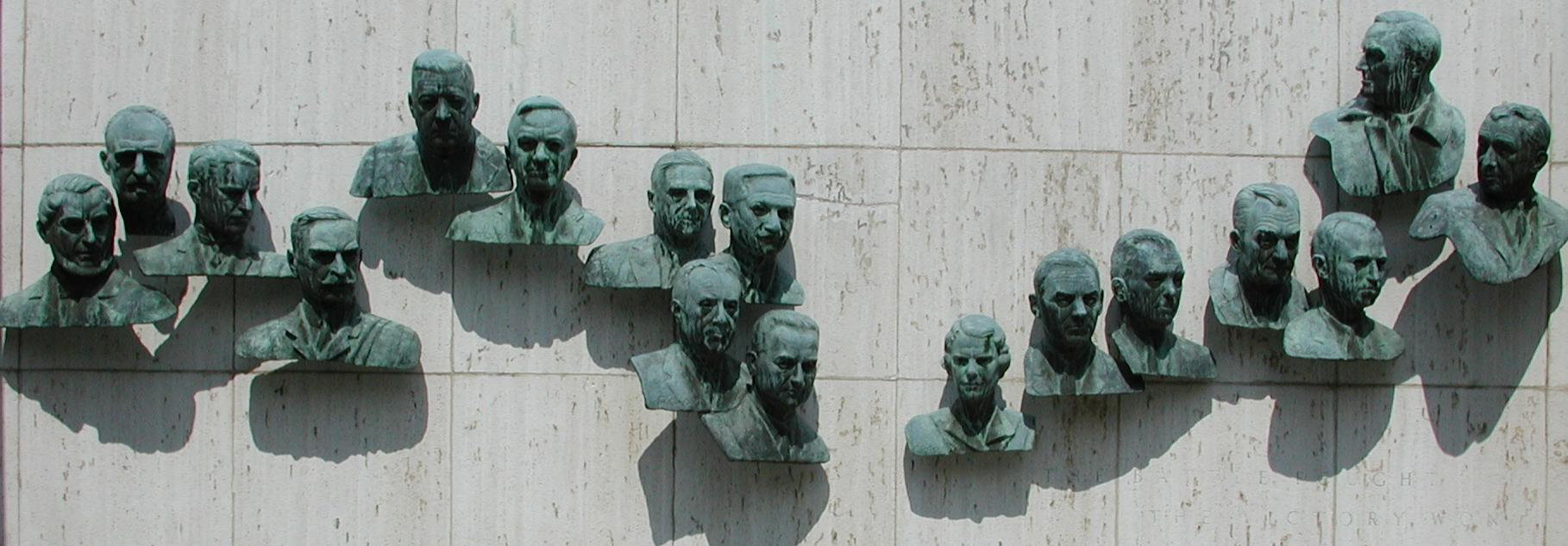
Bronze busts in the Polio Hall of Fame

While in Europe, he spent four months in Paris at the Académie Julian with François Boucher and Paul Landowski as his teachers. When he returned to the United States, he resumed his studies at the Beaux-Arts Institute, combined with work in the studios of Henry Shrady and John Clements Gregory. In 1921 Amateis won the fellowship of the American Academy in Rome for the next three years.

From 1942 to 1944 he was the fifteenth president of the National Sculpture Society. In his later years Amateis lived in Florida, where he developed an interest in the breeding of flowers. A variety of rhododendron is named for him.

== Selected works ==
After his return to the United States he was commissioned with a number of important works of architectural sculpture, such as

- two aquatic war horses for the Baltimore War Memorial
- a pediment and twelve metopes for the Buffalo and Erie County Historical Society Building, now the Buffalo History Museum
- a relief for the Gannett Building in Rochester, New York
- the Great Frieze on the north wall of the Kansas City Liberty Memorial finished in 1935
- the Acacia Griffins for the Acacia Life Insurance Company Building
- a relief and spandrels for the Department of Labor and Interstate Commerce Building, Washington, D.C.
- bronze busts of 15 polio experts plus President Franklin D. Roosevelt and Basil O'Connor for the Polio Hall of Fame in Warm Springs, Georgia, commissioned in 1956 and dedicated in 1958
- a relief for the Kerckhoff Mausoleum, Los Angeles, and a memorial to William M. Davidson at Pittsburgh.

Amateis also designed many fountain and garden figures and also modeled numerous portrait busts and small bronzes.

== Awards ==
In 1929 Summer won the Avery Prize given by the Architectural League, and in 1933, Circe the McClees Prize at the Pennsylvania Academy. He was for a time Associate in Sculpture at Columbia University. He was also a member of the National Sculpture Society and the Architectural League. He was elected as an Associate member of the National Academy of Design in 1936, and made a full member in 1942.

== Gallery ==
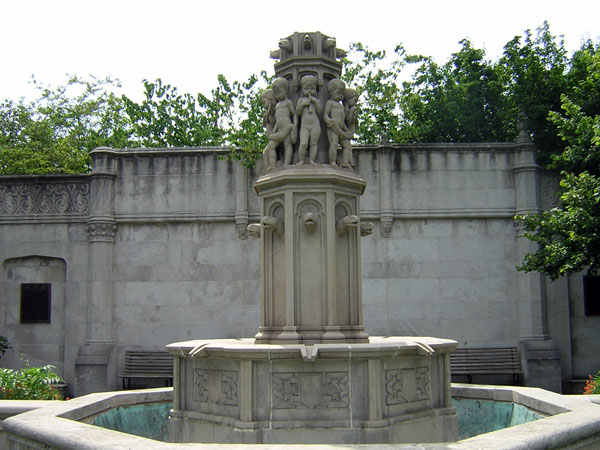
The fountain in Mellon Park, Pittsburgh, Pennsylvania, 1927

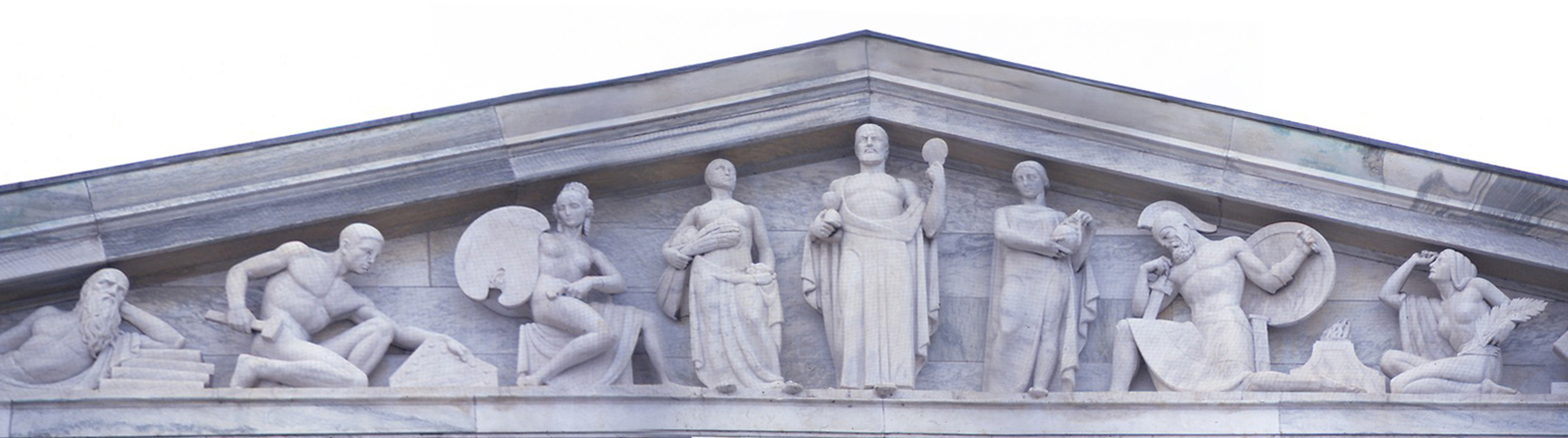
Pediment of the Buffalo and Erie County Historical Society Building in Buffalo, New York

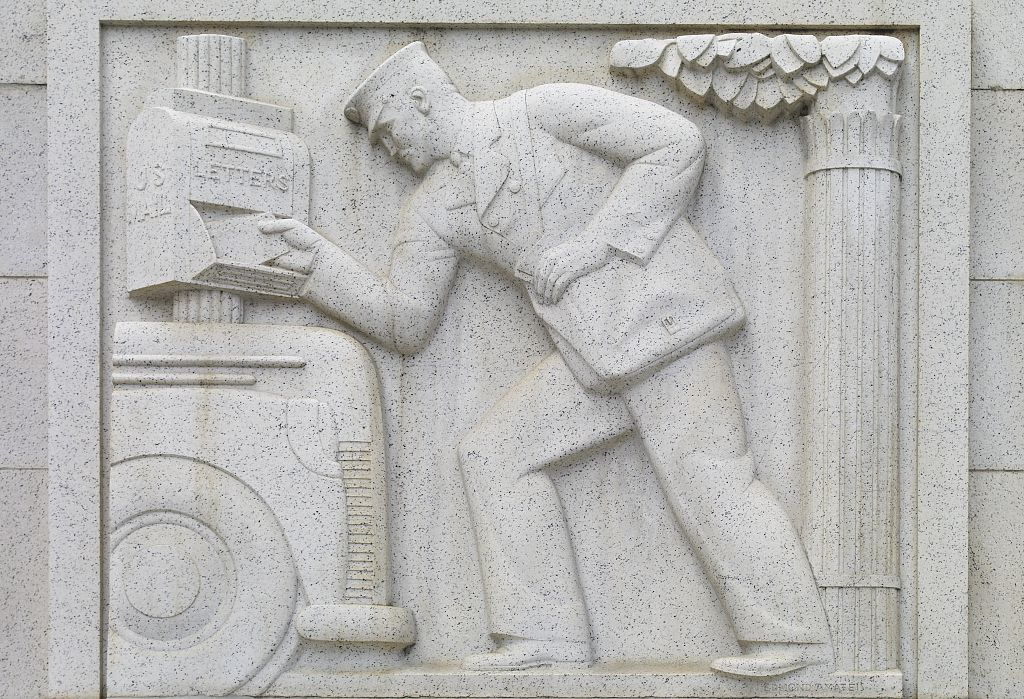
Mail Delivery East, one of four bas-relief sculptures on the Robert N. C. Nix, Sr., Federal Building in Philadelphia, 1937
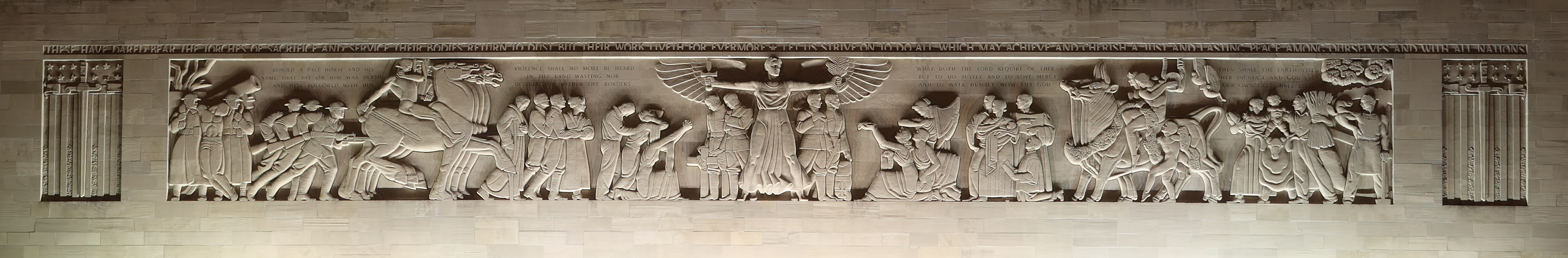
The Great Frieze on the north wall of the Kansas City Liberty Memorial finished in 1935. Main inscription reads "These have dared bear the torches of sacrifice and service. Their bodies return to dust but their work liveth evermore. Let us strive on to do all which may achieve and cherish a just and lasting peace among ourselves and with all nations."
