= Louis Saint-Gaudens =

American artist (1854–1913)

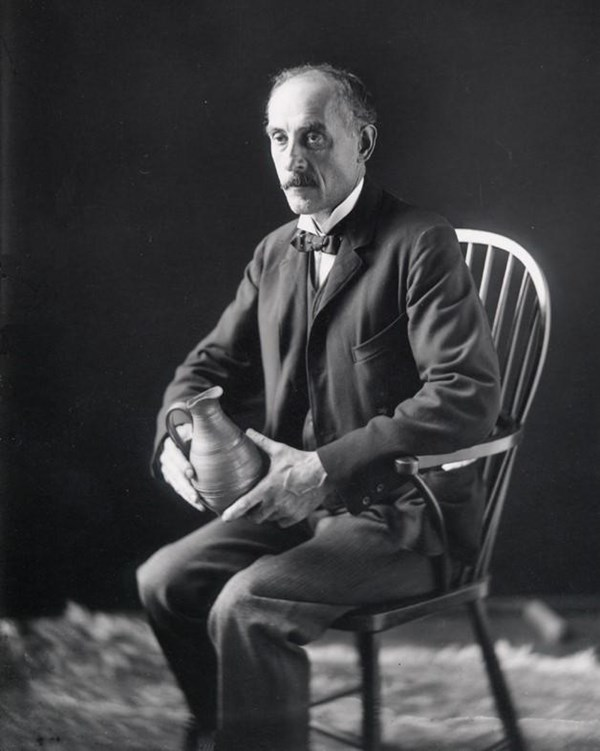
- Born: 1854; New York City, U.S.
- Died: 1913; Cornish, New Hampshire, U.S.
- Education: École des Beaux-Arts
- Known for: Sculpture
- Spouse: Annetta Johnson

Louis Saint-Gaudens (January 1, 1854 – March 8, 1913) was an American sculptor of the Beaux-Arts generation. He was the brother of renowned sculptor Augustus Saint-Gaudens; Louis later changed the spelling of his name to St. Gaudens to differentiate himself from his well-known brother.

== Early life and education ==
Saint-Gaudens was born in New York City to a French-born father, Bernard Paul Ernest Saint-Gaudens, and an Irish-born mother, Mary McGuiness, Louis received his early training as a cameo cutter from his brother, who later assisted him in beginning his art studies in Rome. In 1878, he and his brother Augustus moved to Paris where they shared a studio and attended the École des Beaux-Arts from 1879 to 1880.

== Career ==
In 1898, he returned to the United States, where he settled in Flint, Ohio, and met his future wife, sculptor Annetta Johnson. Their son, Paul Saint-Gaudens, was a master potter who became known for his Orchard Kiln Pottery Works.

In 1900, the family relocated to Cornish, New Hampshire, a mile away from Louis's brother's studio.

For the rest of his life, Louis Saint-Gaudens not only worked as his brother's assistant but also pursued commissions of his own. He sculpted major pieces for the Boston Central Library, the Church of the Ascension and the Brearley School in New York City, Washington Union Station in Washington, D.C., the Alexander Hamilton U.S. Custom House in New York City, St. Louis Art Museum, the Metropolitan Museum of Art and New York Life Insurance Company Building in New York City.

He was a recipient of the Joseph Francis U.S. Congressional Medal and the Benjamin Franklin Centennial Medal in 1906.

Over 50 sculptures by Saint-Gaudens, considered his masterworks, were completed for Washington Union Station in Washington, D.C. He was a member of the National Sculpture Society.

== Legacy ==
Louis Saint-Gaudens died of pneumonia, aged 59, in Cornish, New Hampshire. His home and studio in Cornish, New Hampshire, a former Shaker Meetinghouse, were on the National Register of Historic Places until they were destroyed by fire in 1980.

== Significant works ==
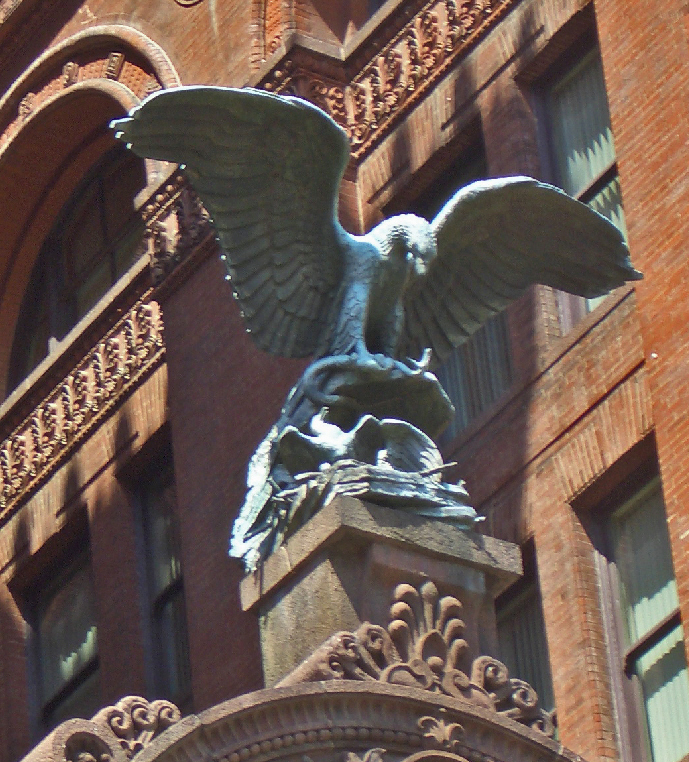
A massive bronze sculpture of an eagle tending a nest of baby eaglets above the entrance to New York Life Insurance Building in Kansas City, Missouri, completed in 1890

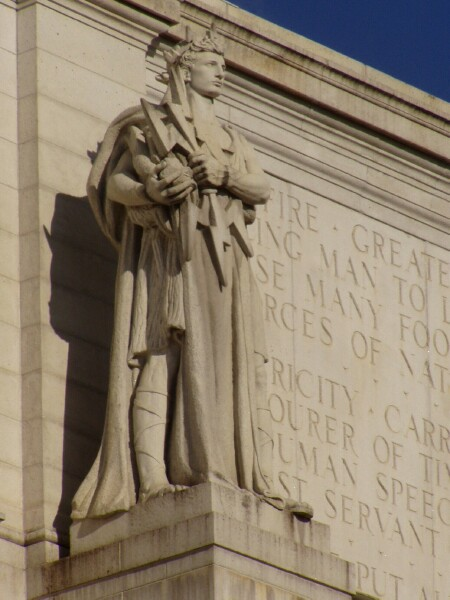
Thales (Electricity), a sculpture from The Progress of Railroading, located at Washington Union Station in Washington, D.C., and completed in 1910

- 1890 Eagle and nest of eaglets - New York Life Insurance Building in Kansas City, Missouri
- 1891 Young St. John the Baptist - Font of Church of the Ascension
- 1894 Lions - Boston Central Library in Boston
- 1896 Statue of Homer - Main Reading Room, Library of Congress in Washington, D.C.
- 1902 Eagles and seal of the State of New York - Roswell P. Flower Monument, in Watertown, New York (with Augustus Saint-Gaudens)
- 1905 Holland Statue, Exterior of Alexander Hamilton U.S. Custom House in New York City
- 1905 Portugal Statue, Exterior of Alexander Hamilton U.S. Custom House in New York City
- 1908 Joseph Francis Medal, United States Mint
- 1912 The Progress of Railroading, Washington Union Station in Washington, D.C.
- 1914 Forty-six Roman Legionnaire Statues - Interior of Washington Union Station in Washington, D.C.
