= Louis St. Gaudens House and Studio =

Historic house in New Hampshire, United States

- U.S. National Register of Historic Places
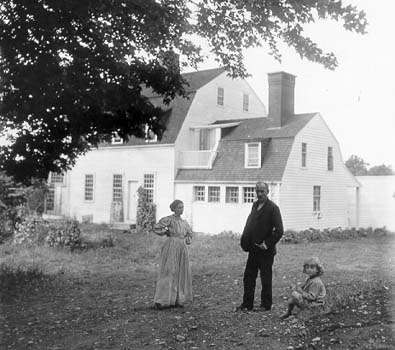
- Louis, Annetta, and Paul Saint-Gaudens stand in front of their home in Cornish, N.H.

- Location within New Hampshire Location within the United States
- Location: Dingleton Hill and Whitten Rds., Cornish, New Hampshire
- Coordinates: 43°30′1″N 72°20′51″W
- Area: 7 acres (2.8 ha)
- Built: 1902
- Architect: Johnson, Moses
- NRHP reference No.: 72000111
- Added to NRHP: November 15, 1972

The Louis St. Gaudens House and Studio was a historic house at Dingleton Hill and Whitten Roads in Cornish, New Hampshire. The 2 1/2-story gambrel-roofed wood-frame structure was designed by Moses Johnson and built in 1793–94 at the Shaker village in Enfield, New Hampshire. At that site the building served as the main meeting space for the Shakers, with a main meeting space on the ground floor, offices on the second floor, and guest living quarters in the attic space. The building was similar in construction to buildings designed by Johnson for the Shaker villages in Canterbury, New Hampshire and Sabbathday Lake, Maine.

The Shakers stopped using the building in 1893, and sold it in 1902 to sculptors Louis St. Gaudens and Annetta Johnson Saint-Gaudens. The St. Gaudens had the building disassembled and moved to its present location, making a number of alterations to it in the process. Due to rot in some framing members, the building was shortened by 8 feet (2.4 m), and a porch was cut into one side. One of the two main entrance doors was relocated to the side of the building, and dormers were added to enlarge the attic space. The lower floors were divided into a living space (living room below, bedrooms above) and a two-story studio space. A 1 1/2-story ell was added in 1904.

In addition to the sculptural studio, Annetta and her son, Paul, operated a pottery kiln, known as "Orchard Kiln" on the property.

St. Gaudens was brother to Augustus St. Gaudens, who was a leading figure in the Cornish Art Colony that flourished in the early 20th century, and whose own Cornish property is now a National Historic Site and National Historic Landmark. This property was occupied by St. Gaudens and his wife until their deaths in the 1950s, and then by their son Paul, a potter.

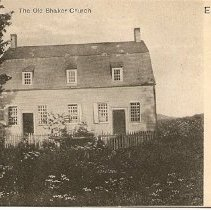
Original Enfield Shaker Meetinghouse; Enfield, New Hampshire

The house was listed on the National Register of Historic Places in 1972. It was destroyed by fire in 1980.

== See also ==
- National Register of Historic Places listings in Sullivan County, New Hampshire
