= Government Printing Office Workers =

Artwork by Armin Scheler

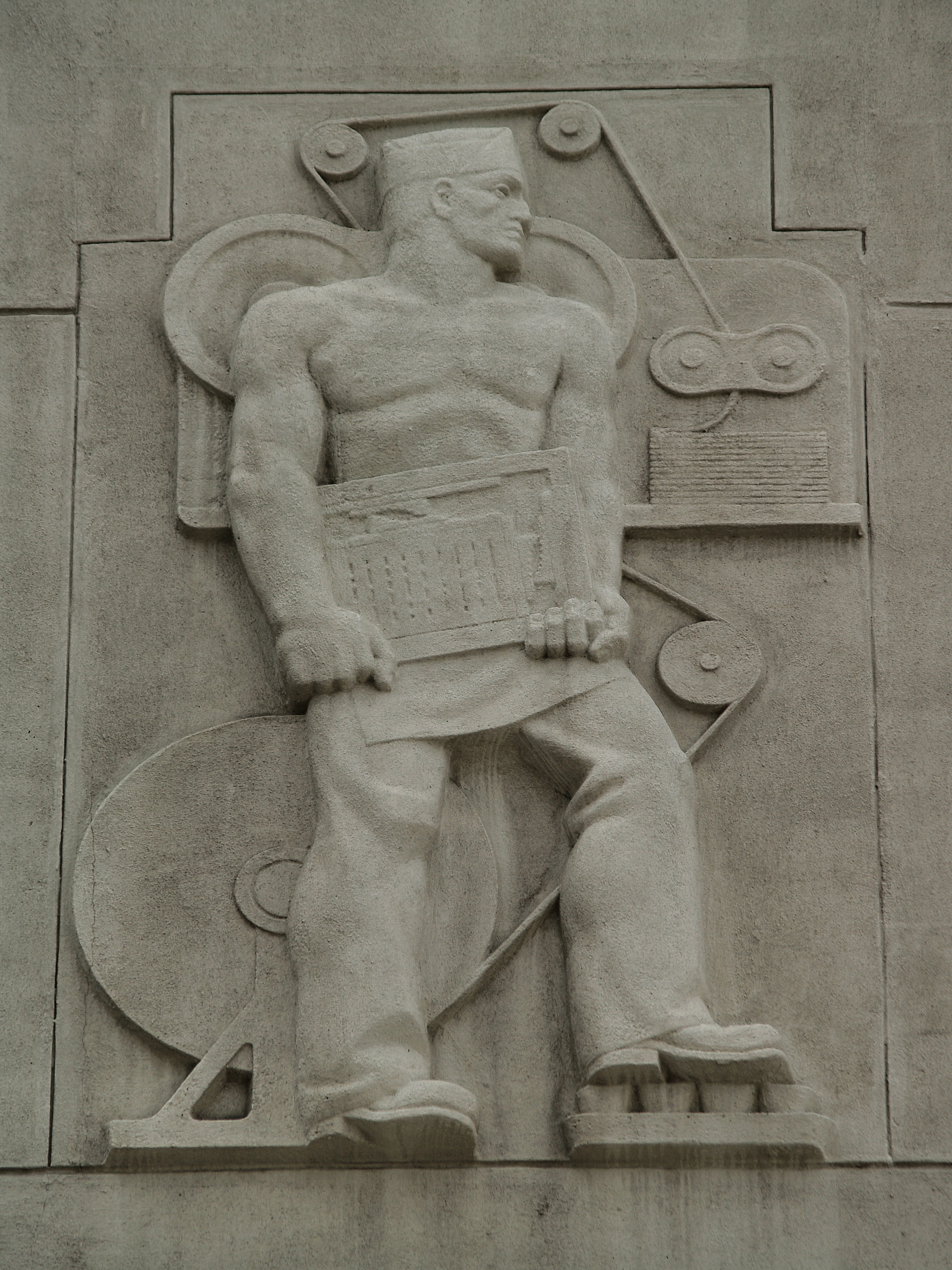
- Artist: Eliot Means
- Year: 1937
- Type: sculpture
- Location: G Street, Washington, D.C.
- Owner: General Services Administration

Government Printing Office Workers is a series of three relief sculptures, located at the Government Printing Office Building, North Capitol Street, and G Street, Northeast, Washington, D.C.

== Design ==
The panels are installed on the third floor of the north side of the building. The left panel shows a standing figure operating a printing press, with rollers, and the right panel shows a standing male figure unloading rolls of paper. They are by Elliott Means. The center panel shows an eagle surmounting the Government Printing Office seal, and is by Armin A. Scheler.

== See also ==
- List of public art in Washington, D.C., Ward 6
