= Trigadilly =

Artwork by Chas Coburn

- Artist: Chas Coburn
- Year: 1991
- Type: Painted steel
- Dimensions: 11 m × 1.2 m × 4.9 m (35 ft × 4 ft × 16 ft)
- Location: Washington, D.C., United States; 38°54′2.79″N 77°0′26.84″W
- Owner: Greenebaum & Rose Associates

Trigadilly is a public artwork by American sculptor Chas Coburn, located at Union Center Plaza, at 820 First Street NE in Washington, D.C., United States. This sculpture was surveyed in 1993 as part of the Smithsonian's Save Outdoor Sculpture! program.

== Description ==
A red, blue and yellow abstract sculpture, it consists of a variety of curved pieces connected together, with selected pieces resting on concrete for balance.

=== Commissioning and creation ===
The sculpture was commissioned by Washington, D.C. property development firm Greenebaum & Rose Associates to be installed at the CNN building. The arrangements and details were handled by the Zenith Gallery of Washington. The name Trigadilly stems from the artists struggle to balance the sculptures heavy weight on the small concrete base, Colburn is quoted as stating the work became "a dilly of a trig problem."

=== Condition ===
Trigadilly was surveyed in 1993 for its condition by the Save Outdoor Sculpture! team and was described as "well maintained."

== About the artist ==
Chas Colburn received his Bachelor of Fine Arts in studio art at the University of Maryland in 1976. After graduating he opened CHALCO Metal Works in Bethesda, Maryland, which served as a custom metalworking shop. Colburn went on to found 3D Metal Parts in Hyattsville, Maryland which designs and makes metal parts for industrial use and serves as his creative studio as well. Most of his work is commissioned or showcased in the collections of regional private and public collections such as:

- International Association of Machinists and Aerospace Workers
- Prince George's Community College
- Lincoln Electric

Colburns work is influenced and inspired by his interest in mathematical relativity, more specifically music, crystallography, chaos theory and general mathematics. His works are designed by using CAD. From Colburn's artist statement:

My interest in creating this kind of artwork is one of provocation. Many times we pass by simple things in our rush for knowledge; and we try to sort out the complex. In this rush to know, it is difficult to see the building blocks of the world around us. I hope that my sculptures will help to set a course for the contemplation of the seemingly simple and inevitable things in our lives as we develop a sense of discovery, and appreciation of our interdependent existence with earth.

His works range in price from $2,000 to $175,000.

== See also ==
- List of public art in Washington, D.C., Ward 6
