= Peace Fountain =

Sculpture and fountain by Greg Wyatt in Manhattan, New York, U.S.

- Closeup of the Peace Fountain
- Interactive map of Peace Fountain
- Location: Manhattan, New York City
- Coordinates: 40.80349°N 73.96307°W
- Designer: Greg Wyatt
- Height: 40 feet (12 m)
- Opening date: 1985

The Peace Fountain is a 40-foot-high (12 m) sculpture and fountain located next to the Cathedral of St. John the Divine in the Morningside Heights section of Manhattan in New York City. It was commissioned in 1985 by Greg Wyatt, sculptor-in-residence at the cathedral.

== Description ==
The sculpture depicts the struggle of good and evil, as well as a battle between the Archangel Michael and Satan. The sculpture also contains the Sun, the Moon, and several animals. Although it is called a fountain, there is currently no water on the site. A plaque at the base contains the following inscription:

Peace Fountain celebrates the triumph of Good over Evil, and sets before us the world's opposing forces—violence and harmony, light and darkness, life and death—which God reconciles in his peace.When the fountain operates, four courses of water cascade down the freedom pedestal into a maelstrom evoking the primordial chaos of Earth. Foursquare around the base, flames of freedom rise in witness to the future. Ascending from the pool, the freedom pedestal is shaped like the double helix of DNA, the key molecule of life. Atop the pedestal a giant crab reminds us of life's origins in sea and struggle. Facing West, a somnolent Moon reflects tranquility from a joyous Sun smiling to the East. The swirls encircling the heavenly bodies bespeak the larger movements of the cosmos with which earthly life is continuous.

Nine giraffes—among the most peaceable of animals—nestle and prance about the center. One rests its head on the bosom of the winged Archangel Michael, described in the bible as the leader of the heavenly host against the forces of Evil. St. Michael's sword is vanquishing his chief opponent, Satan, whose decapitated figure plunges into the depths, his head dangling beneath the crab's claw. Tucked away next to the Sun, a lion and lamb relax together in the peace of God's kingdom, as foretold by the prophet Isaiah.

The fountain is encircled by small bronze animals, sculpted by schoolchildren of a variety of ages, collectively called the Children’s Sculpture Garden. Surrounding the periphery of the sunken plaza in which the fountain sits are plaques, rendered in a style artistically similar to that of the fountain itself, depicting various philosophers, thinkers and artists, most accompanied by a quote by the individual depicted. Despite the Peace Fountain's associating with a Christian (Episcopalian) cathedral, many of the luminaries thus depicted are non-Christian icons, such as Gandhi, Socrates, Albert Einstein and John Lennon, whose image is accompanied by a quote from the lyrics of his song "Imagine".

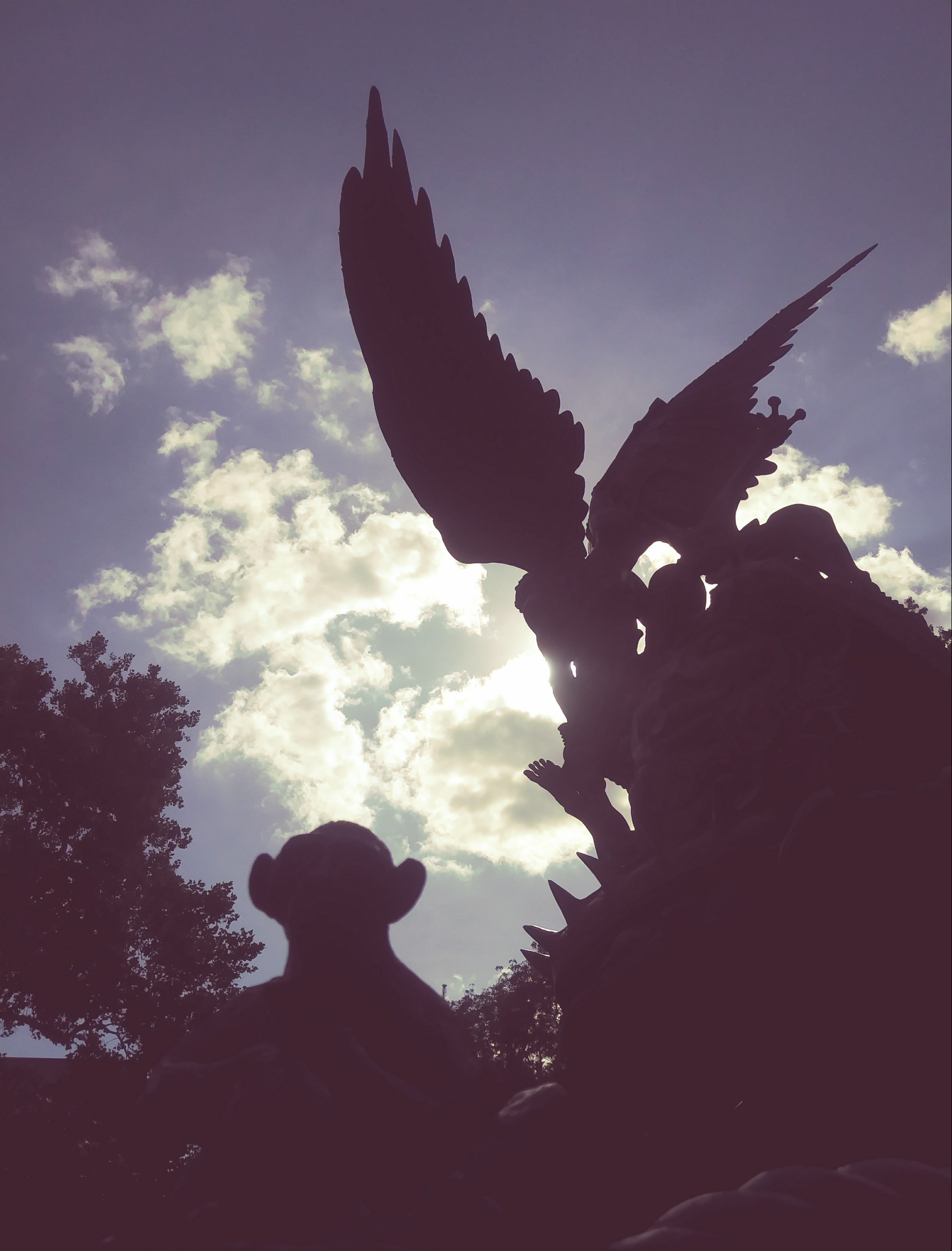
A chimpanzee 6 inches (15 cm) high is one of the small bronze animals encircling the 40 feet (12 m) fountain

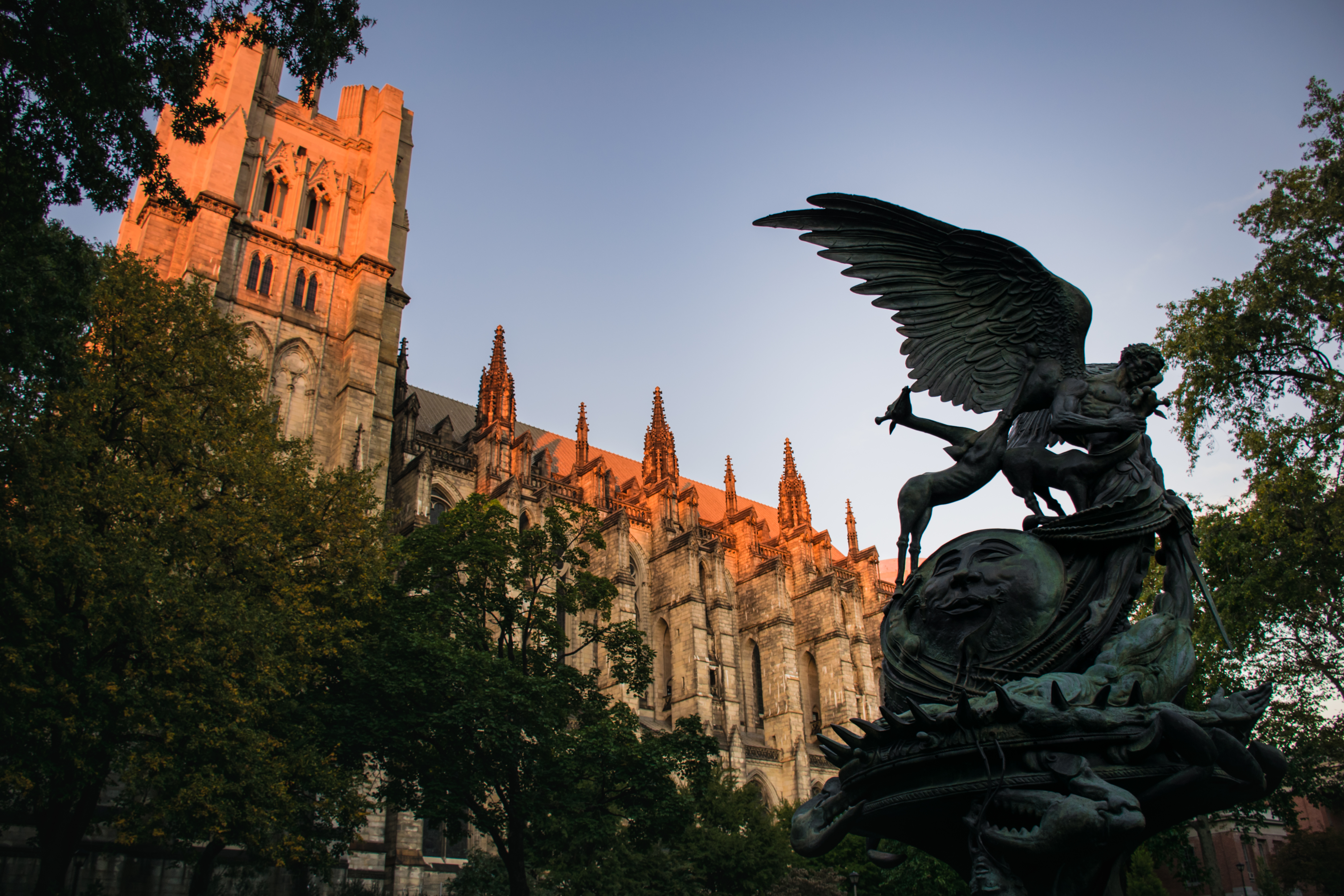
Cathedral of St. John the Divine, exterior with Peace Fountain

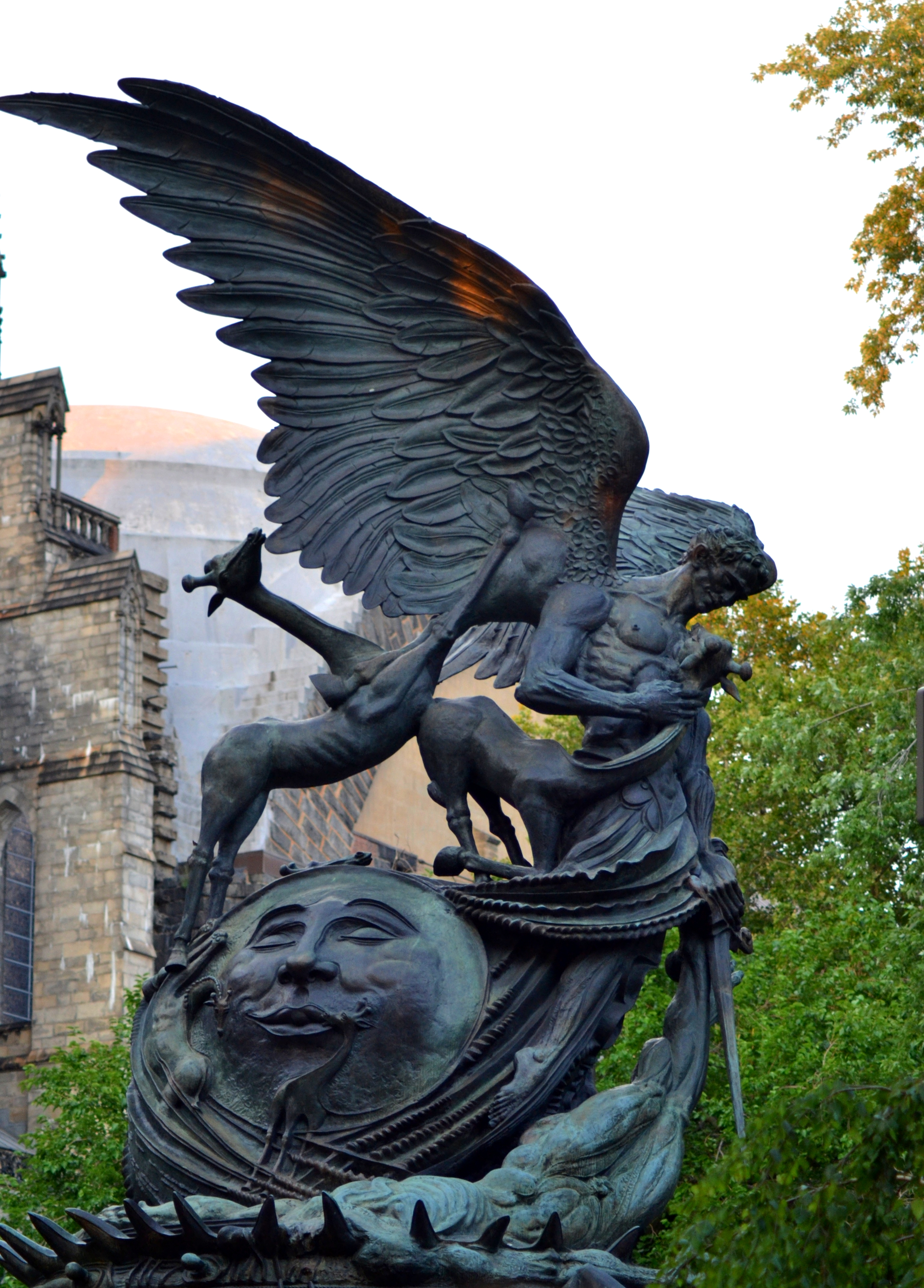
Peace Fountain details

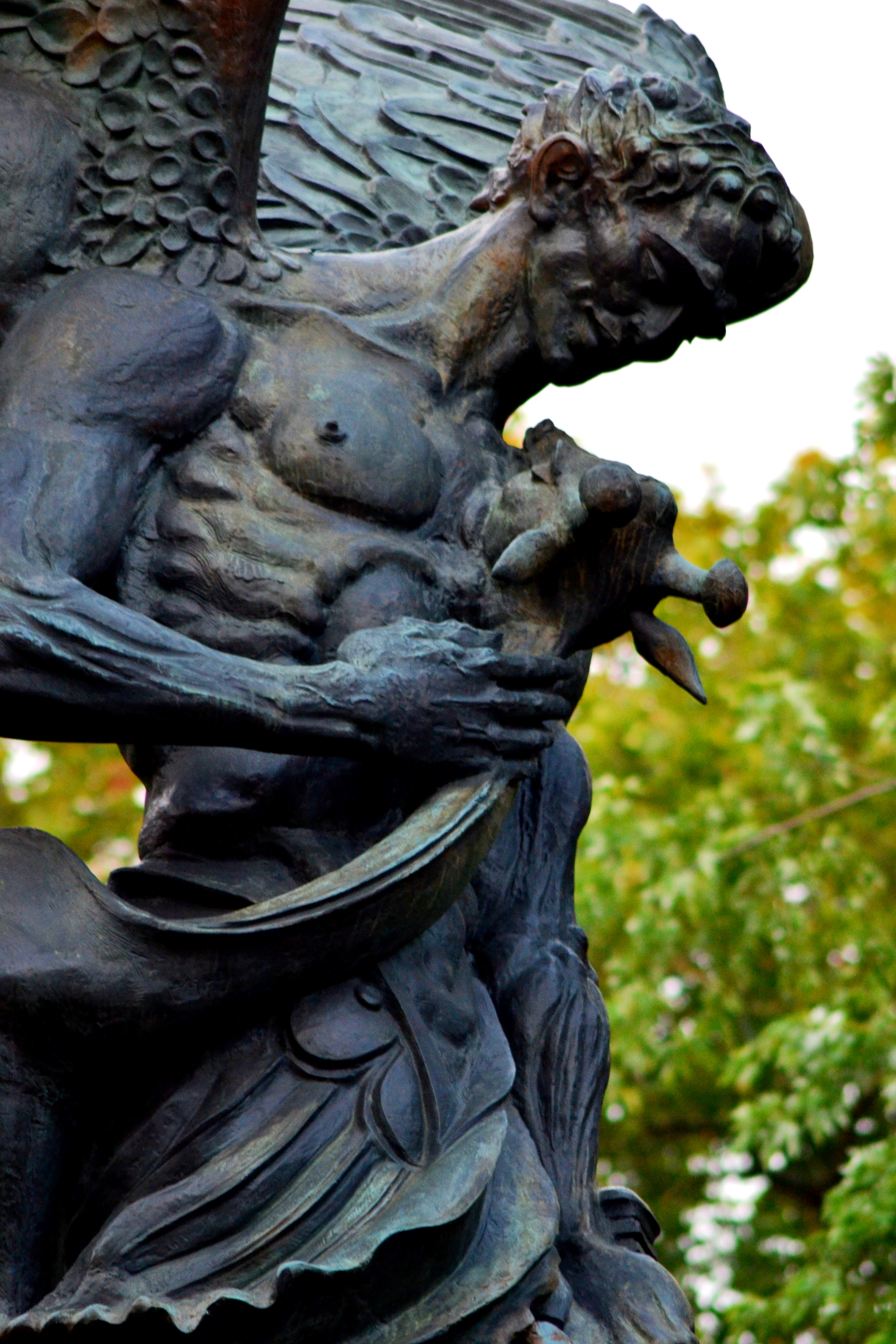
Peace Fountain details

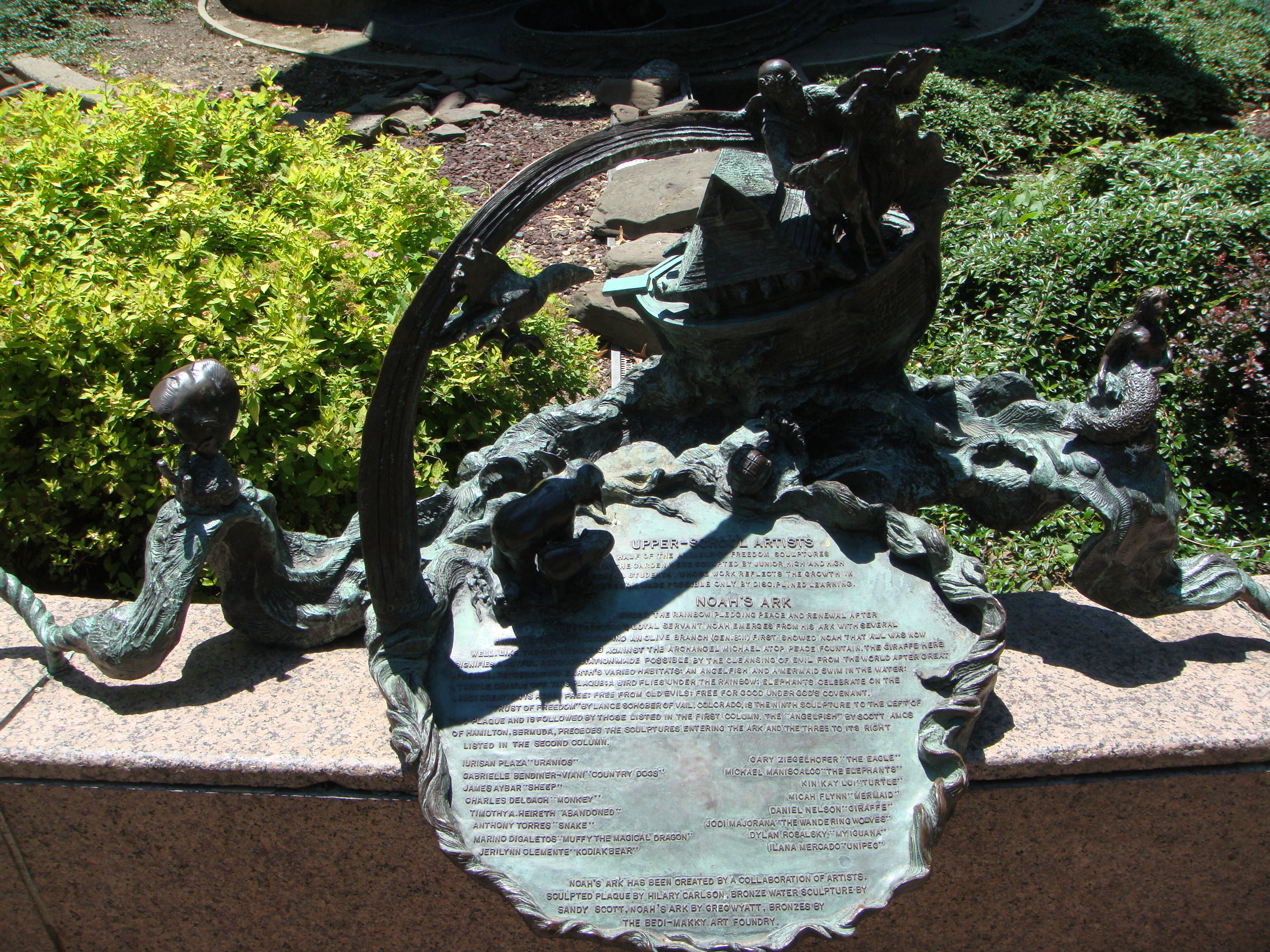
Plaque
