= Greg Wyatt =

American sculptor

Closeup of Peace Fountain (1985)

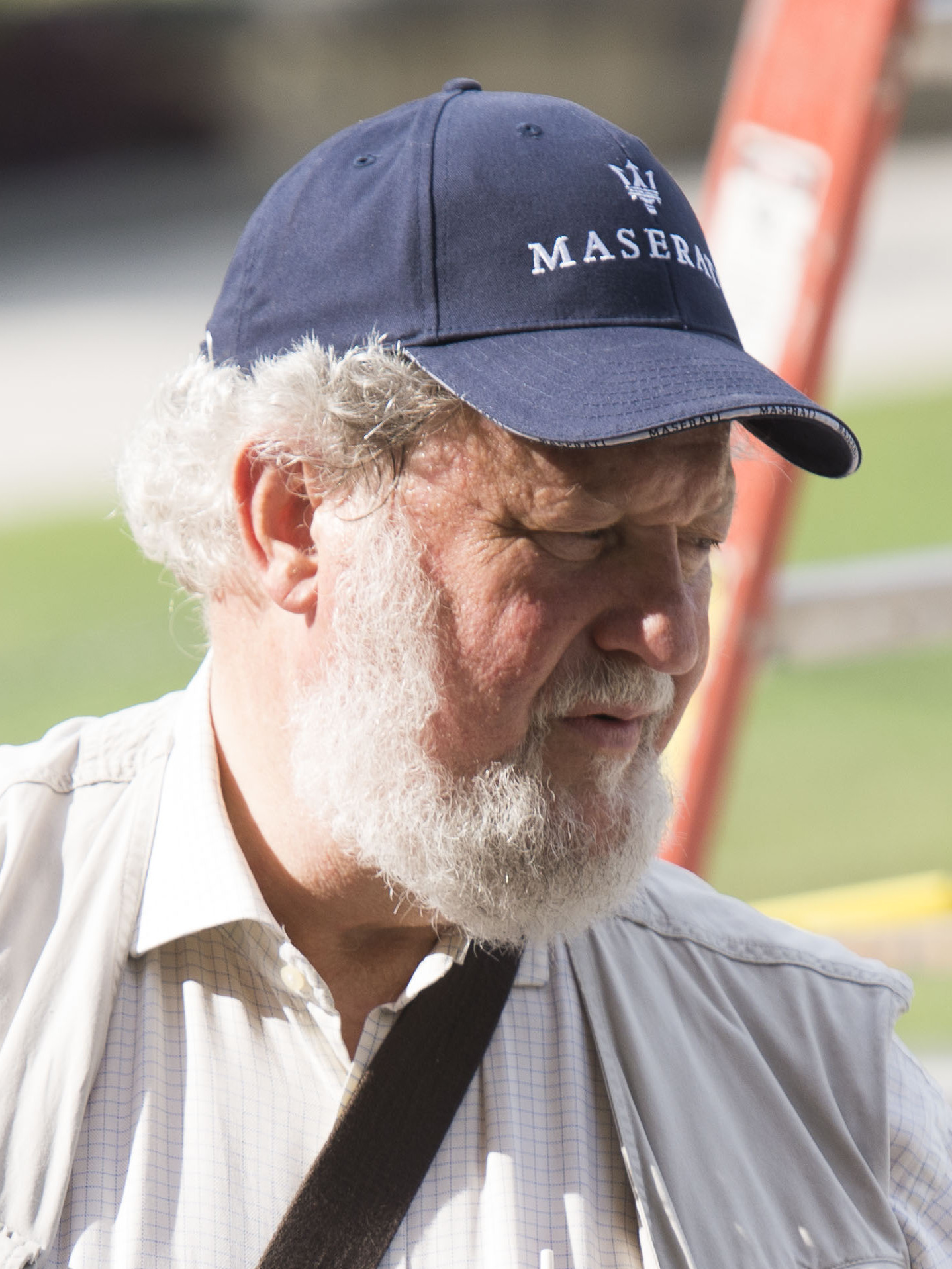
Greg Wyatt in 2016

Greg Wyatt is an American representational sculptor who works primarily in cast bronze, and is the sculptor-in-residence at the Cathedral Church of St. John the Divine in New York City.

Wyatt was born in Nyack, New York and raised in Grand View-on-Hudson, New York. His father was William Stanley Wyatt, a painter and professor of fine arts at Columbia University, Rockland Community College and the City College of New York. Greg Wyatt graduated from Columbia College of Columbia University in 1971 with a Bachelor of Arts degree in Art History. He also attended the National Academy of Design for three years, where he studied figurative sculpture, and received his certificate in sculpture, and earned a master's degree in Ceramic Arts from Columbia Teachers College in 1974. Wyatt has taught at New York University and at Jersey City State College. He is currently a member of the Board of Directors at The American College of the Mediterranean in Aix-en-Provence, France. He is also a member of the Board at Brookgreen Gardens.

Wyatt bases his work on the philosophy of "spiritual realism," merging realistic images and abstract masses of form, space and energy. Professor Sir Stanley Wells, a renowned Shakespearian scholar and emeritus chairman of the Shakespeare Birthplace Trust, says, "I compare Wyatt to Rodin. He's that good." "Wyatt emulates the sculpture of the western world with contemporary vision." His works have been exhibited at the Metropolitan Museum of Art, Harvard University, and Vanderbilt Mansion National Historic Site, among other institutions and collections, and can be seen in more than 20 public spaces in cities from New York to Beijing.

Wyatt has made many corporate commissions, including a bronze statue of J.C. Penney founder James Cash Penney which weighs 3 tons and cost $250,000.

== Notable works ==
- American Bureau of Shipping Eagle (1978) – 65 Broadway, New York City
- Fantasy Fountain (1983) – Gramercy Park, New York City
- Peace Fountain (1985) – The Cathedral of Saint John the Divine, New York City
- "Baryshnikov" (1981), Newington-Cropsey Foundation, Hastings-on-Hudson, NY
- "Two Sculptures" (1994), Newington Cropsey Foundation, Hastings-on-Hudson, NY
- Two Sculptors (1999) – Georgetown University Medical School
- Victory Eagle (1998) and Hippomenes (1999) – Hofstra University
- Bill of Rights Eagle – (1998) Antonin Scalia Law School at George Mason University in Arlington, VA
- Tree of Learning (2000) – Vanderbilt University in Nashville, Tennessee
- The Tempest (1999), Hamlet (2000), King Lear (2001), Julius Caesar (2002), A Midsummer Night's Dream (2005), Falstaff/Henry IV (2006), Macbeth (2007) and The Winter’s Tale {2008} – Shakespeare Birthplace Trust in Stratford-upon-Avon, England
- Soaring American Eagle (2000) – bronze, courtyard of the State Department in Washington, D.C.
- The Price of Freedom (2003) – Visitors Center, Arlington National Cemetery, Arlington, Virginia
- "Soul of the Arts", "Baryshnikov/Spirit of Dance", "Two Peacocks" (2004); La Schola Cantorum de Paris, Paris, France
- The Tempest, Julius Caesar, King Lear and Hamlet (2003), Twelfth Night, Midsummer Night's Dream, Henry IV, Part 2, and Macbeth (2004) – Elizabethan Garden of the Folger Shakespeare Library, Washington, D.C.
- Scholars' Lion (2004) – Columbia University
- "Folger Shakespeare Library" (four study model series), 2005; Beijing University, People's Republic of China
- "Aspire" (2005) Quees Tabe Commission for the Academic and Performing Arts Center, CPCC, Charlotte, NC
- "Novation" (2007), Giardino, Bardini, Florence, Italy
- "Heaven and Hell", "Mitosis", "Dante Among the Flames", "Dante's Inferno" (2008); Casa di Dante, Florence, Italy.
- "Empedocles Bronze Monument Courtyard: Air, Wind, Fire and Water" (2008), Museo Archeologico Regionale di Agrigento, Sicily
- "Moon Face" (2010), Museo Civico di San Gimignano, Siena, Italy
- "Two Rivers" (2010) Museo dell Opera del Duomo di Pisa, Pisa, Italy
- "Beatrice", Tall Torch of Liberty", "Egyptian Fish" (2011) Giardino Scotto, Comune di Pisa, Italy
- "Bathsheba" (2011) Piazza San Agostino, Comune di Arezzo. Italy
- "Gates of Hudson Arch" (2011) Hook Mountain State Park, Palisades Interstate Park Commission, NY
- "Sir Stanley Wells" (2012), Shakespeare Birthplace Trust, The Shakespeare Centre, Stratford-upon-Avon, UK
- "William Shakespeare (portrait relief)", "A Midsummer Night's Dream (bas relief)", "Hermione's Transformation (bas relief), "Macbeth", "Henry IV", "Twelfth Night" (2012); Museo della Tomba di Giulietta, Commune di Verona, Italy
- "Amerigo Vespucci" (2012), Organization of American States, Washington, DC
- "Angel and the Dying Unknown" (2013) Dover Air Force Base, Dover, DE
- "Don Quixote/King Lear" (2014) Universidad de Alcala de Henares, Caracciolos Courtyard, Alcala, Spain/ Fundacion Duques de Soria, Spain
- "Guardian Angel" (2015) Ft. Wright, KY
- "Hudson River School Artists Garden: Thomas cole, Frederic E. Church, Jasper F. Cropsey, Asher B. Duran", (2015) "Albert Bierstadt, Thomas Moran, Sanford Robinson Gifford" (2016); Boscobel House and Gardens, Cold Spring, NY
- "Julius Caesar", "King Lear", "Monocled Man" "Cappuccino Drinker" "Committee of Kings" (2017) Giardino Scotto, Comune di Pisa, Italy

Corporate Collections

- "Olympic Woman" (1996) Avon Products, Inc. New York
- "James Cash Penney Standing" (1992) J.C. Penney Company, Inc. Plano, TX
- "Golden Rule Award" (1982-1992) J.C. Penney Company, Inc. Plano, TX
- "Life Forces" (1993) American Home Products, Pear River, NY/Immunex Corp., Portland, OR
- "A.B.C. Eagle" (1978)

EXHIBITIONS

- The Cathedral of St John the Divine (Jun-Sept 2017), "The Peace Fountain and Animals of Freedom" A Summer of Sculpture at the Cathedral
- U.S. Senate Russel Building Rotunda, United States Congress, Washington, DC. "Albert Bierstadt, Thomas Moran, Sanford Robinson Gifford" 2016
- Embassy of Canada, Washington, DC. "Albert Bierstadt, Thomas Moran, Sanford Robinson Gifford" 2016
- Schola Cantorum, Paris France. "Volcanus", "Arnaud d'Hautrives portrait" 2015
- "Artwalk" Highland Falls, NY. "All Services Guardian Angel" 2015
- Columbus Citizens Foundation, NY/ Waldorf Astoria; "Baryshnikov-in-flight", 2015
- Columbus Citizens Foundation, NY/ Waldorf Astoria; "Luna" 2014
- Organization of American States, Washington, DC; "Luna", "Baryshnikov", "Soul of the Arts" 2014
- Embassy of Canada, Washington, DC; "Homage to Hudson River School of Painting: Four Masters" 2016
- Rayburn Building Foyer, United States Congress, Washington, DC; "Homage to Hudson River School of Painting: Four Masters" 2016
- Porto Empedocle, Sicily. "Empedocle's Water, Earth" 2013
- Rayburn Building Foyer, United States Congress, Washington, DC; "Anger and the Dying Unknown", "World War II Memorial" 2012
- Ft. Monroe, Hamilton, VA; "Anger and the Dying Unknown", "World War II Memorial" 2012
- America Legion Headquarters, Washington, DC; "Angel and the Dying Unknown", "World War II Memorial" 2012
- Museo Etrusco Guarnacci, Volterra, Italy; "Four Empedocles Urns" 2012
- Brookgreen Gardens, Murrels Inlet, SC; " 2011 Rainey Master Sculptor"
- Columbus Citizens Foundation, New York, NY; "Eternal Spring" 2011
- Piazza Signoria, Florence. Italy; "Two Rivers" 2009
- Santuario del Beato Giacomo, Ex Convento del Dominicani. Bitetto, Bari, Italy; "Origini", 2009
- Museo Archeologico Regionale di Agrigento, Sicily; "Empedocles" 2008
- Forte di Belvedere, Florence, Italy. "Burnham Wood" 2007
- Regione Toscana, Florence, Italy; "Burnham Wood" 2007
- Istituto Statale d'Arte di Firenze, Florence, Italy; "Transatlantic Bridges Through Sculpture", 2006
- United States Consulate General, Florence, Italy; "Transatlantic Bridges Through Sculpture", 2004
- Institute of Directors, London, UK; Great Garden of Sculpture Education Program, 2004
- American Embassy International Marketing Center, London, UK; "Global Gardens of Shakespeare Sculpture" 2003
- The Cathedral Church of St. John the Divine, New York, NY; "From Model to Monument"
- Folger Shakespeare Library, Washington, DC; "Shakespeare Bronze Models" 2002
- U.S. Senate Russel Building Rotunda, United States Congress, Washington, DC; "Bill of Rights Eagle" 1995
- Supreme Court, Office of the Chief Justice, Washington, DC; "Bill of Rights Eagle"1995
- U.S. House of Representatives, House Intelligence Committee Anteroom, Washington, DC; "Bill of Rights Eagle" 1995
- National Academy f Design, New York, NY; "Centennial Samuel B. Morse" 1992
- Metropolitan Museum of Art, American Wing, New York, NY. "Bronze Castings" 1991
- Harvard University, Dudley House Gallery and Courtyard, Cambridge, MA; "Novation" 1991
- Bergen Museum of Art and Science, Paramus, NJ; "Solo Exhibition"
