= Acacia Life Insurance Company =

Defunct American insurance company

Acacia Life Insurance Company was established in 1867 as a mutual insurance company, owned by its policyowners. Its headquarters were in Washington, D.C., United States. In 1997, it formed a mutual insurance holding company, Acacia Mutual Holding Company of Washington, D.C. In that process, Acacia Life became a stock life insurance company wholly owned by its parent holding company. Organizationally, Ameritas Acacia Mutual Holding Company became the parent company with ownership of Ameritas Holding Company. The latter company, in turn, became the owner of 100% of the stock of both Ameritas Life Insurance Corporation and Acacia Life Insurance Company, which became stock life insurance companies.

== History ==
Ameritas Life Insurance Corp. merged with Acacia Mutual Holding Company in 1999.

On January 1, 2006, Ameritas Acacia Mutual Holding Company merged with the Union Central Mutual Holding Company of Cincinnati, Ohio and became UNIFI Mutual Holding Company. Union Central Life was originally established as a mutual life insurance company in 1867 and had formed its own mutual insurance holding company in 2005. In 2006, The Ameritas Acacia Cos. merged with Union Central Life Insurance of Lincoln. In 2014, Union Central, still part of Ameritas, was being sued for allegedly overlooking an agent's ponzi scheme.

Ameritas rebranded in 2012 and in 2013, it changed its name back from Summit Investment Advisors to Ameritas. Also in 2013, Ameritas Life Insurance Corp. sold Acacia Federal Saving Bank to Stifel Bank & Trust.

Acacia Life merged into Ameritas Life in 2013.
