= Flint, Ohio =

- Unincorporated community
- Location within the state of Ohio Flint (the United States)
- Coordinates: 40°07′38″N 83°00′21″W
- Country: United States
- State: Ohio
- County: Franklin
- Township: Sharon
- Elevation: 925 ft (282 m)
- Time zone: UTC-5 (Eastern (EST))
  - Summer (DST): UTC-4 (EDT)
- GNIS feature ID: 1040526

Flint is an unincorporated community in Sharon Township, Franklin County, Ohio, United States, located north of downtown Columbus near the intersection of Flint and Park Roads.

== History ==
It was served by stations on the Cleveland, Columbus and Cincinnati Railroad (New York Central system) and Sandusky and Columbus Short Line Railway (Pennsylvania system), which opened through the area in 1851 and 1893, respectively.

== Notable residents ==
- Dick Reynolds, member of the Texas House of Representatives
