= Union Central Life Insurance Company =

Defunct American insurance company

Union Central Life Insurance Company was founded in Cincinnati, Ohio, in 1867. It was established as a mutual insurance company. Among its founders were Norman Wait Harris, founder of Harris Bank.

The company was the developer of Cincinnati's Fourth and Vine Tower, which was known as the Union Central Building upon its completion in 1913. Union Central moved to a new headquarters in Forest Park in 1964.

In 2005, it formed a mutual insurance holding company the Union Central Mutual Holding Company and converted the life insurance company to a stock company. On January 1, 2006, that holding company merged with the Ameritas Acacia Mutual Insurance Holding Company to form the UNIFI Mutual Holding Company. Union Central Life merged into Ameritas Life in 2013.
