= The Bex Eagle =

Sculpture in Washington, D.C., US

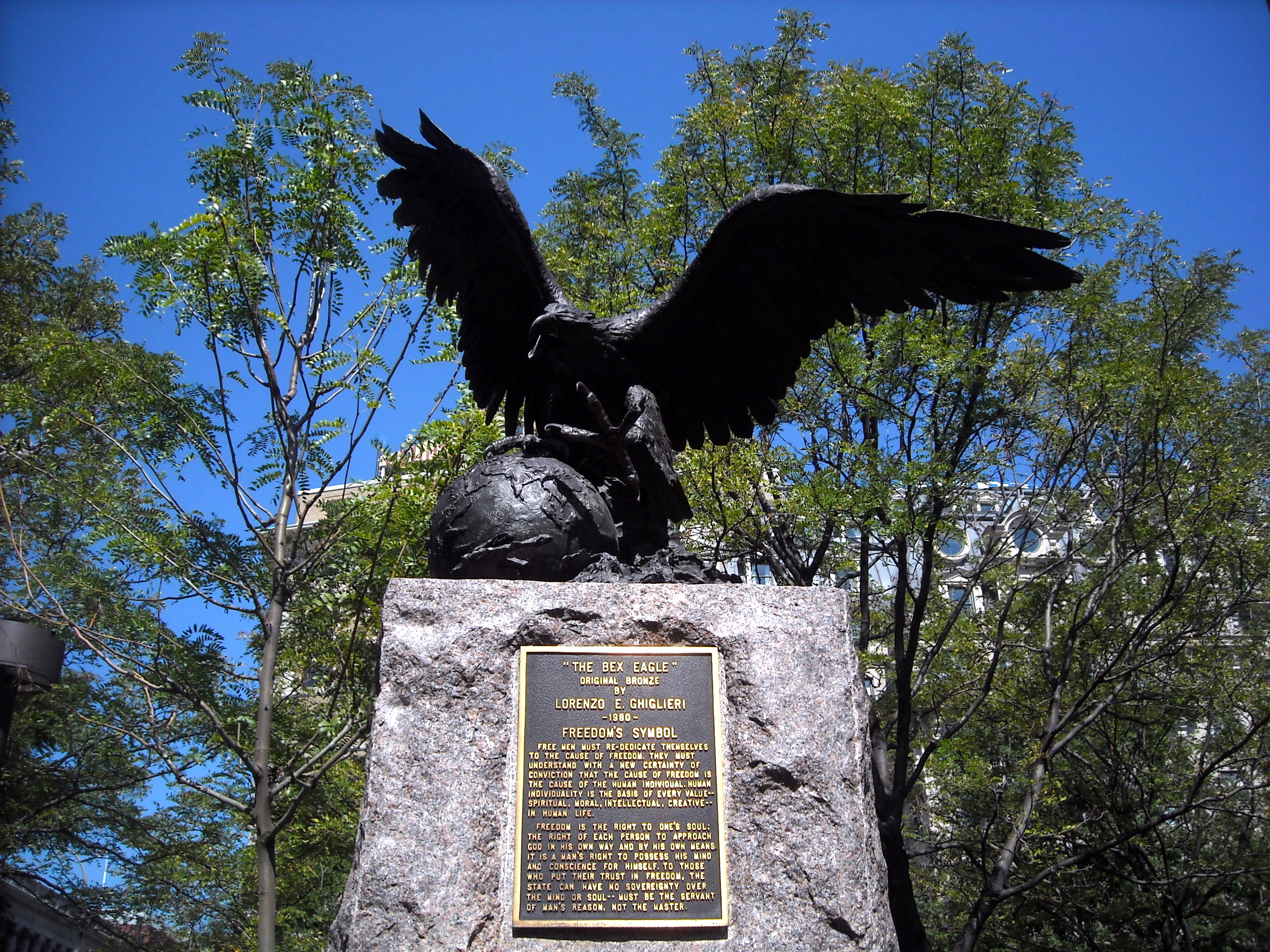
- Statue in 2009
- Artist: Lorenzo Ghiglieri
- Year: 1982
- Type: Bronze, granite
- Dimensions: 1.3 m × 0.84 m (40½ in × 50 in × 33 in)
- Location: Washington, D.C., United States
- Owner: Department of the Interior

The Bex Eagle is a bronze sculpture located in Pershing Park, Washington, D.C.

It was dedicated on May 3, 1982.

== See also ==
- King at Rest
- List of public art in Washington, D.C., Ward 6
