= Brown Bear Car Wash =

American car wash chain

- Company type: Private
- Industry: Automotive
- Founded: 1957
- Founder: Victor Odermat
- Headquarters: Seattle, Washington, United States
- Number of locations: 49 (2021)
- Area served: Washington
- Key people: Victor Odermat (President); Lance Odermat (General Counsel)
- Services: Car washes, Filling stations, Convenience stores
- Website: www.brownbear.com

Brown Bear Car Wash is an American car wash chain based in Washington state. Founded in Seattle in 1957, it is the 12th largest car wash chain in the United States with 49 locations as of 2021.

== History ==
=== Early history ===
Brown Bear Car Wash was founded in 1957 by Victor Odermat, a former U.S. Marine, with a single location in Seattle. Odermat subsequently expanded with the opening of additional locations in Western Washington and Spokane.

Under Odermat's leadership, the company became known for its formal employer–employee relations. Staff were expected to address Odermat with the honorific "Mister", a style which he reciprocated; when waiting on customers, employees were required to assume a position of military parade rest; uniforms consisting of white shirts, black slacks, and black neckties were required. A 2005 newspaper report characterized Brown Bear management as displaying a "clear, concise, authoritarian ethic".

During the 1980s, Brown Bear's major competitor in the Puget Sound region's car wash market was another local chain, Elephant Car Wash, with Brown Bear primarily offering self-service washes and Elephant providing automatic washes. According to a 1984 reader survey by the Seattle Times on the "Best Car Wash" in the region, the "pink elephant and the brown bear fought this one out, but the elephant came out in the wash".

=== Tosco lease ===
In 1995, Odermat leased the Brown Bear chain to Tosco Corporation. Following disagreements with Tosco over business practices—including its decision to abandon the chain's employee uniforms—Odermat terminated the leases and reassumed control of the company in 2003. Odermat reintroduced military-style practices and uniforms, which caused some staff to quit, though in several cases long-time employees who had left the company during Tosco management returned.

The interior of an automated car wash operated by Brown Bear Car Wash seen in 2021

=== 2000s ===
By 2007, the company operated 38 car washes, some of which included gas stations and convenience stores. That year, Odermat was inducted into the Car Wash Hall of Fame. In 2018, viewers of Evening Magazine voted the chain the "Best Car Wash in Western Washington". It was ranked as the 12th largest car wash chain in the United States in 2018.

In 2020, during the COVID-19 pandemic, the company briefly shuttered its locations for six weeks. During the pandemic, Odermat was named to a task force to devise Washington state government guidelines for operation of car washes.

== Operations ==
=== Locations ===
In 2021 Brown Bear Car Wash had 49 automatic and self-service car washes in Washington state which were located in five of its 39 counties: King County, Pierce County, Snohomish County, Kitsap County, and Spokane County. In 2007, the company said it had no plans to expand outside Washington state.

Some Brown Bear Car Wash locations include filling stations and convenience stores. Filling stations are franchised from Chevron; the company is the largest Chevron retailer in Washington. Its convenience stores operate under the name Hungry Bear Market.

==== Bear art ====
In 2009, the company began a process of beautifying its physical properties with the installation of life-sized bronze grizzly bear statues at each of its locations. Most sites have a family group consisting of a female bear and three cubs installed, though select locations are adorned with a towering, 4,000-pound (1,800 kg), 12-foot (3.7 m) sculpture of a rearing male grizzly. The sculpture molds were designed by Lorenzo Ghiglieri, whose work has also been installed at the Royal Palace of Madrid and the White House. According to Odermat, he decided to commission Ghiglieri for the statues after seeing his art during a trip to Oregon.

=== Management ===
As of 2021, the president of Brown Bear Car Wash is Victor Odermat. Odermat's son, Lance Odermat, is the company's vice president and general counsel.

== See also ==
- Quick Quack Car Wash
