= United States World War I Centennial Commission =

Government agency

The United States World War I Centennial Commission was created by an Act of Congress in 2013. This Act was passed in order to honor and recognize the centennial of America's involvement with World War I. The Commission is in charge of planning, developing, and executing programs, projects, and activities to commemorate the centennial of World War I. The Commission also develops educational programs for a variety of audiences, organizes events to commemorate America's involvement in the War, and will establish a National World War I Memorial in Washington, D.C. The Pritzker Military Museum and Library is the founding sponsor of the Commission. The Starr Foundation is supporting sponsor of the Commission.

Members of the Commission were appointed by the President and the leaders of the Senate and the House of Representatives, as well as the American Legion, the Veterans of Foreign Wars, and the National World War I Museum. The Commissioners serve without pay.

== U.S. Involvement in World War I ==
When World War I broke out in Europe during the summer of 1914, the United States stuck to a strict policy of neutrality. On August 4, 1914, President Woodrow Wilson declared to Congress that, "The United States must be neutral in fact, as well as in name, during these days that are to try men's souls. We must be impartial in thought, as well as action." However, after years of unrestricted German submarine warfare, the sinking of the Lusitania, the Black Tom explosion, and the public release of the Zimmermann Telegram, the United States could no longer remain neutral in the international conflict. On April 6, 1917, Congress officially declared war against Germany and joined the Allied forces.

Led by General John J. Pershing, the American Expeditionary Forces arrived in Europe in June 1917. American forces participated in several major battles, most notably the Meuse-Argonne offensive. This became a major turning point in the War, which had been at a stalemate for years. The War would finally end a year later on November 11, 1918. Over 4.7 million American men and women would serve, and more than 116,000 American soldiers, or "doughboys" as they were commonly referred to, would pay the ultimate sacrifice.

== Design Competition and National Memorial in D.C. ==
In 2014, Pershing Park was officially designated as the location for a National World War I Memorial. Pershing Park is located on Pennsylvania Avenue, adjacent to the White House, and two blocks from the National Mall. Currently, there is a National World War I Memorial in Kansas City, Missouri, though none exists in Washington, D.C.

In May 2015, the Commission launched a design competition for the National World War I Memorial project in D.C. Joe Weishaar, architect-in-training from Chicago, Illinois, and sculptor Sabin Howard, won the competition with "The Weight of Sacrifice" design they submitted. The memorial will preserve the statue of General John J. Pershing that currently exists in Pershing Park. A ceremonial groundbreaking for the memorial was held in November 2017. Construction of the memorial is funded through private donation, with the American Legion and the Veterans of Foreign Wars each giving $300,000 at the groundbreaking event.

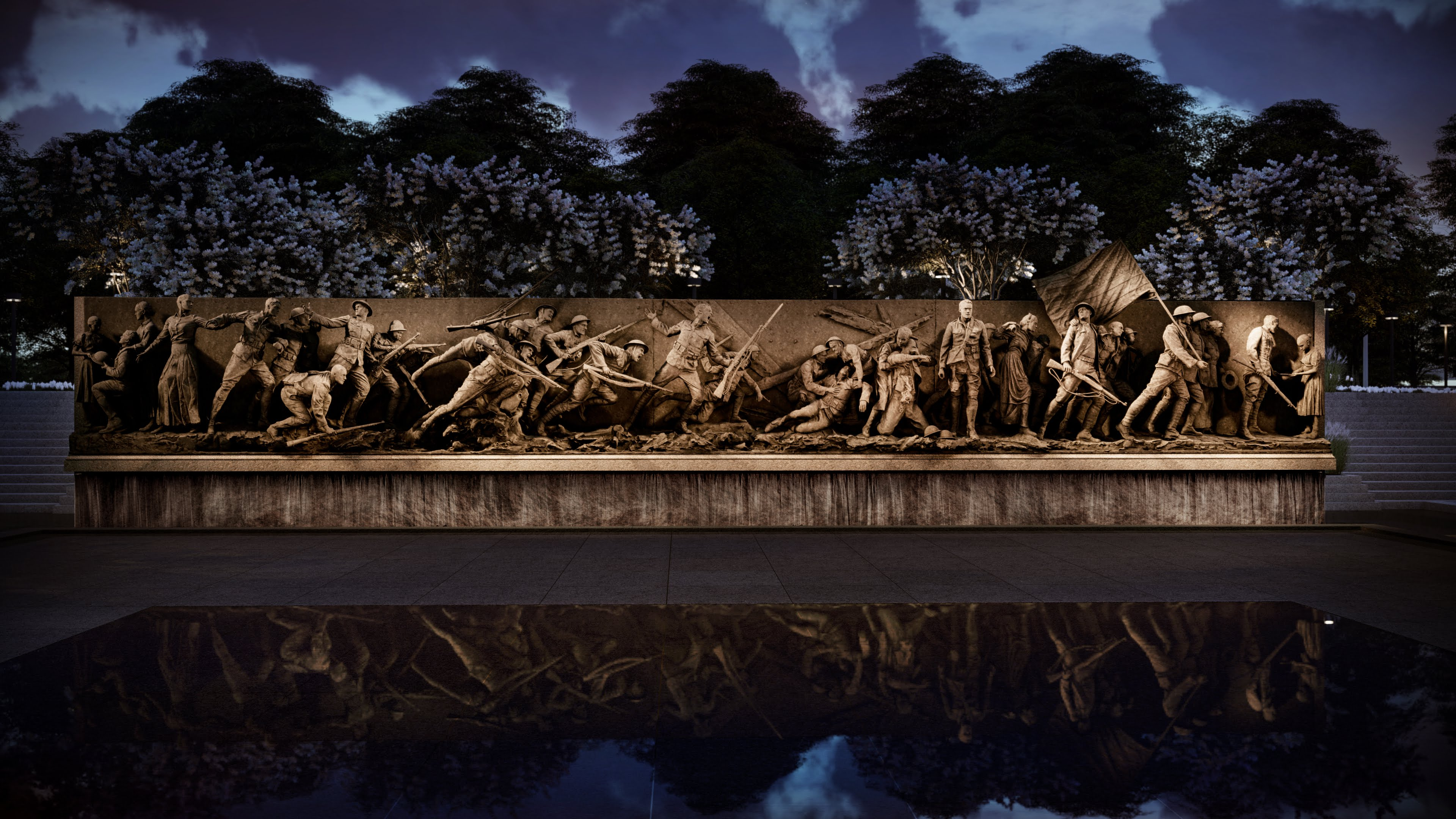
Rendering of the new National World War I Memorial in Washington DC. Photo courtesy of the U.S. World War I Centennial Commission.

== 100 Cities/100 Memorials ==
The "100 Cities/100 Memorials" is a fund-matching program implemented in July 2016, by the World War I Centennial Commission and the Pritzker Military Museum and Library, the program was created in response to world war memorials falling into disrepair and communities struggling to maintain them. The "100 Cities/100 Memorials" has been effective in helping communities across the United States restore and preserve local World War I memorials, and has been adopted by The American Legion by Resolution of the National Executive Committee. through:

=== Implementation ===
The "100 Cities/100 Memorials" works with communities across the US by:

A) Identify local World War I memorials in their area

B) Put together a conservation treatment proposal for a memorial in distress

C) Submit their plan for consideration for matching grant funds.

D) Have the memorial treated by an accredited conservator, with communication help & possible matching funds.

== The Commissioners ==
There are currently 11 Commissioners serving the U.S. World War I Centennial Commission, they come from diverse background, and serve without pay:

Name	Appointed By
Commander Zoe Dunning	House Minority Leader Nancy Pelosi
Edwin L. Fountain (Vice Chair)	Harry Reid
Jerry L. Hester	Mitch McConnell
Colonel Thomas Moe	John A. Boehner
Ambassador Tod Sedgwick	President Barack Obama
John D. Monahan	The American Legion
Dr. Libby O'Connell	President Barack Obama
Major General Alfred A. Valenzuela	President Barack Obama
Dr. Monique Brouillet Seefried	Veterans of Foreign Wars
Dr. Matthew Naylor	National World War I Museum and Memorial
Terry Hamby (Chair) Senate Majority Leader Mitch McConnell}
Debra Anderson	Veterans of Foreign Wars

== Honorary Chairs ==
Three living former Presidents have agreed to serve the commission as honorary chairmen:

- Jimmy Carter
- Bill Clinton
- George W. Bush
