= Lorenzo Ghiglieri =

American artist (1931–2020)

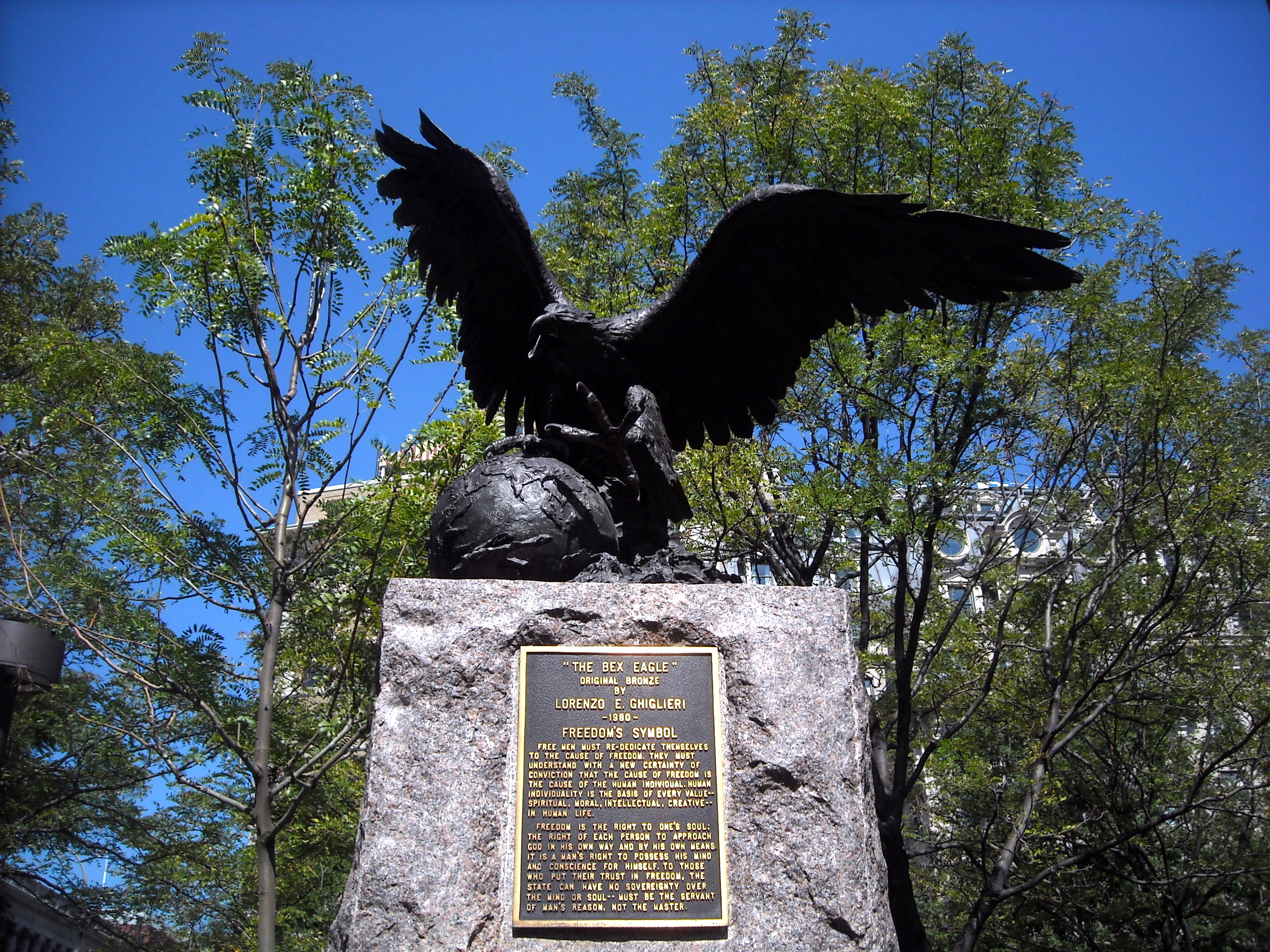
- Ghiglieri's The Bex Eagle at Pershing Park in Washington, D.C.
- Born: November 25, 1931; Los Angeles, California, U.S.
- Died: January 25, 2020 (aged 88); Vancouver, Washington, U.S.
- Known for: Painting, sculpture

Lorenzo Ghiglieri (November 25, 1931 – January 25, 2020) was an American painter and sculptor. The Portland, Oregon, newspaper Willamette Week referred to Ghiglieri as "one of the Northwest's best-recognized and most prolific bronze sculptors."

Ghiglieri's sculptures are displayed in a wide variety of locations around the world. His 27-foot (8.2 m)-high sculpture of an eagle is located at the entrance of the Seven Feathers Casino near Canyonville, Oregon. Ghiglieri also has works on permanent display at the White House, the Vatican, and Middlebury College. In 2009, he was awarded a commission by the Brown Bear Car Wash chain to design its parking lot art.
