= Traci L. Slatton =

American author and columnist

Traci L Slatton
- Born: July 23, 1963; Great Lakes, IL
- Occupations: Author, Novelist
- Notable work: IMMORTAL, THE BOTTICELLI AFFAIR, FALLEN
- Spouse: Sabin Howard
- Children: 3

Traci L. Slatton is an American author and novelist and columnist whose work includes both fiction and non-fiction books. She is also known for being the project manager for the WW1 War Memorial

== Early life and education ==
Slatton is a graduate of Yale and Columbia.

== Career ==
As of 2015, Slatton has written twelve books. Her first novel, Immortal, was published by Random House in 2008 . Later she wrote Fallen (2011), Cold Light (2012), Far Shore (2013), The Love of My (Other) Life (2013), Blood Sky (2015), The Love of My (Other) Life (2013) and The Botticelli Affair (2013).

Slatton's nonfiction works include Piercing Time & Space (2005) and The Art of Life (2012), which surveys figurative sculpture from the earliest times through the present, including the work of her husband, classical figurative sculptor Sabin Howard.

In 2016 Slatton's newest novel is Broken.

Slatton's books have been translated into several languages, including Italian, Spanish, French, Russian, Greek, Polish, and Portuguese.

Slatton is also the founder of the independent Parvati Press. Publishing authors include Dr. Jane Ely, Traci L. Slatton, and Sabin Howard. She contributes regularly to The Huffington Post.

She also host a BlogTalkRadio show called "Independent Artists & Thinkers"
