= A Soldier's Journey =

Sculpture in Washington, D.C., US

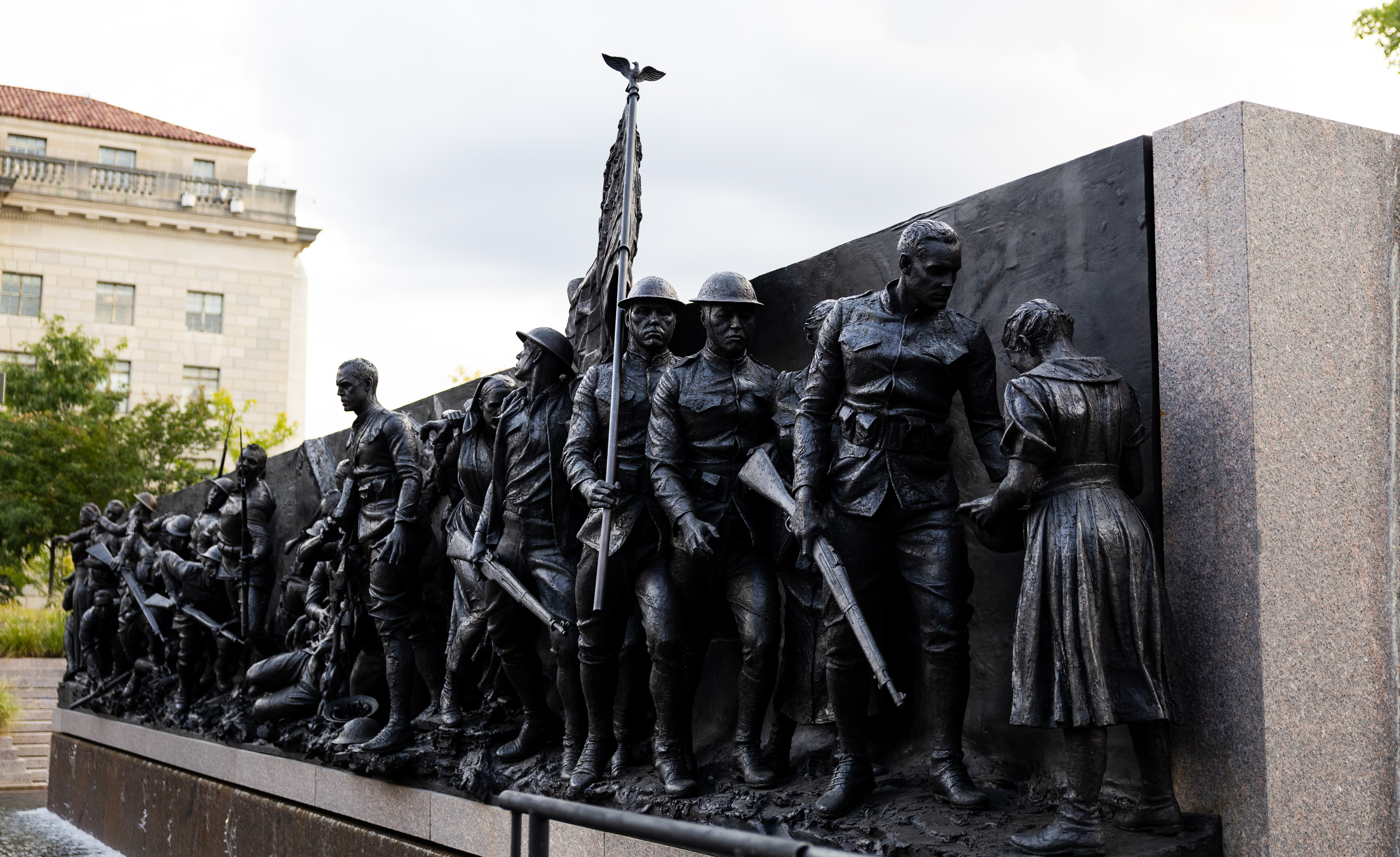
- Sculpture in 2024
- Artist: Sabin Howard
- Year: 2024
- Type: Bronze
- Dimensions: 3.0 m × 18 m (10 ft × 60 ft)
- Location: Washington, D.C., United States; 38°53′46″N 77°1′58″W

A Soldier's Journey is a bronze relief sculpture designed and created by American sculptor Sabin Howard to honor the legacy of Americans who served in World War I. The relief is located along the western end of the National World War I Memorial in Washington, D.C.

== History ==
The site was previously known as Pershing Park, in honor of World War I general John Pershing, but was rededicated as the National World War I Memorial on April 16, 2021 in a ceremony in which sitting U.S. President Joe Biden spoke. The memorial was created to honor those who served in the First World War as well as family members who tended to the homefront during the conflict.

In January 2016, a draft design by Joseph Weishaar, Sabin Howard, Phoebe Lickwar, and GWWO Architects originally entitled The Weight of Sacrifice was selected as the winning design that would be built, with some alterations. Following years of public feedback and Congressional meetings discussing the sculpture's final design, the artwork was revealed to the public on September 13, 2024 during a ceremony in which sculptor Sabin Howard, among others involved in the process of designing, funding, and creating the sculpture, spoke.

== Description ==
The relief tells a four-part story of an American soldier leaving home and fighting in the war. The first part, called the departure, shows a man kneeling by his daughter, who hands him his military helmet, while his wife places her hands on his shoulder, depicting the emotional toll family members endured when they had to separate from loved ones heading to the war. The next scene, entitled the ordeal, is a battle scene in which the soldier is joined by his countrymen in combat. The third scene, the aftermath, reveals both the physical and mental wounds incurred in battle, and shows a wounded soldier being tended to by his peers. The final scene, the return, shows the soldier returning home with his countrymen. The scene depicts soldiers marching triumphantly with the American flag. In the final part of the scene the soldier returns to see his family, and holds his helmet out to his daughter, mirroring the opening scene. His daughter looks inside his helmet, in an allegorical reference to the next great war: World War II.

== Gallery ==
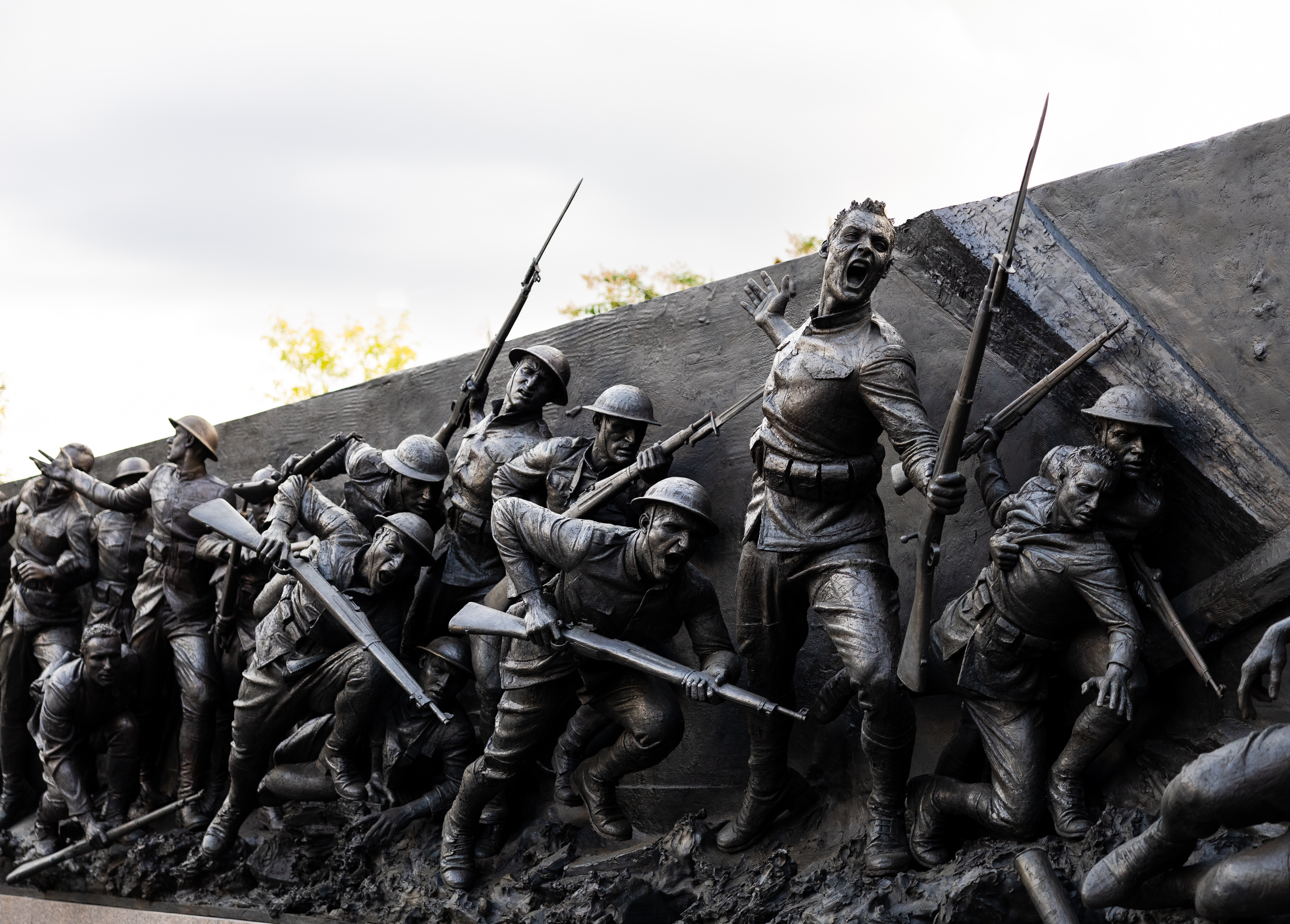
A close-up of the ordeal portion of the sculpture

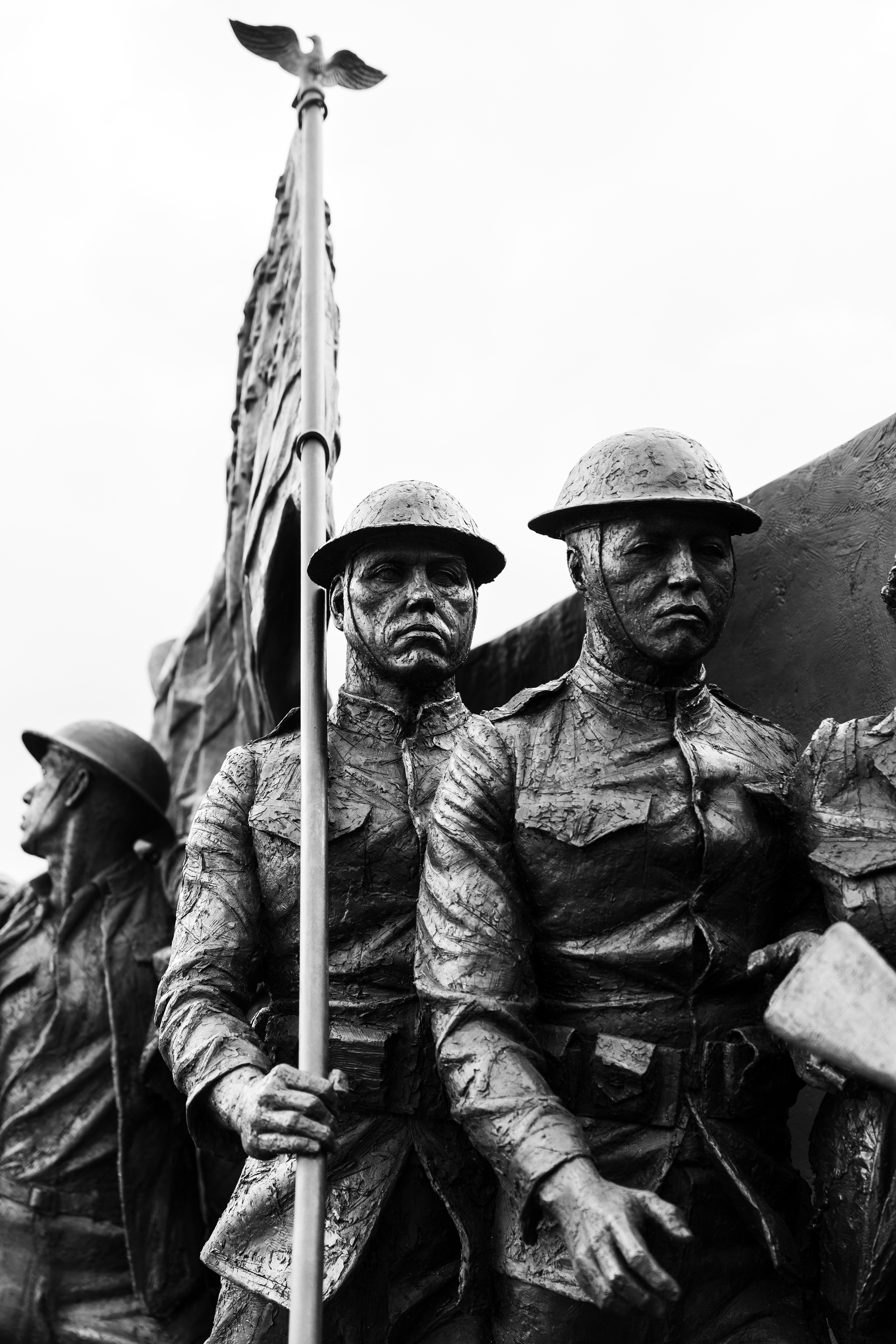
A close-up of soldiers marching with the American flag during the return phase of the sculpture

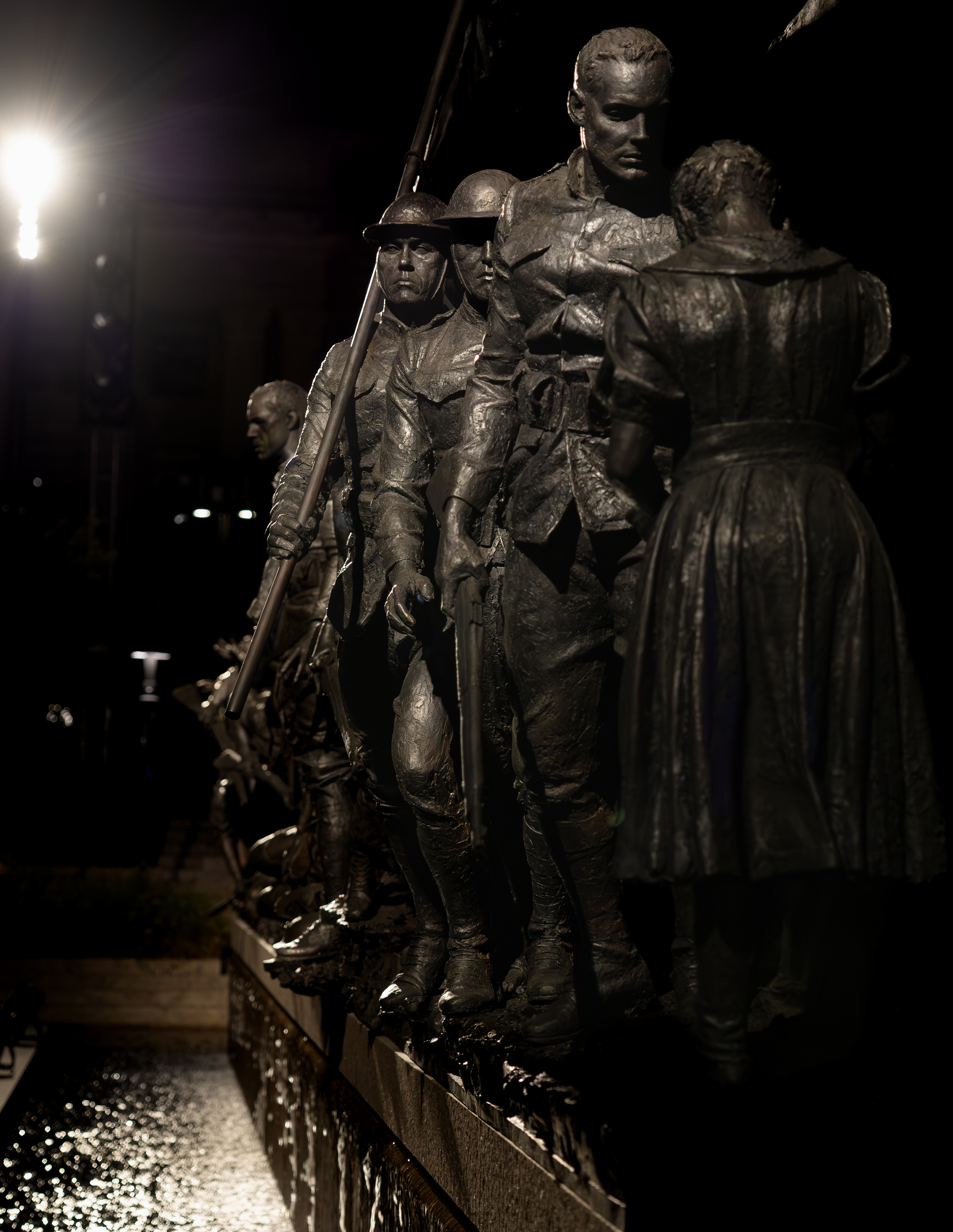
The sculpture at night

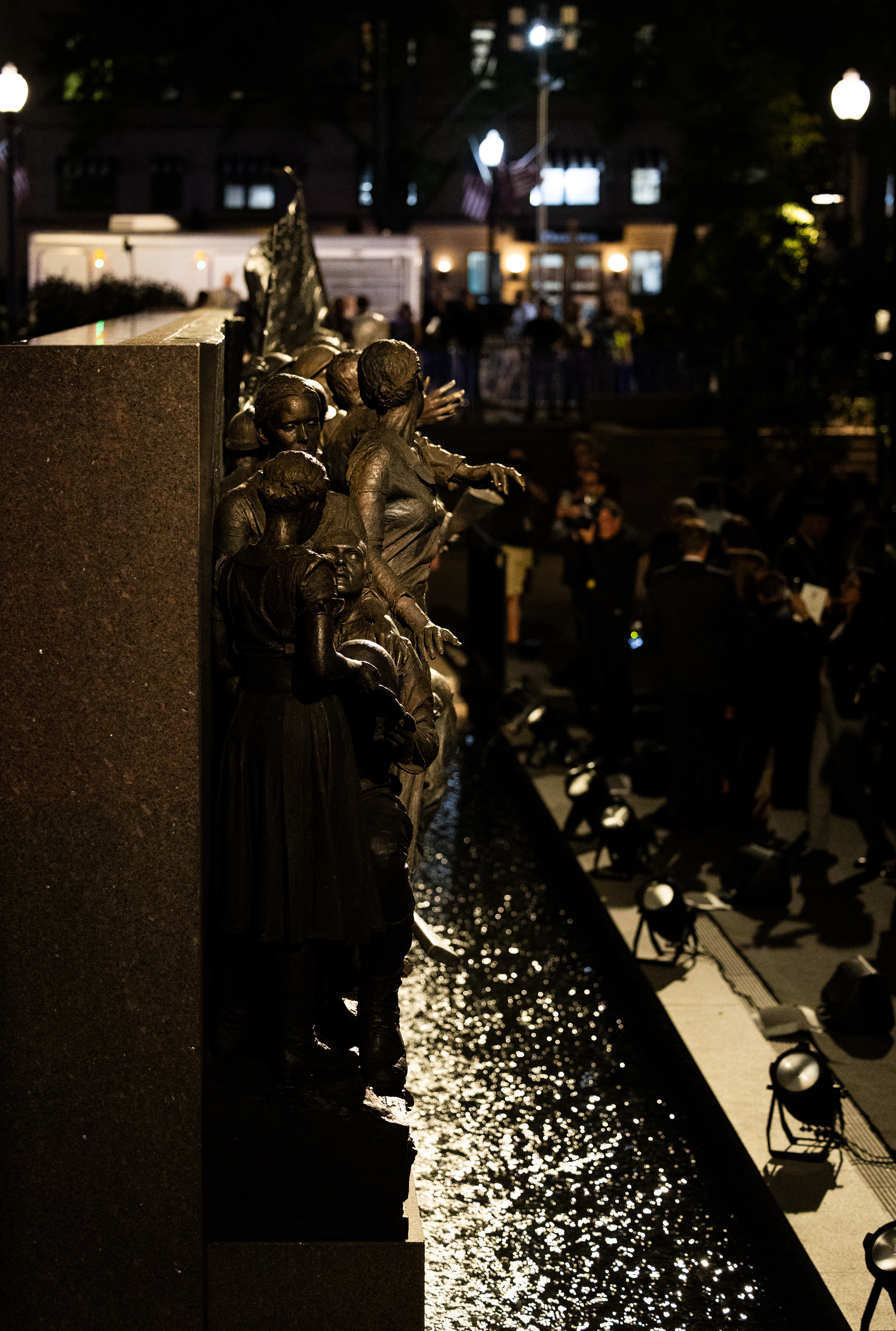
The sculpture illuminated for the first time on the night of September 13, 2024

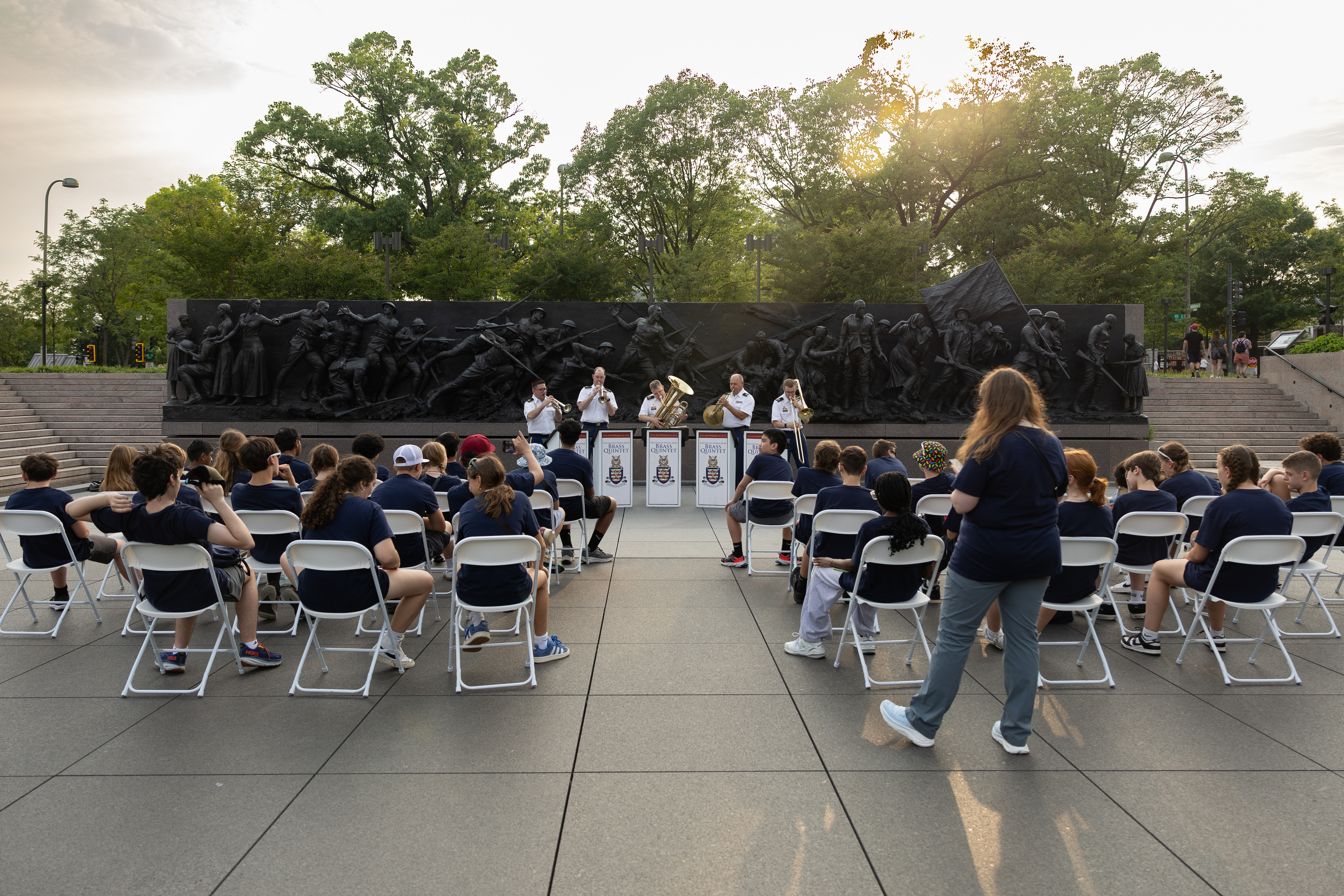
The Army Brass Quintet plays a concert in front of the sculpture on June 5, 2025
