= Johnsen Schmaling Architects =

Architecture firm in Milwaukee, Wisconsin, USA

Johnsen Schmaling Architects is an architecture firm located in Milwaukee, Wisconsin, United States, where it was founded in 2003 by Brian Johnsen and Sebastian Schmaling. The office is located in a former shoe factory in the Brady Street district of Milwaukee. The principals have described their design philosophy as "poetic realism". Johnsen and Schmaling are on the faculty of the School of Architecture & Urban Planning at the University of Wisconsin–Milwaukee.

== Notable projects ==
1. Topo House is a low-slung building partially carved into a sloping site, with a roof that peels itself up from the ground and terminates in a long cantilever. The project won a 2014 National AIA Housing Award, and Fast Company magazine called the project one of the "10 most fabulous housing designs of 2014."
2. OS House was recognized in 2011 as one of the top 10 residential projects in the United States by the American Institute of Architects. The LEED Platinum-certified home was also named in 2011 as one of the top 10 green projects in the country by the AIA, and in 2012 as one of 11 national winners in the Small Projects category. The OS House has been featured in the New York Times. The house, an example of 21st century modern architecture, is located on the shore of Lake Michigan in Racine's south side historic district.
3. Camouflage House is a rural house with a unique facade system, with a seemingly random sequence of vertical bands of black and white framing set against gray cedar siding, interspersed with floor-to-ceiling glass and colored panels. The L-shaped home is positioned between two rock outcroppings.
4. Plaza to a Forgotten War is the title of Johnsen Schmaling Architects' design proposal for the National World War I Memorial (Washington, D.C.), which was selected as one of five finalists in an international design competition drawing more than 350 entries from around the world. The Washington Post called Johnsen Schmaling's design the "strongest" among the selected finalists, and the Washington City Paper described it as "the only shortlisted design (that) had a strong and resonant concept."
5. Ferrous House is a sustainable re-design of a suburban ranch, sitting in a row of unexceptional 1970s ranches, part of a narrow subdivision hugging the edge of a wooded nature preserve west of Milwaukee.
6. Downtown Bar is a night club in Milwaukee, Wisconsin. The 21-foot-high space occupies the ground level of a mixed-use development in the city’s Historic Third Ward. The central feature is a 7-foot-wide light ribbon that spans the two levels of the space.
7. Layton Pavilion is a connection from a large strip mall parking lot to a brownfield site.
8. Urban Infill 01 and 02: affordable prototypical houses for small urban lots.
9. Stacked Cabin is a small forest retreat based on the vertical stacking of components of traditional cabin compounds. The middle of the home is a living hub. In the sleeping and den areas, slender windows frame views of the surroundings. The third floor serves as an observatory, offering views of the surrounding forest and hills.
10. Studio for a Composer is a soundproof work space for a Country Western musician, with a small rehearsal room and underground storage space.

== Recognition ==
Johnsen Schmaling Architects was named an Emerging Voice in 2008 by the Architectural League of New York, and Architectural Record featured the office in its 2011 "Design Vanguard" issue as one of the world's most innovative architecture studios. Residential Architect magazine, a publication of the American Institute of Architects, named Johnsen Schmaling Architects the 2012 "Top Firm." In 2015, Architectural Digest named Johnsen Schmaling Architects one of ten "Rising Stars" in American architecture.

=== Awards ===
Johnsen Schmaling has received more than 80 professional design awards, among them five National AIA Housing Design Awards, twelve National AIA Small Project Honor Awards, and eighteen regional AIA Honor and Merit Awards.
