= Elephant Car Wash =

Car wash chain in Seattle, Washington

- Logo

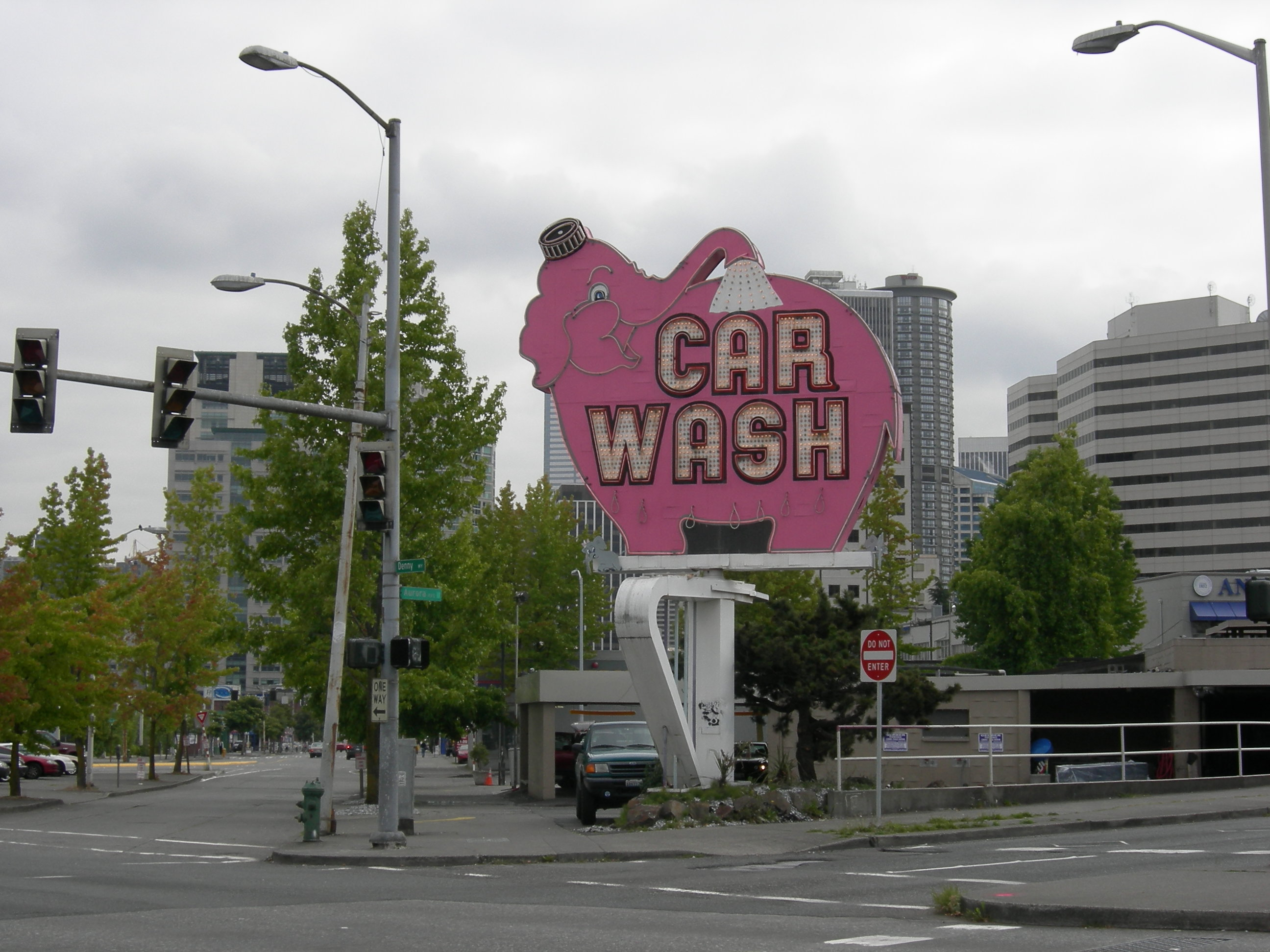
- Elephant Car Wash in South Lake Union, 2007
- Website: elephantcarwash.com

Elephant Car Wash is a chain of car washes in Seattle, in the U.S. state of Washington.

== History ==
The first Elephant Car Wash was opened by Eldon Anderson of Richmond Beach, along with his two younger brothers Archie and Dean, at the intersection of Fourth and Lander in 1951. Anderson had opened Five Minute Car Wash, one of the first semi-automated car washes in the United States, with business partners during the 1940s. He later invented the "first truly hands-free car washing system". The second Elephant Car Wash opened along downtown Seattle's Battery Street in 1956. There were 14 locations, as of 2016.

The Battery Street location is slated for closure and demolition, as of late 2020.

== Signs ==
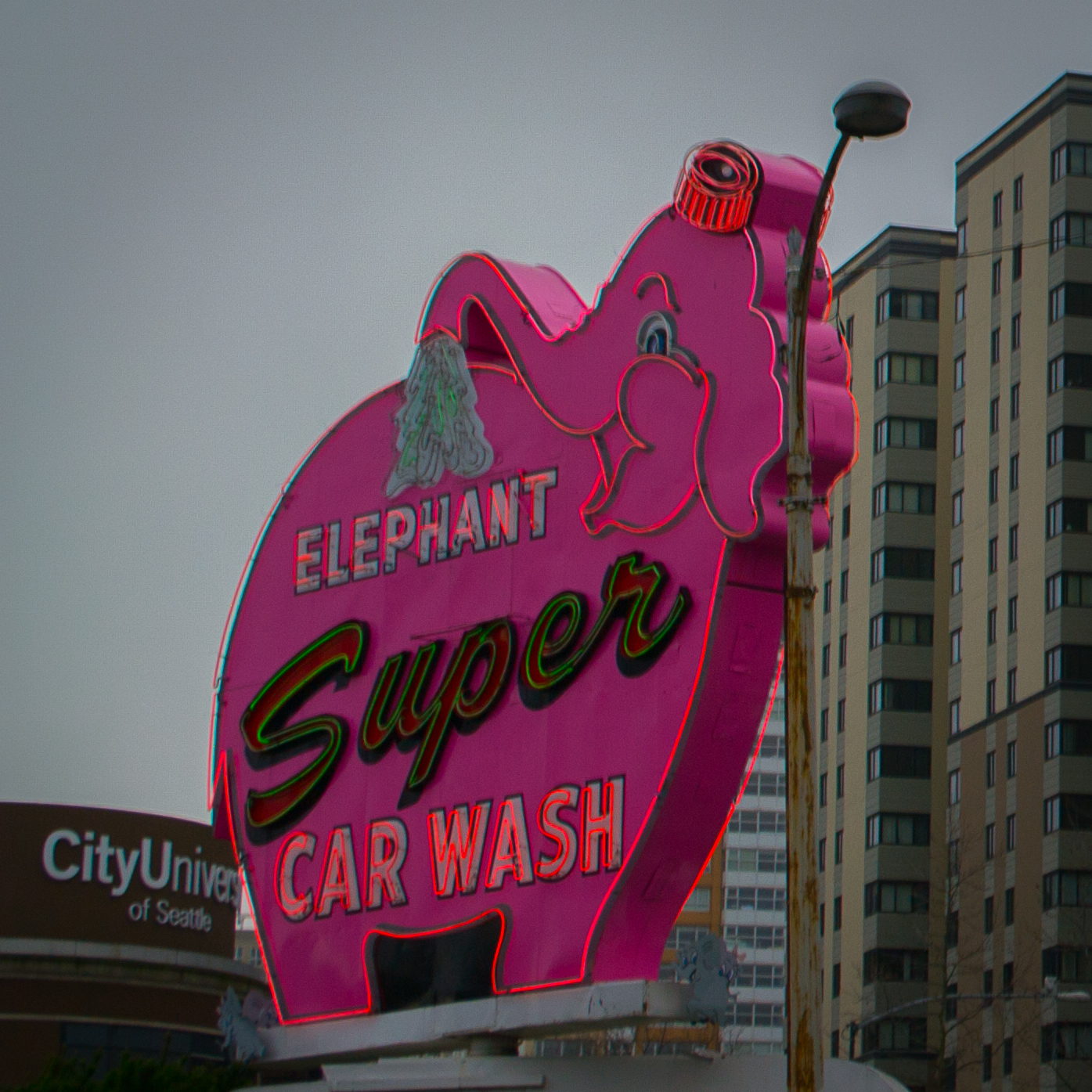
Sign in 2013

The Battery Street location's two pink elephant signs have become local landmarks. The larger one has been described as a "rotating, pink neon sign—which has appeared in movies, music videos and ads, and has attracted patrons ranging from the Secret Service to Elvis Presley", as well as "one of the most photographed landmarks in Seattle". The larger sign is slated for relocation to the Museum of History & Industry, which has been protested by a preservation group.

In November 2020, business owner Bob Haney donated the smaller sign to Amazon. The smaller sign is installed at a public plaza on the Amazon headquarters campus, two blocks from the original car wash.

== See also ==
- Brown Bear Car Wash
