= National World War I Memorial (Washington, D.C.) =

U.S. national memorial in Washington, D.C.

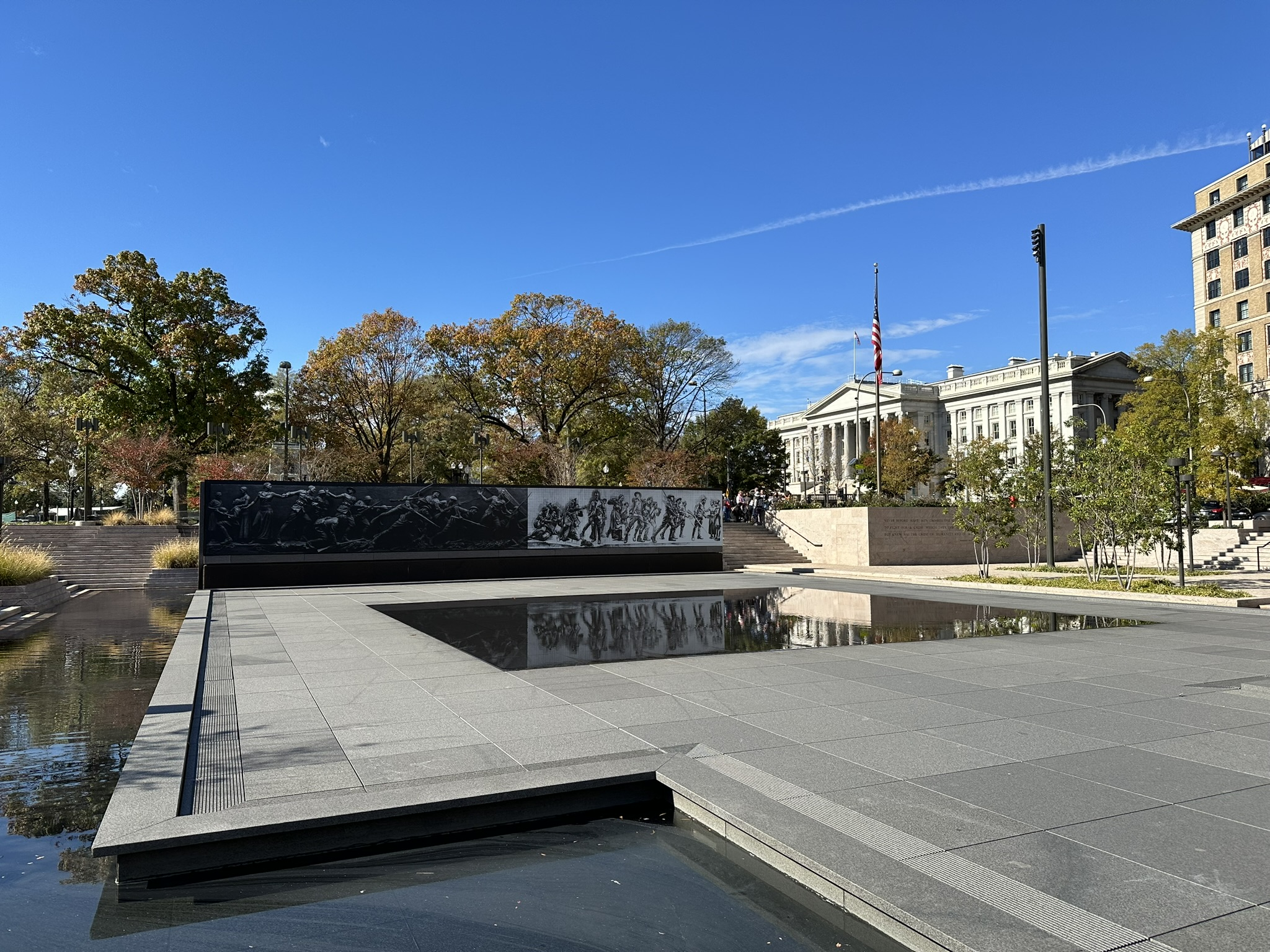
- National World War I Memorial in 2023

- Location within Central Washington, D.C. Location within the United States
- Location: Washington, D.C., U.S.
- Coordinates: 38°53′46″N 77°1′58″W
- Area: 1.76 acres (7,100 m^{2})
- Established: May 14, 1981 (Pershing Park); April 16, 2021 (National World War I Memorial)
- Governing body: National Park Service and National World War I Memorial Commission
- Website: National World War I Memorial

The National World War I Memorial is a national memorial dedicated to Americans who served the United States Armed Forces in World War I. The 2015 National Defense Authorization Act authorized the World War I Centennial Commission to build the memorial in Pershing Park, located at 14th Street and Pennsylvania Avenue NW in Washington, D.C. The park, which has existed since 1981, also contains the John J. Pershing General of the Armies commemorative work. In January 2016, the design commission selected the submission "The Weight of Sacrifice", by a team consisting of Joseph Weishaar, Sabin Howard, Phoebe Lickwar, and GWWO Architects, as the winning design, Entitled A Soldier's Journey, the relief sculpture was dedicated on September 14, 2024. Standing on the western end of the memorial, it depicts the journey of a soldier leaving home and fighting in the war before returning to his family. The memorial was listed on the National Register of Historic Places in 2025.

In 2016, David Rubin Land Collective replaced Forge as landscape architects for the project. Growing pressure to preserve M. Paul Friedberg’s design for Pershing Park while acknowledging the extent of the park as the national memorial required a balanced approach inserting new elements of commemoration and managed change of the original modernist construct. Although the project had met “concept approval” previously, in an effort to describe a thoughtful memorial while revivifying the urban park, a new concept was developed for approval by the agencies with oversight. Where the winning proposal erased a significant portion of the park, the new proposal led by DAVID RUBIN Land Collective struck a balance to ensure both modernist park and memorial could be read simultaneously. Over the course of 39 months, the design team presented alternates negotiating memorial and park elements, resulting in a holistic urban park memorial that met the needs of all parties, including the World War I Commission.

On September 19, 2020, Libby O’Connell, representing the World War I Commission, and David A. Rubin, founding principal of David Rubin Land Collective, presented the revised design to the US Commission of Fine Arts for final approval, and the new concept was able to move forward through construction.

On April 16, 2021, the U.S. flag was raised at the memorial and President Joe Biden spoke at a virtual ceremony opening it to the public. Since its opening day, a bugler has played "Taps" every single day at 5 p.m., regardless of weather or any other inconvenience.

== Pershing Park ==
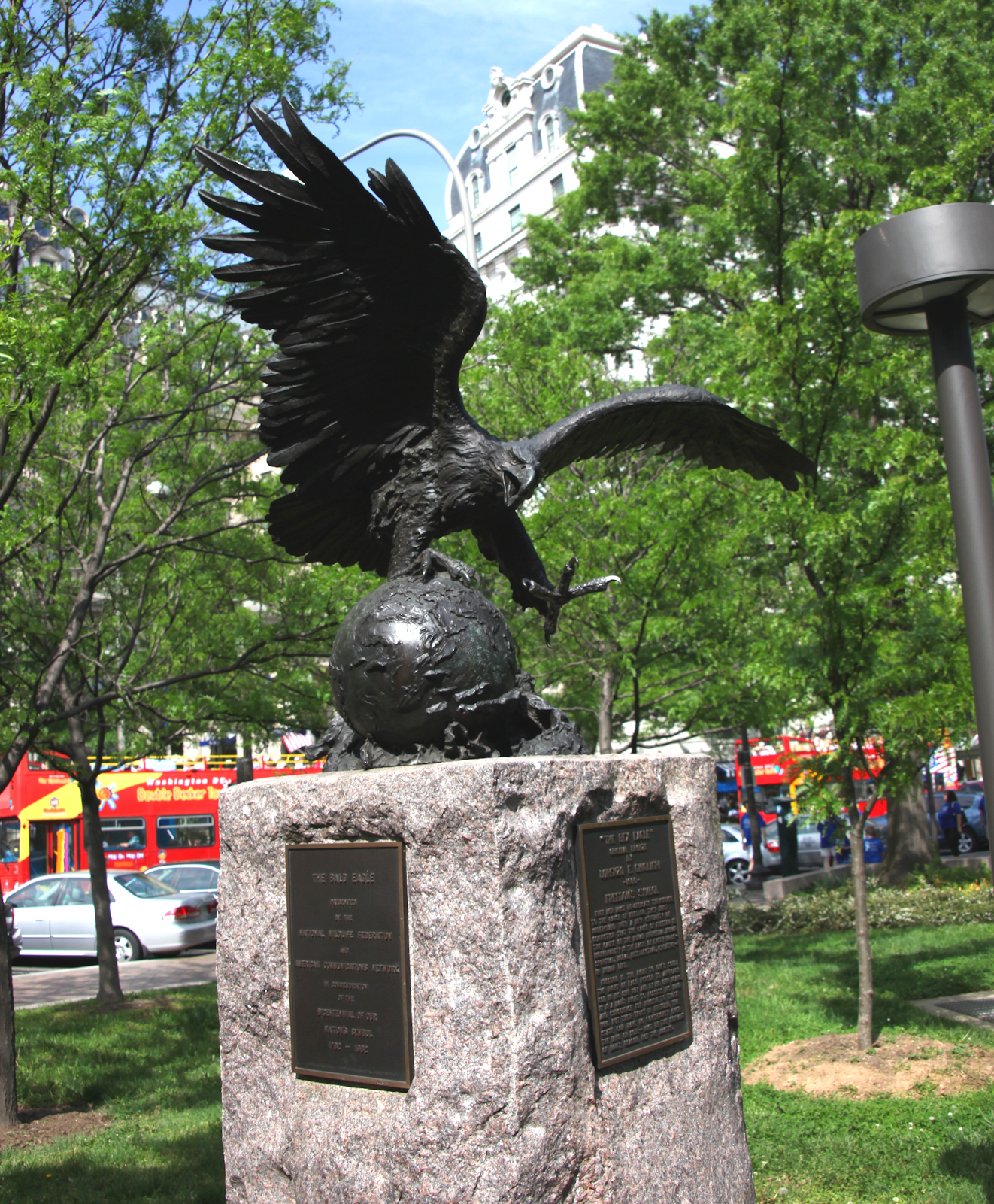
The Bex Eagle, a statue of an eagle carrying the world, is located on the west end of the memorial

The Pershing Park site was originally occupied by a variety of 19th-century structures until about 1930, when the federal government took legal title to the block and demolished the structures on it. Legislation officially designating the plot as Pershing Square subsequently was adopted by Congress in 1957. Different groups offered competing proposals for memorials to John J. Pershing, a prominent military figure. These disagreements led to inaction, and by 1962 the square remained bare and often cluttered with trash. In September 1963, District of Columbia officials finally planted grass and flower beds to temporarily beautify the square.

In November 1963, the President's Council on Pennsylvania Avenue proposed a master plan for the redevelopment of Pennsylvania Avenue NW from the White House to the United States Capitol. The master plan proposed constructing a National Plaza (also called the Western Plaza), which would have required the demolition of Pershing Square, the Willard Hotel north of the square, and the two blocks of buildings and streets east of these tracts. The American Legion, among others, kept pushing for a grand statue of Pershing for the square, but all plans for the park were suspended until the Pennsylvania Avenue master plan could be finalized.

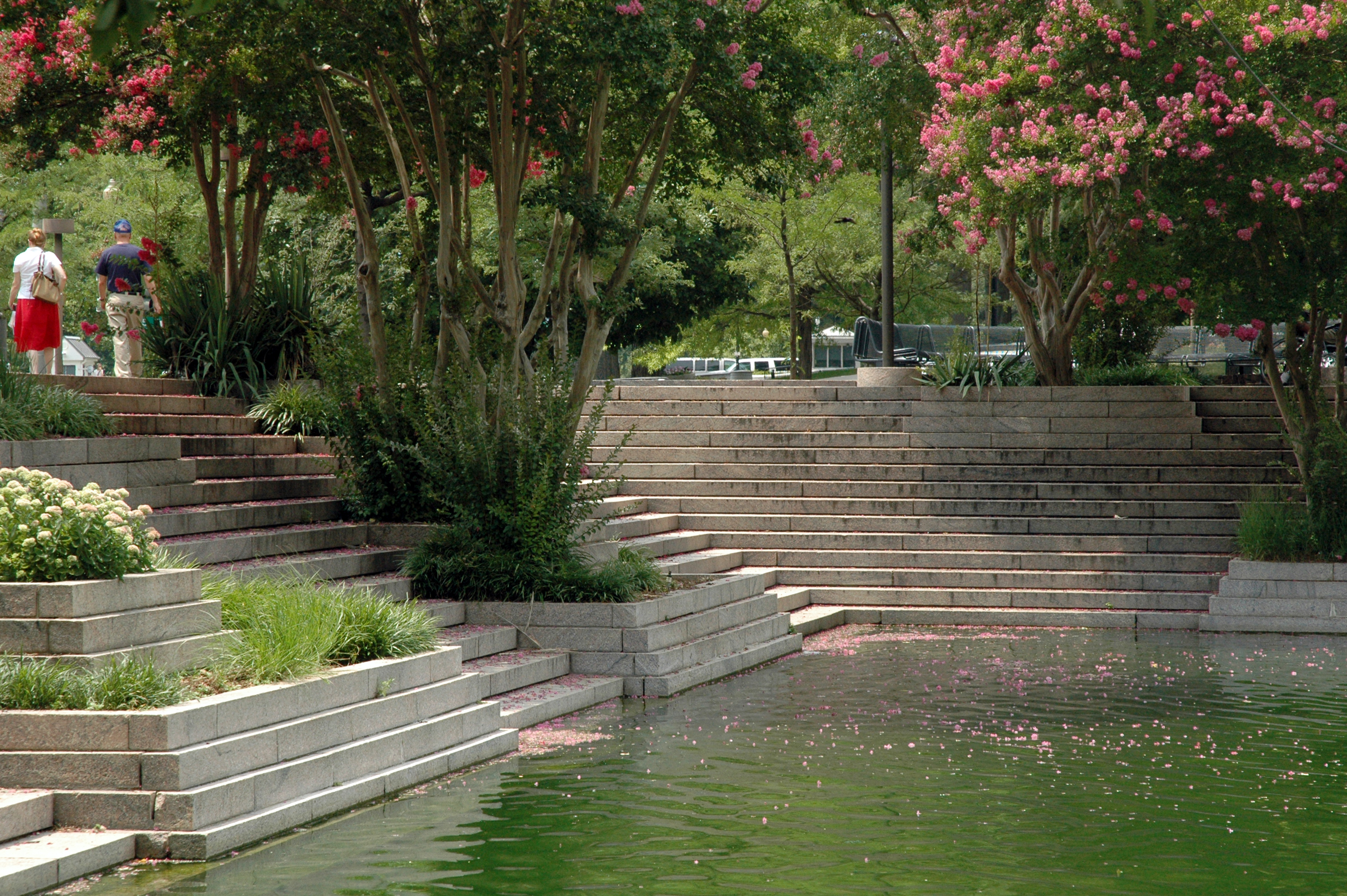
Pershing Park in 2007

National Plaza was never constructed. Instead, a much smaller Freedom Plaza was built that did not require the demolition of Pershing Square. Designs for a statue and memorial to Pershing and for the larger park were finalized in the 1970s, and Pershing Park was constructed simultaneously with Freedom Plaza from 1979 to 1981. The park was slightly enlarged due to the realignment of Pennsylvania Avenue NW along the area's north side. Pershing Park formally opened to the public at 11:45 AM on May 14, 1981. The American Battle Monuments Commission paid the $400,000 for the park.

Pershing Park contains a statue of General Pershing by Robert White, as well as memorial walls and benches behind the statue describing Pershing's achievements in World War I. The sculpture was dedicated in October 1983.

The park also has a fountain, a pond (which turned into an ice rink in the winter), and flower beds. Pershing Park is owned by the government of the District of Columbia, but administered by the National Park Service as an official unit of the park system (managed under the agency's National Mall and Memorial Parks administrative group).

More than 400 demonstrators were illegally arrested in Pershing Park in September 2002 during anti-globalization protests against the World Bank and International Monetary Fund.

== Planning and design ==
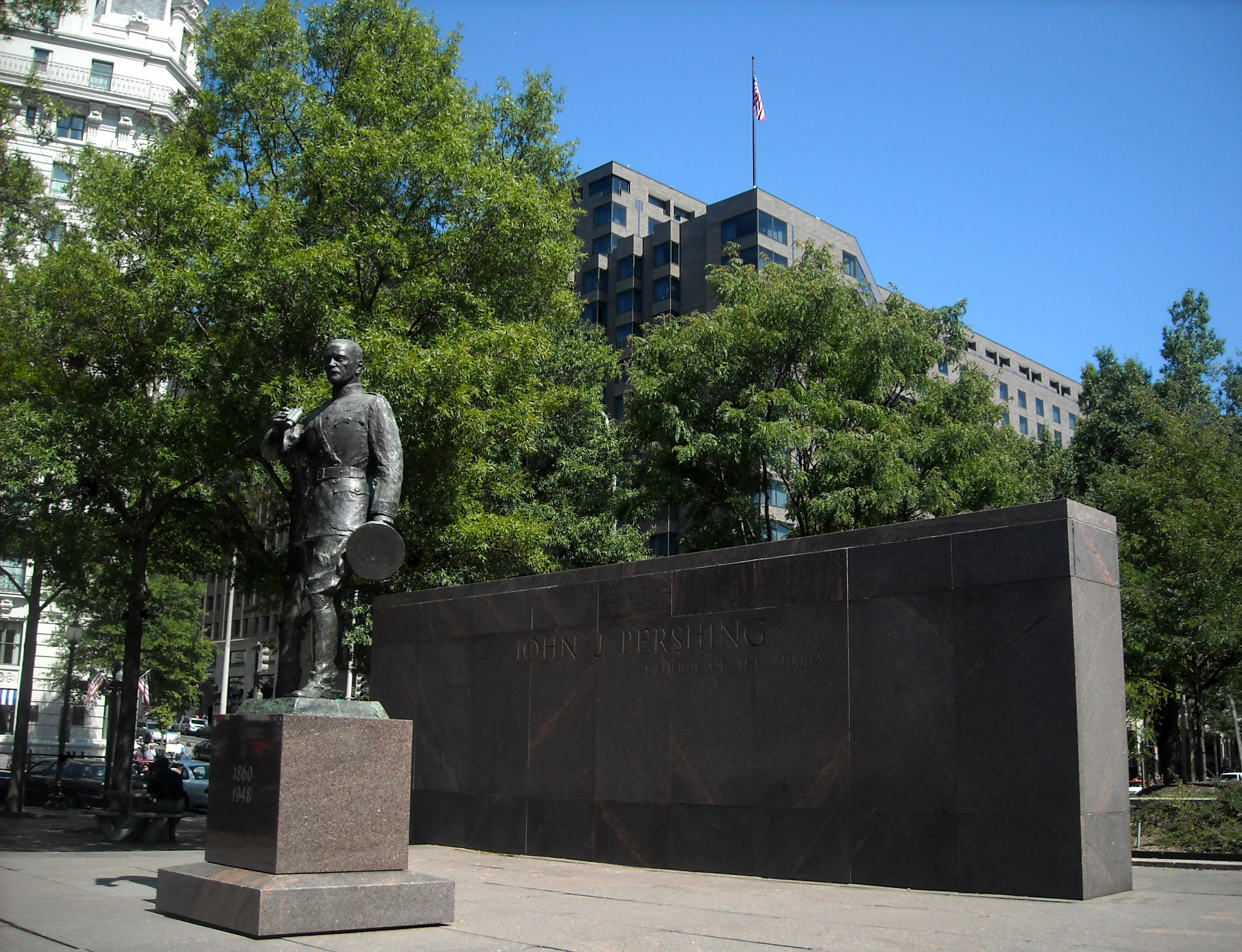
John J. Pershing Memorial in Pershing Park

In 1931, the people of the District of Columbia erected the District of Columbia War Memorial on the National Mall to honor individuals from the District who had served in the U.S. armed forces in World War I. But the largest of the country's World War I memorials was the Liberty Memorial, a 217-foot (66 m) tall tower with an artificial burning pyre atop it, located in Kansas City, Missouri. A Memorial Court surrounded the tower, with a Memory Hall (dedicated to the memory of Kansas Citians who died in the war) on the east and a Museum Building on the west. Ground was broken on the memorial on November 1, 1921, and it opened on November 11, 1926. But no national memorial commemorating World War I was erected over the next 70 years, which upset World War I veterans.

The Liberty Memorial suffered from neglect over the years, and the tower was closed to the public in 1994. A $102 million renovation and expansion effort began in 2000, and the memorial reopened in 2006. The expansion, which added a 30,000-square-foot (2,800 m^{2}) museum space, a 20,000-square-foot (1,900 m^{2}) research center, a theater, a cafeteria, and modern storage for the museum's extensive collection, opened in 2006.

=== The National World War I Museum ===
With the 2000 Liberty Memorial renovation under way, Senator Kit Bond (R-Missouri) introduced a resolution (S.Con.Res. 114) giving official federal recognition to the Liberty Memorial as "America's National World War I Museum". The designation was only honorific, but it did not pass.

In 2004, with the National World War II Memorial about to open in Washington, D.C., Representative Karen McCarthy (D-Missouri) introduced legislation (H.Con.Res. 421) to designate the Liberty Memorial as "America's National World War I Museum". In the Senate, Senator Jim Talent (R-Missouri) sought agreement to amend S. 2400, the Defense Authorization Act for Fiscal Year 2005, with identical language. Talent's amendment was unanimously adopted on June 15, 2004, and the bill passed both houses of Congress. President George W. Bush signed the legislation into law on October 28, 2004 (Pub. L. 108–375 (text) (PDF)).

=== Early legislative efforts to create a National World War I Memorial ===
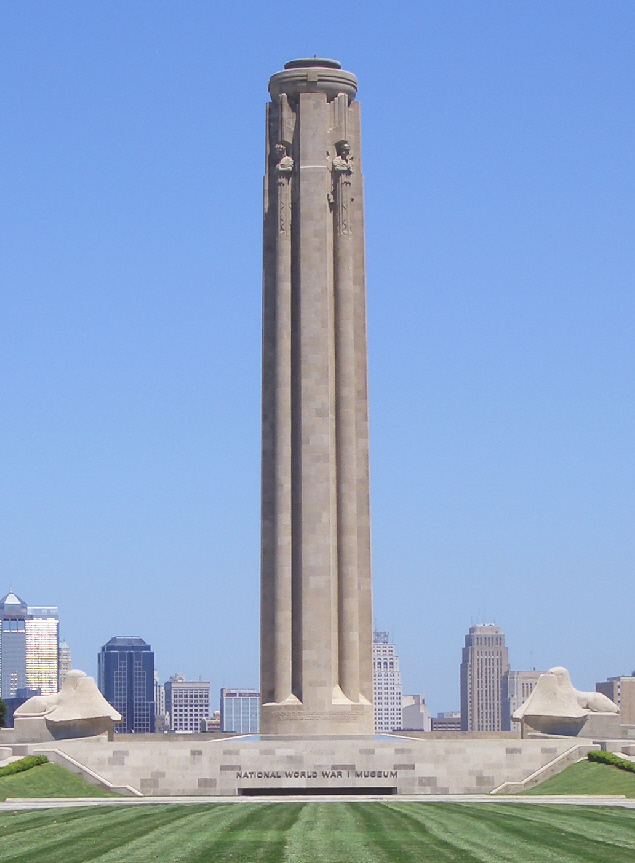
The Liberty Memorial in Kansas City, Missouri

The push for a national World War I memorial arose from the successful effort to establish the National World War II Memorial. Legislation to establish the National World War II Memorial was introduced in 1987, and after several unsuccessful efforts passed Congress on May 12, 1993. It was dedicated on May 28, 2004. In fall 2000, Jan Scruggs, CEO of the Vietnam Veterans Memorial Fund, proposed rededicating the District of Columbia War Memorial in honor of all World War I veterans. Scruggs claimed that a member of Congress was working on legislation to effect the change, but no bill was introduced in the 106th Congress or the three successive Congresses.

In 2008, the American Legion called for conversion of the District of Columbia War Memorial as well. To give added impetus to the effort, local attorney Edwin Fountain formed the World War I Memorial Foundation to solicit funds and lobby for the effort. (Note: Fountain had independently conceived the idea for the foundation after jogging past the District of Columbia War Memorial one day and formed his foundation in late 2008 or early 2009. Fountain left the foundation in late 2012. David DeJonge, a photographer and friend of Buckles and a co-founder of the foundation, took over as president.) D.C. Council member Jack Evans (in whose ward the D.C. War Memorial was located) and Eleanor Holmes Norton, D.C.'s Delegate to Congress, became honorary trustees of the foundation.

In 2007, Representative Ted Poe (R-Texas) met Frank Buckles, the last surviving American veteran of World War I. Buckles expressed his dismay that there was no national World War I memorial, and Poe began to champion his cause. Poe introduced legislation the next year, titled the Frank Buckles World War I Memorial Act (H.R. 6696), that authorized the American Battle Monuments Commission to either take over the District of Columbia War Memorial or to build a new one on the same site. The bill also established a World War I Memorial Advisory Board to assist in raising funds to build the memorial. (Note: Private funds to build the memorial were required under the Commemorative Works Act of 1986, as amended, which barred federal funding of new memorials, largely barred new memorials around the National Mall, established a process for design review, and required that at least 70 percent of the estimated construction cost of the memorial be raised before construction could begin. Memorial buildings were also required to raise an amount, equal to 10 percent of the total construction cost, for placement in a maintenance trust fund to be administered by the National Park Service.) Referred to committee, the bill died there after senators Kit Bond and Claire McCaskill (D-Missouri) grew concerned that the "new" memorial would compete with the Liberty Memorial in their state. McCaskill and Rep. Emanuel Cleaver introduced legislation (H.R. 7243 and S. 3589) to designate the Liberty Memorial as the National World War I Memorial. Separately, Bond and Cleaver introduced legislation (H.R. 6960 and S. 3537) to establish a World War I Centennial Commission to develop and implement programs to commemorate the centennial of World War I. These bills all died in committee, as did McCaskill's (S. 760) and Bond's (S. 761) reintroductions in 2009. Cleaver combined the two bills as H.R. 1849, which passed the House but was never taken up by the Senate.

Separately, Senator John Thune (R-South Dakota) introduced legislation (S. 2097) to allow Fountain's World War I Memorial Foundation to take over the D.C. War Memorial and re-establish it as the National World War I Memorial. (Note: Like Poe, Thune met Buckles and was impressed with him. By this time, Buckles had endorsed the World War I Memorial Foundation project, and Thune's legislation differed from Poe's in using that foundation as the primary memorial agent.) Efforts to rename the D.C. War Memorial gained support when the D.C. Council voted in 2009 to support the Thune bill. Hearings were held on Thune's bill, at which Frank Buckles (now 108 years old) testified. Representatives from the National Park Service also testified in favor of the bill, noting that there was no longer any room on the National Mall for a major memorial. But it, too, died in committee, as did Poe's companion legislation in the House (H.R. 482).

=== Creating the World War I Centennial Commission ===
Legislation finally passed in the 112th Congress, compromising by designating both sites as national memorials, as suggested in 2008 by attorney Edwin Fountain. Senator Thune offered his support for this in December 2009.

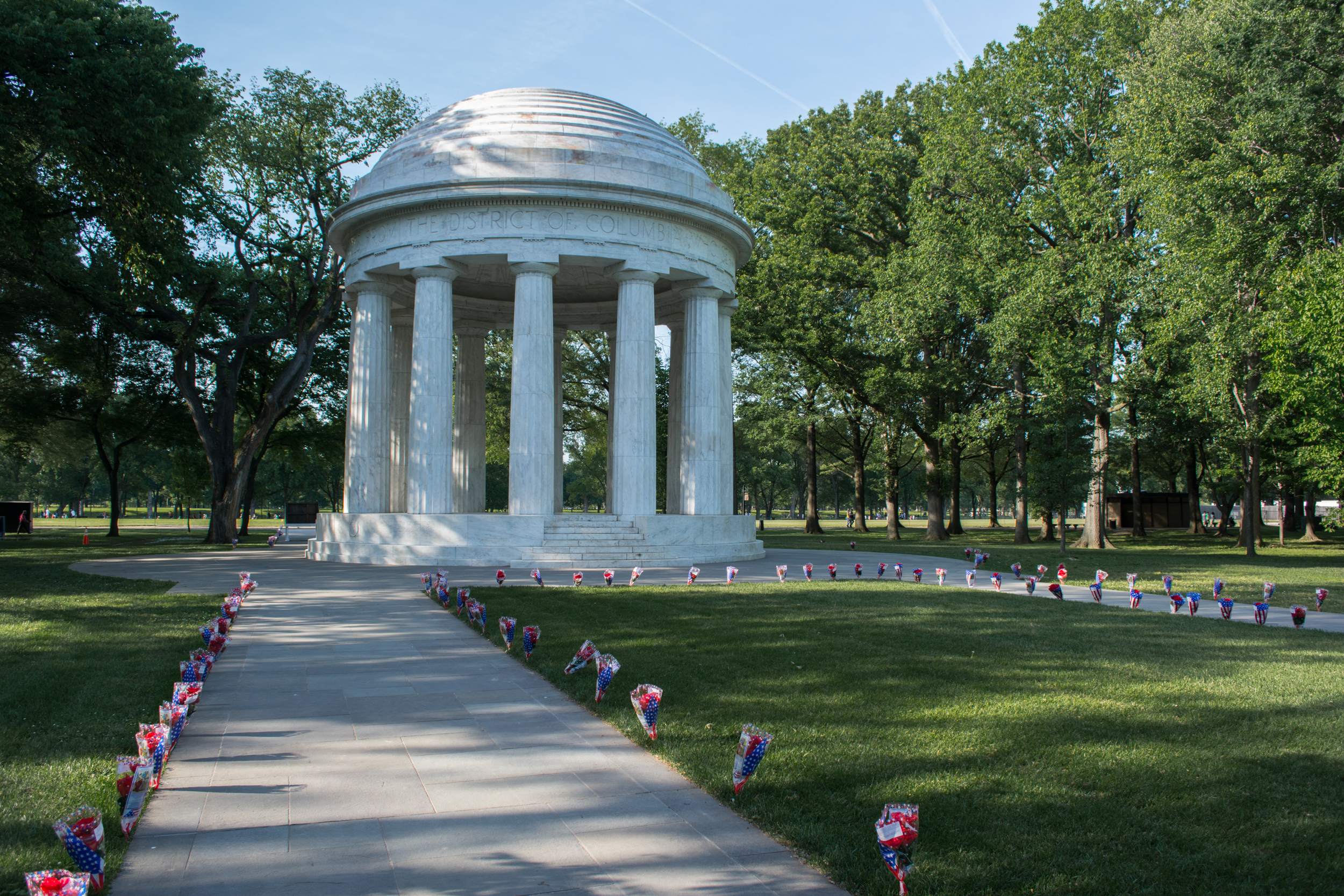
The District of Columbia War Memorial

Much activity preceded passage of the final bill. On February 1, 2011, Senator John D. Rockefeller IV (D-West Virginia) introduced compromise legislation (S. 253) which (a) established a World War I Centennial Commission and (b) designated both the Liberty Memorial in Kansas City and the District of Columbia War Memorial in Washington, D.C., as National World War I Memorials. Rockefeller's bill authorized the World War I Memorial Foundation to raise funds and oversee the transformation of the D.C. memorial. But citizens of the District of Columbia were increasingly opposed to losing their hometown memorial. The Rhodes Tavern-D.C. Heritage Society, a prominent local historic preservation organization, advocated turning Pershing Square into the memorial, as a commemorative statue to General Pershing already occupied the site. The World War I Memorial Foundation opposed the Pershing Square site as too isolated by busy D.C. streets and argued that being off the National Mall diminished the importance of the war. The foundation also opposed any new designation for the Liberty Memorial for the same reason.

On February 27, 2011, Frank Buckles died of natural causes, generating an outpouring of emotion, including an effort to have him lie in state in the United States Capitol rotunda. On March 8, Rep. Poe introduced the Frank Buckles World War I Memorial Act (H.R. 938) again, but this time it matched Rockefeller's bill that designated both memorials and created a centennial commission. (Note: As with previous bills, the designation of the Liberty Memorial as the "National World War I Memorial" did not transfer ownership of the memorial to the federal government from the city of Kansas City, and provided no federal funding for the Liberty Memorial. The designation was, therefore, symbolic.) This represented an agreement by the Missouri delegation, Thune, and Poe. As with his 2009 bill, Poe's new effort authorized the World War I Memorial Foundation to raise funds, design the memorial, and oversee its erection. Poe's bill was referred to the House Committee on Oversight and Government Reform and the House Committee on Natural Resources. On January 24, 2011, the Natural Resources Subcommittee on National Parks, Forests and Federal Lands held hearings on the bill.

Opposition to the takeover of the D.C. War Memorial was growing. On July 8, 2011, Del. Norton introduced H.Res. 346, a non-binding resolution which expressed the sense of the House of Representatives that the District of Columbia War Memorial should remain dedicated solely to the residents of the District of Columbia. Norton's change in position came about after she came to perceive the redesignation of the memorial as a diminishment of the District of Columbia, similar to the lack of voting rights for District residents. D.C. Mayor Vincent C. Gray and the Association of the Oldest Inhabitants of the District of Columbia also opposed the redesignation effort.

With time running out in the 112th Congress, and less than two years before the start of the World War I centennial, on September 10, 2012, Rep. Poe introduced the World War I Centennial Commission Act (H.R. 6364), which established the World War I Centennial Commission to oversee World War I centennial commemorations, programs, and observances. The bill also designated the Liberty Memorial as the "National World War I Museum and Memorial", a symbolic designation to improve its national prominence prior to the war centennial. In June 2012, Poe agreed to abandon his effort to redesignate the District of Columbia War memorial, and Del. Norton agreed to support construction of a national World War I memorial on the National Mall. Instead, his bill authorized the World War I Memorial Foundation to create a new commemorative work on 1.5 acres (6,100 m^{2}) at Constitution Gardens, on the north side of the National Mall between the Vietnam Veterans Memorial and the Washington Monument. During markup of the bill by the Committee on Natural Resources on December 5, 2012, the bill was amended to reduce the acreage allotted to 0.5 acres (2,000 m^{2}) and for the memorial to be erected on any federal land within the District of Columbia (including the National Mall). The bill was unanimously approved by the committee, It passed the House on a voice vote on December 12. Senator McCaskill offered an amendment in the nature of a substitute which removed the designation of the Liberty Memorial as the National World War I Museum and Memorial, and removed the authority to build a memorial in Washington, D.C. The Senate approved the amended bill on December 21. A conference committee agreed to the Senate's changes. On December 31, the House approved the Senate-amended bill. President Barack Obama signed the legislation into law (Pub. L. 112–272 (text) (PDF)P.L. 112-272) on January 14, 2013, only establishing the United States World War I Centennial Commission.

=== Creating two National World War I Memorials ===
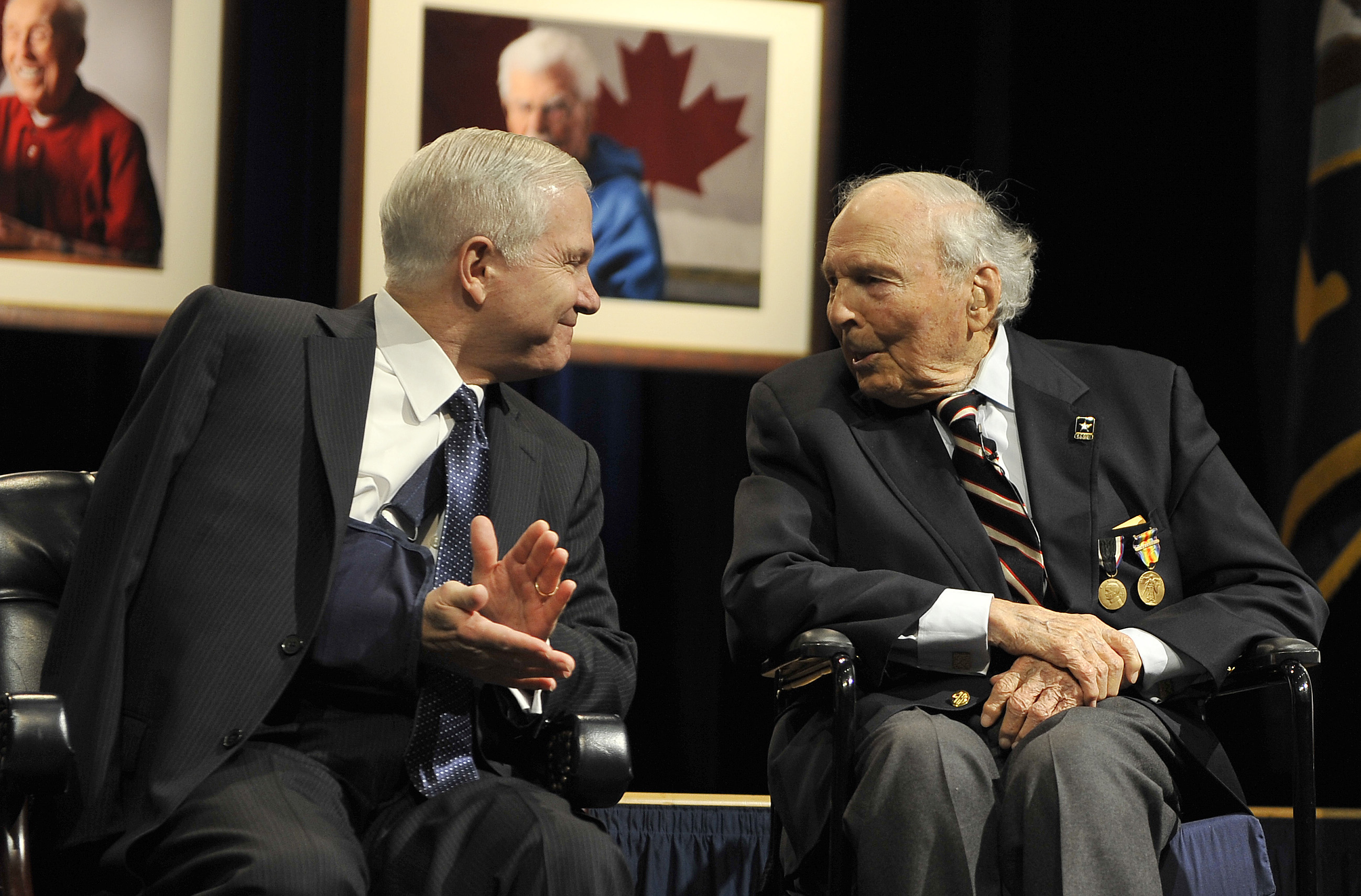
107-year-old Frank Buckles (right), meeting with Secretary of Defense Robert Gates in 2008. Buckles' death in 2011 reinvigorated efforts to pass legislation authorizing a memorial.

By summer 2012, D.C. officials, Norton, and their congressional supporters were pushing for a national World War I memorial at Pershing Park. The D.C. Council passed a nonbinding resolution to that effect in June. Norton's shift in attitude came after National Park Service officials convinced her that allowing construction on the Mall would severely weaken the Commemorative Works Act, to which a 2003 amendment had all but banned new memorials on the Mall. Meanwhile, discussion among members of Congress had turned toward giving the World War I Centennial Commission authority to build the new memorial. The centennial commission also concluded that there was no room on the Mall to build a memorial.

Rep. Poe reintroduced his memorial legislation (H.R. 222) on January 14, 2013, but it was never acted on. The World War I Memorial Act of 2014 (S. 2264; H.R. 4489), was introduced by McCaskill in the Senate and Cleaver in the House. Similar to the Poe legislation, the bills designated the Liberty Memorial as "a 'World War I Museum and Memorial'" and authorized a World War I Memorial in Washington, D.C, as "a 'World War I Museum and Memorial.'" They authorized the World War I Centennial Commission (rather than the World War I Memorial Foundation as in Poe's bill) to oversee design and construction of this memorial, and specified that it should be built in Pershing Park (rather than the Mall). The bills specifically barred the National World War I Memorial from interfering or encroaching on the D.C. memorial, which won them the backing of Delegate Norton, D.C. Council chair Phil Mendelson, and the World War I Centennial Commission—which had recommended the site. The memorial would cost about $10 million and retain the Pershing commemorative work already at the site. Edwin Fountain, now a member of the World War I Centennial Commission, pledged an open design competition and said that the commission would seek to have the memorial completed by November 11, 2018—the centennial of the closing date of the war.

Both bills were bitterly opposed by the World War I Memorial Foundation. Its president, David DeJonge, pressed for construction on the National Mall. Construction at Pershing Park, he said, "will contribute to a systematic extinction to the memory of World War I ... I think [this] is a grievous error."

With action on both the bills stalled, time was running out in the 113th Congress for action. McCaskill and Cleaver believed that if a memorial was to be built in time for the anniversary of the end of the war, authorization of a D.C. memorial could no longer wait. Cleaver and Poe met at the end of 2013, and Poe agreed to abandon his proposal so that a memorial could be built in time for the war's centennial. Cleaver conceived the idea of inserting the bill's language into the must-pass National Defense Authorization Act. When it (H.R. 4435) reached the House floor in May, Cleaver and Poe successfully co-sponsored an amendment to insert the memorial language into the bill. On December 2, the language of S. 2264/H.R. 4489 was again inserted into the defense bill as Subtitle J of Title XXX of Division B of H.R. 3979, the Carl Levin and Howard P. "Buck" McKeon National Defense Authorization Act for Fiscal Year 2015. H.R. 3979 (Note: The bill was introduced on January 31, 2014, as legislation to exclude emergency services volunteers from the Patient Protection and Affordable Care Act. The strict parliamentary rules of the House and Senate left H.R. 4435, the original defense authorization bill, too far back on the legislative calendar to be acted upon. So on December 4, 2014, the original language of H.R. 3979 was stripped out and the language of H.R. 4435 inserted. It was this amendment in the nature of a substitute which contained the text of McCaskill's and Cleaver's legislation.) had passed the House on March 11, and the Senate on April 7. After extensive debate and amendments, the House adopted the measure on December 3, and the Senate on December 12. President Obama signed the legislation into law on December 19, 2014 (Pub. L. 113–291 (text) (PDF)). With passage of the bill, the World War I Memorial Foundation suspended its effort to place the memorial on the National Mall.

=== Design competition ===
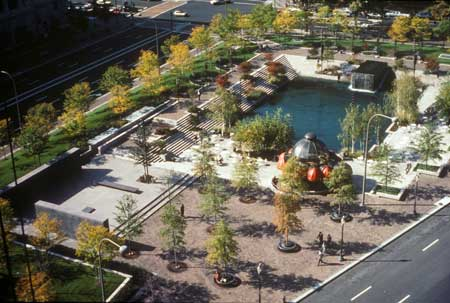
Aerial view of Pershing Park, about 2014

On May 20, 2015, the World War I Centennial Commission launched a design competition for the National World War I Memorial in Washington, D.C. The competition for the memorial, which the commission said should cost $21 million to $25 million, contained two phases. In Phase I, any member of the public from any country could submit a sketch and 250-word design proposal (along with a $100 submission fee) by July 21, 2015. A jury would select the three to five best entries, each of which would receive a $25,000 honorarium. The finalists, who would be announced on August 4, 2015, would proceed to Phase II, where they would pair with a professional design firm to flesh out their design and present it formally to the Commission. The commission hoped to have a ground-breaking on November 11, 2017 (Veterans Day).

The memorial site drew criticism in August 2015. Architect M. Paul Friedberg, who designed Pershing Park, told the Stars and Stripes that he was deeply upset by plans to destroy or radically change the park and threatened legal and other actions to have it preserved. Landscape architect Charles Birnbaum, founder and president of The Cultural Landscape Foundation, called Pershing Park Friedberg's "seminal work", and began a petition to have the park added to the National Register of Historic Places.

The jury was selected by members of the World War I Centennial Commission. The members of the jury were: (Note: The Centennial Commission also appointed a Design Oversight Committee (DOC) to serve as an advisor to the Jury on technical issues. Members of the DOC included representatives from the National Park Service, National Capital Planning Commission, United States Commission of Fine Arts, General Services Administration, United States Secret Service, American Battle Monuments Commission, District of Columbia Office of Planning, and Sandra Pershing (widow of Colonel John Warren Pershing, grandson of General John J. "Black Jack" Pershing). The Centennial Commission also established a subcommittee of its board of directors, known as the Governance Group, to coordinate the activities of the Jury and DOC, and to adjudicate any disputes. Members of the Governance Group were Mary Davidson Cohen, Ph.D., (former chair of the board of the National World War I Museum in Kansas City), Edwin Fountain, and Libby O'Connell, Ph.D. (historian).)

- Ethan Carr, Ph.D., FASLA – professor of landscape architecture at the University of Massachusetts Amherst
- Maurice Cox, FAIA – architect and urban design and planning expert
- Benjamin Forgey – journalist, author, and former architecture critic for The Washington Post.
- Harry G. Robinson III, FAIA – Dean Emeritus of the School of Architecture and Design at Howard University and former chairman of the United States Commission of Fine Arts
- John F. Shortal, Ph.D. – Brigadier General in the United States Army (retired) chief historian for the Joint Chiefs of Staff
- Allison Williams, FAIA – architect and design director for AECOM
- Jennifer Wingate, Ph.D. – Associate Professor of Fine Arts at St. Francis College

On August 19, 2015, the jury announced the five finalist designs for the memorial. They were:

- "An American Family Portrait", by STL Architects, Chicago, Illinois.
- "Heroes Green", by Counts Studio, Brooklyn, New York City, New York.
- "Plaza to the Forgotten War", by Johnsen Schmaling Architects, Milwaukee, Wisconsin.
- "The Weight of Sacrifice", by Joseph Weishaar of Brininstool+Lynch, Chicago, Illinois.
- "World War One Memorial Concept", by Kimmel Studio, Annapolis, Maryland.

=== Design reviews ===
In early November 2015, the Centennial Commission submitted the five finalist designs to the Commission of Fine Arts for its advice and approval. But the agency had strong criticisms of each of the designs. In a letter to the commission, Commission of Fine Arts Secretary Thomas Luebke wrote that "the competition designs appear to proceed from the underlying assumption that the existing park design is a failure, whereas its problems are the direct result of inadequate maintenance. They commented that many features of the park—such as the berms and other topographical elements which help create a sheltered space at the center of the park and which are eliminated in most of these schemes—are the very characteristics of the design that make the existing park an appropriate setting for a contemplative memorial. Thus, they criticized the competition program for understating the value and importance of the existing park design, and they encouraged conceiving of the project as a new memorial within an existing park." Washington City Paper reporter Kriston Capps noted that "none of the five finalist designs comes close to complying with the wishes of the CFA", but that it was still too early to say if the design process needed to be restarted.

The National Capital Planning Commission, the other federal agency with approval authority over the memorial, was scheduled to review the five designs on December 3, 2015.

The five finalists made formal submissions to the Centennial Commission in December 2015. In January 2016, it selected "The Weight of Sacrifice", by Joseph Weishaar, a 25-year-old architect who graduated from the University of Arkansas. He developed the design while he was an intern. Also selected was sculptor Sabin Howard, landscape architect Phoebe Lickwar (FORGE Landscape Architecture), and GWWO Inc./Architects.

=== Commission of Fine Arts approval ===
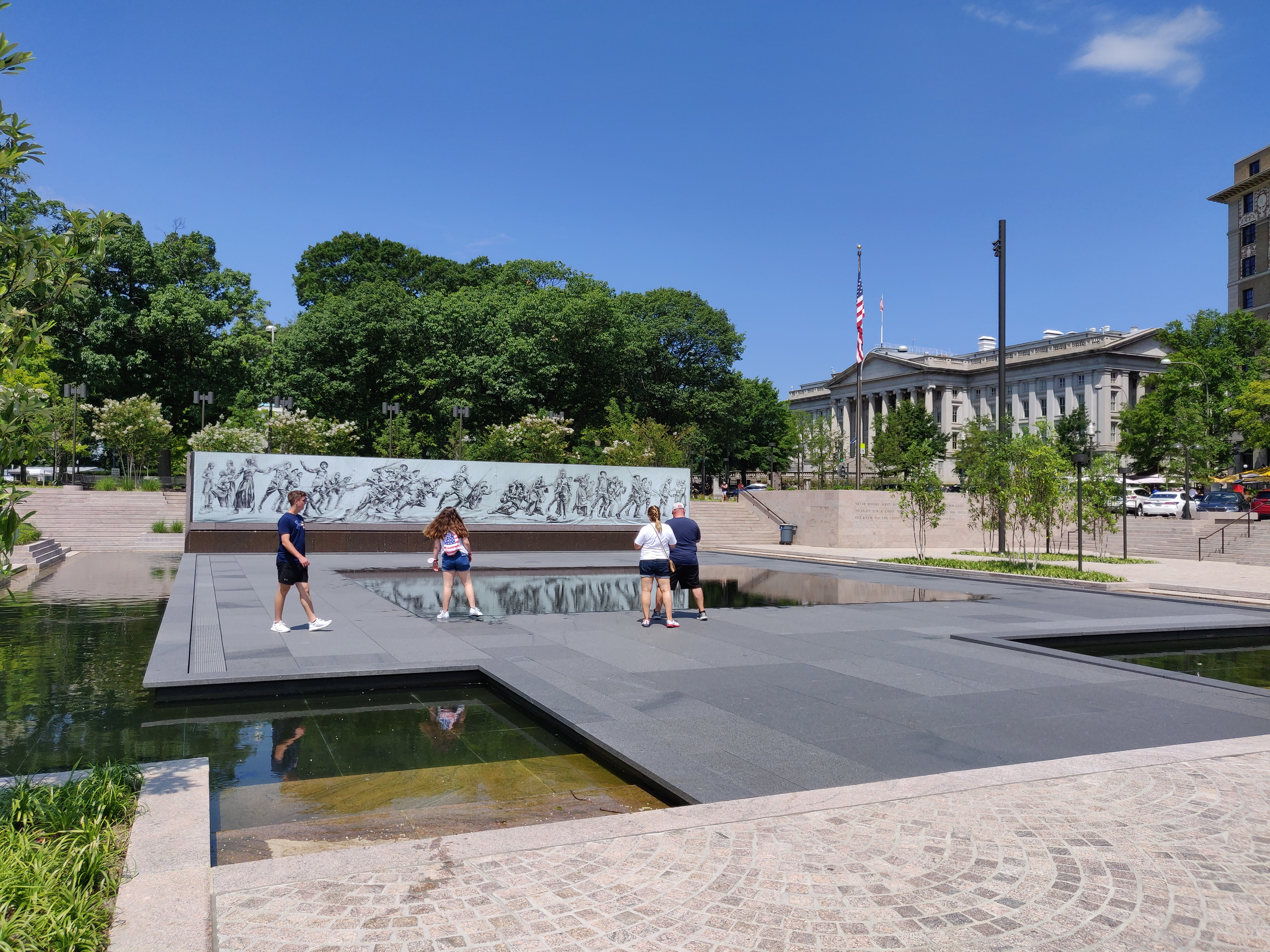
The memorial in 2021, following renovations. The relief mural on the far wall was added in 2024.

On July 19, 2018, the Commission of Fine Arts gave its approval to a modified memorial design. The changes replaced the existing fountain with a stand-alone wall featuring high-relief sculptures facing east. A cascade down the western side of the wall fed a scrim (which replaced the existing pool). The CFA required Howard to revise his sculpture design 18 times over 18 months before it gave final approval. Design approval by the NCPC and other agencies was still pending.

By Veterans Day 2018, the Centennial Commission said it had raised $20 million of the projected $40 million cost of the memorial. The organization was still aiming to dedicate the memorial in November 2021. In December 2019, it was announced that the memorial had received its building permit and work was set to begin. The first phase of the project includes rebuilding the existing park, with the addition of a peace fountain, pool basin, multiple berms and plazas and groves of trees. Rockville-based Grunley Construction Co. is the project's general contractor. The peace fountain is engraved with words from the poem "The Young Dead Soldiers" by Archibald MacLeish.

=== Groundbreaking ===
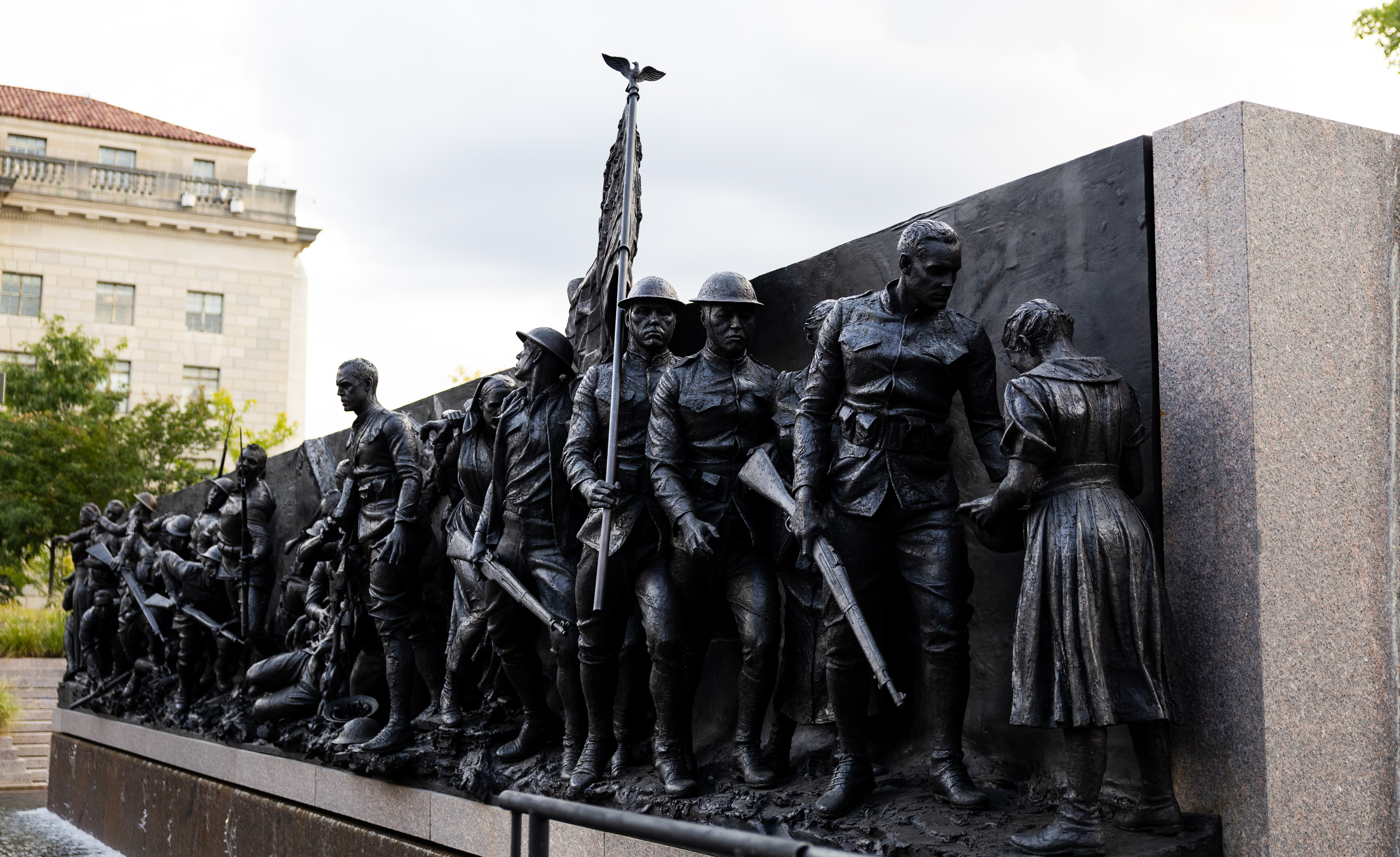
The relief mural entitled A Soldier's Journey, shown here as a close-up, was unveiled on September 13, 2024.

On November 9, 2017, the World War I Centennial Commission held a ceremonial groundbreaking event at Pershing Park. United States Secretary of Veterans Affairs David Shulkin, D.C. Mayor Muriel Bowser, U.S. Army Chief of Staff Gen. Mark A. Milley, and others participated in the groundbreaking.

Sabin Howard sculpted 38 figures for the bronze relief that are 10% larger than life-size in his studio in New Jersey. Each figure took 600 hours of work, even with 3D-printed armatures. The design, A Soldier's Journey, shows the story of a soldier who leaves his family, sees combat and the loss of comrades, and returns to his family after receiving medical care. It was cast in several pieces at the Pangolin Editions foundry in Stroud, England. The memorial was officially unveiled by the World War 1 Centennial Commission and the Doughboy foundation. It was completed in September 2024.

== See also ==
- List of national memorials of the United States
- World War II Memorial, in Washington, D.C.
- Architecture of Washington, D.C.

== Bibliography ==
- Committee on Natural Resources (December 12, 2012). Frank Buckles World War I Memorial Act. H.Rept. 112-701. U.S. House of Representatives. 112th Cong., 2d sess (PDF) (Report). Washington, D.C.: U.S. Government Printing Office.
- Donovan, Derek (2001). Lest the Ages Forget: Kansas City's Liberty Memorial. Kansas City: Kansas City Star Books. ISBN 9780971292017.
- Fortier, Alison; O'Hanlon, Gregory; Snyder, Joseph Harrison (2014). A History Lover's Guide to Washington, D.C.: Designed for Democracy. Charleston, S.C.: History Press. ISBN 9781625850645.
- Mills, Nicolaus (2004). Their Last Battle: The Fight for the National World War II Memorial. New York: Basic Books. ISBN 9780465045822.
- Wingate, Jennifer (2013). Sculpting Doughboys: Memory, Gender, and Taste in America's World War I Memorials. Burlington, Vt.: Ashgate. ISBN 9781409406556.
