= Sabin Howard =

American sculptor

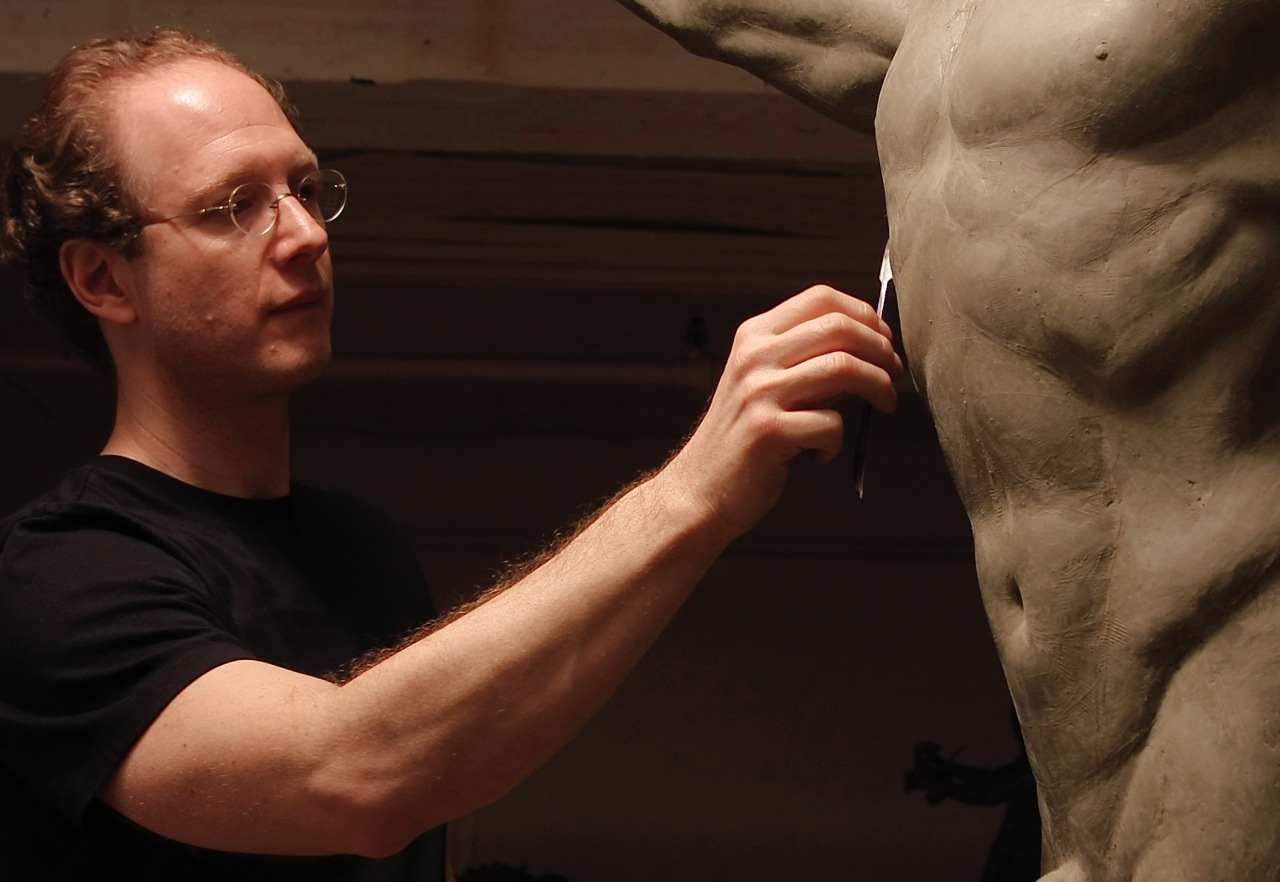
- Born: 1963 (age 62–63); New York, U.S.
- Occupation: Sculptor
- Notable work: Hermes; Apollo; Aphrodite; National WWI Memorial
- Spouse: Traci L. Slatton

Sabin Howard (born 1963) is an American classical figurative sculptor based in New York City, with a studio in Englewood, New Jersey. He is a board member of the National Sculpture Society. His work has been shown at numerous solo and group shows. He is the sculptor for a project entitled "The Weight of Sacrifice" that was one of five finalists and the eventual winner of the commission for the World War I Memorial in Pershing Park, Washington D.C. The final relief sculpture, entitled A Soldier's Journey, was revealed to the public on September 13, 2024. His notable works include the recent National WWI Memorial sculpture. Howard is the creator of the large-scale pieces Hermes, Aphrodite, and Apollo, as well as many smaller pieces. His works are owned by private collectors and museums including The Mount, Edith Wharton's home.

Art critic James Cooper wrote in 2012: "Howard’s sculptures have content as well as exquisite form".

Howard co-wrote a book called The Art Of Life with his novelist wife Traci L. Slatton.

As part of a team put together by a young architect, Joseph Weishaar, Sabin was selected to create the sculpture at the National World War I Memorial in Washington D.C. He sculpted A Soldier's Journey, a 60 foot long bronze relief installed at the National World War I Memorial in Washington DC, and formally unveiled on Sep 13, 2024.
