= Quick Quack Car Wash =

American car wash company

- Industry: Car Wash
- Founded: 2004
- Headquarters: Roseville, California
- Key people: Jason Johnson, Tim Wright, Greg Drennan, Chris Vaterlaus, Travis Kimball
- Number of employees: 2,000+
- Website: www.quickquack.com/

Quick Quack Car Wash is a company that provides exterior car washes. The company is based in Sacramento, California with operations in Utah, Texas, Colorado, Arizona, California, Oklahoma, Nevada, and Washington. In 2008, Quick Quack Car Wash was listed on Inc. Magazine’s fastest growing companies. According to Professional Carwashing & Detailing, an industry publication, Quick Quack Car Wash was the 4th largest car wash chain in the United States in 2025 with 340 locations.

Tim Wright currently serves as the President and Jason Johnson as the CEO of the company. Travis Kimball serves as the Chief Experience Officer.

== History ==
Quick Quack Car Wash was founded in 2004 by Jason Johnson and his father-in-law, Clif Conrad, who operated a car wash in Utah. Johnson and Conrad formed a partnership with Tim Wright, Greg Drennan, Chris Vaterlaus and Travis Kimball. Conrad left the company in 2007.

The company initially operated under the name Splash & Dash Car Wash. In 2008, it purchased Amarillo, TX-based Quick Quack Car Wash and opted to operate all of its locations under that name. In 2024, KKR acquired an $850 million stake in Quick Quack Car Wash.

In 2025, Quick Quack Car Wash expanded into Nevada with four locations and Washington with four locations.

== Company ==
Quick Quack Car Wash provides exterior-only express car washes. The company states that it utilizes eco-friendly techniques such as reclaiming water used and using biodegradable and non-toxic cleansers. It was the first car wash company in Sacramento to get certified as a sustainable business and it was certified green by the Sacramento Business Environmental Resource Center.

== Awards ==
In 2007, the company was named one of the "Top 50 Car Washes in the Country" by Modern Car Care magazine. In 2013, Quick Quack Car Wash was named the "Best Car Wash" by Sacramento Magazine. It also took the award in 2011 and 2012. Quick Quack Car Wash won the 2011, 2012, and 2013 award for "Best Car Wash" by the Amarillo Globe-News. In 2012, ColoradoSprings.com gave Quick Quack Car Wash the Gold award for its car wash services.

Quick Quack Car Wash was voted the best Car Wash in multiple regions. In Sacramento, CA region the company won "Best of Sacramento" in 2016, City Voters "A-List" in 2015, 2016 & 2017, The Press Tribune's "Best of the Best" in 2013, 2016 & 2017, Citrus Heights Chamber's "Best of Citrus Heights" in 2016 & 2017, Folsom Telegraph's "Best of the Best" in 2017 and the Sacramento County Business Environmental Resource Center recognized Quick Quack Car Wash for its water conservation efforts with a 2014 Sustainable Business of the Year Award.

In 2024, Quick Quack Car Wash won Glassdoor’s Best-Led Companies award. In 2025, Quick Quack Car Wash was named to Yelp’s 50 “Most Loved Brands” list.
