= Battle of Auburn =

Battle of Auburn may refer to two battles fought October 13–14, 1863, in northern Virginia during the Bristoe Campaign of the American Civil War:

- First Battle of Auburn, October 13, 1863
- Second Battle of Auburn, October 14, 1863

== See also ==
- Auburn (disambiguation)
