= 99th Pennsylvania Infantry Regiment =

Union Army infantry regiment

99th Regiment Pennsylvania Volunteer Infantry
- Active: July 26, 1861, to July 1, 1865
- Country: United States
- Allegiance: Union
- Branch: Infantry
- Engagements: Battle of Groveton; Second Battle of Bull Run; Battle of Chantilly; Battle of Fredericksburg; Battle of Chancellorsville; Battle of Gettysburg; Battle of Wapping Heights; Bristoe Campaign; First Battle of Auburn; Second Battle of Rappahannock Station; Mine Run Campaign; Battle of Mine Run; Battle of the Wilderness; Battle of Spotsylvania Court House; Battle of Cold Harbor; Siege of Petersburg; First Battle of Deep Bottom; Second Battle of Deep Bottom; Battle of Peebles' Farm; Battle of Boydton Plank Road; Battle of Hatcher's Run; Battle of Fort Stedman; Appomattox Campaign; Battle of Sailor's Creek; Battle of Appomattox

The 99th Regiment Pennsylvania Volunteer Infantry was an infantry regiment that served in the Union Army during the American Civil War.

== Service ==
The 99th Pennsylvania Infantry was organized at Philadelphia, Pennsylvania July 26, 1861, through January 18, 1862, as the 32nd Pennsylvania Infantry (not to be confused with the 3rd Pennsylvania Reserves/32nd Pennsylvania Infantry). Three companies moved to Washington, DC on August 8, 1861, and the regiment was eventually mustered in for a three-year enlistment under the command of Colonel Thomas Sweeney. The regimental designation was officially changed in February 1862.

The regiment was attached to Defenses of Washington, D.C., to October 1861. Jameson's Brigade, Heintzelman's Division, Army of the Potomac, to February 1862. Military District of Washington to June 1862. 3rd Brigade, 3rd Division, III Corps, Army of the Potomac, to August 1863. 3rd Brigade, 1st Division, III Corps, to December 1862. 2nd Brigade, 1st Division, III Corps, to August 1868. 3rd Brigade, 1st Division, III Corps, to October 1863. 2nd Brigade, 1st Division, III Corps, to March 1864. 1st Brigade, 3rd Division, II Corps, to July 1865.

The 99th Pennsylvania Infantry mustered out July 1, 1865.

== Detailed service ==
Duty in the defenses of Washington, D.C., until June 29, 1862. Moved to Harrison's Landing June 29-July 4, and duty there until August 16. Movement to Fortress Monroe, then to Centreville August 16–26. Pope's Campaign in northern Virginia August 26-September 2. Battle of Groveton August 29. Second Battle of Bull Run August 30. Battle of Chantilly September 1. Duty in the Defenses of Washington, D.C., and outpost picket duty until October. White's Ford, Md., October 12. Movement up the Potomac to Leesburg, then to Falmouth, Va., October 11-November 19. Battle of Fredericksburg December 12–15. Burnside's 2nd Campaign, "Mud March," January 20–24, 1863. At Falmouth until April. Chancellorsville Campaign April 27-May 6. Battle of Chancellorsville May 1–5. Gettysburg Campaign June 11-July 24. Battle of Gettysburg July 1–3.

This is Pennsylvania, and our home. —99th Pennsylvania's battle cry, witnessed by Corporal Peter Ears, Co. E, during the 99th Pennsylvania's bayonet charge at Devil's Den, Gettysburg, July 2, 1863

Pursuit of Lee July 5–24. Wapping Heights, Va., July 23. Duty on line of the Rappahannock until October. Bristoe Campaign October 9–22. Auburn October 13. Advance to line of the Rappahannock November 7–8. Kelly's Ford November 7. Mine Run Campaign November 26-December 2. Payne's Farm November 27. Demonstration on the Rapidan February 6–7, 1864. Duty near Brandy Station until May. Rapidan Campaign May 4-June 12. Battles of the Wilderness May 5–7. Laurel Hill May 8. Spotsylvania May 8–12. Po River May 10. Spotsylvania Court House May 12–21. Assault on the Salient May 12. Harris Farm, Fredericksburg Road May 19. North Anna River May 23–26. On line of the Pamunkey May 26–28. Totopotomoy May 28–31. Cold Harbor June 1–12. Before Petersburg June 16–18. Siege of Petersburg June 16, 1864, to April 2, 1865. Jerusalem Plank Road June 21–23, 1864. Demonstration on north side of the James at Deep Bottom July 27–29. Deep Bottom July 27–28. Mine Explosion, Petersburg, July 30 (reserve). Demonstration on north side of the James River at Deep Bottom August 13–18. Strawberry Plains, Deep Bottom, August 14–18. Poplar Springs Church September 29-October 2. Boydton Plank Road, Hatcher's Run, October 27–28. Raid on Weldon Railroad December 7–12. Dabney's Mills, Hatcher's Run, February 5–7, 1865. Watkins' House, Petersburg, March 25. Appomattox Campaign March 28-April 9. Crow's House March 31. Fall of Petersburg April 2. Sailor's Creek April 6. High Bridge, Farmville, April 7. Appomattox Court House April 9. Surrender of Lee and his army. At Burkesville until May 2. March to Washington, D.C., May 2–12. Grand Review of the Armies May 23.

== Casualties ==
The regiment lost a total of 235 men during service; 9 officers and 113 enlisted men killed or mortally wounded, 1 officer and 112 enlisted men died of disease.

== Commanders ==
- Colonel Thomas Sweeney - resigned January 24, 1862
- Colonel Peter Fritz, Sr. - resigned June 10, 1862
- Colonel Asher S. Leidy
- Colonel Edwin Ruthwin Biles
- Major John W. Moore - commanded at the Battle of Gettysburg until wounded in action
- Captain Peter Fritz, Jr. - commanded at the Battle of Gettysburg after Maj Moore was wounded and returned to command on July 3

== Notable members ==
- 1st Lieutenant Sylvester Bonnaffon, Jr., Company G - Medal of Honor recipient for action at the Battle of Boydton Plank Road
- Sergeant Charles H. Fasnacht, Company A - Medal of Honor recipient for action at the Battle of Spotsylvania Court House
- Sergeant Albert Magnin, Company C - Pennsylvania State Representative for Delaware County, 1889-1892
- Sergeant Harvey M. Munsell, Company A - Medal of Honor recipient for action at the Battle of Gettysburg, July 1–3; color sergeant who carried the regiment's colors through 13 battles

== See also ==
- List of Pennsylvania Civil War Units
- Pennsylvania in the Civil War
