= Sylvester Bonnaffon Jr. =

American soldier and Medal of Honor recipient

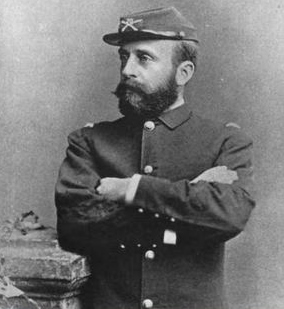
- Col. Sylvester Bonnaffon, Jr., 1912
- Born: September 14, 1844; Philadelphia, Pennsylvania, US
- Died: April 12, 1922 (aged 77); Philadelphia, Pennsylvania, US
- Military career
- Allegiance: United States
- Branch: United States Army (Union Army)
- Service years: 1861–1865
- Rank: Captain; Brevet lieutenant colonel
- Unit: 99th Regiment Pennsylvania Volunteer Infantry - Company G
- Conflicts: See battles: American Civil War; Second Battle of Bull Run; Battle of Chantilly; Battle of Fredericksburg; Battle of Chancellorsville; Battle of Gettysburg; Battle of Wapping Heights; Bristoe campaign; First Battle of Auburn; Second Battle of Rappahannock Station; Battle of Mine Run; Overland Campaign; Battle of the Wilderness; Battle of Spotsylvania Court House; Battle of North Anna; Battle of Cold Harbor; Siege of Petersburg; First Battle of Deep Bottom; Second Battle of Deep Bottom; Battle of Peebles's Farm; Battle of Boydton Plank Road
- Awards: Medal of Honor

Sylvester Bonnaffon Jr. (September 14, 1844 – May 12, 1922) was a United States soldier who fought with the Union Army during the American Civil War as a first lieutenant with Company G of the 99th Pennsylvania Infantry. He received his nation's highest award for valor, the U.S. Medal of Honor, for his gallantry and leadership against Confederate troops during the Battle of Boydton Plank Road, Virginia on October 27, 1864. That award was conferred on September 29, 1893.

Also brevetted twice for "gallant and meritorious services during the War", he enrolled with the Pennsylvania National Guard post-war, rising through the ranks to command the 20th Regiment Infantry (emergency) during the Pittsburgh railroad strike of 1877.

== Early years ==
Born in Philadelphia, Pennsylvania on September 14, 1844, Sylvester Bonnaffon Jr., was a son of Philadelphia natives Albert L. Bonnaffon and Adaline Frances (McClintock) Bonnaffon. He was reared and educated in Philadelphia with his siblings: Josephine, who later wed Edmund G. Walters; Adeline, who was born circa 1847; Albert, who was born circa 1849; Charles Albert; Imogen, who later wed George Moore Neall; and Eugenia, who went on to marry Frank T. Anderson in 1884.

== Civil War ==
Nineteen-year-old Sylvester Bonnaffon Jr. enrolled for military service in Philadelphia, Pennsylvania on December 14, 1861, and mustered in there that same day as a private with Company I of the 99th Pennsylvania Volunteer Infantry. Transferring to Company G within the same regiment on December 18, he was then promoted to the rank of corporal on April 1, 1862, and to the rank of sergeant a month later (on May 1). Commissioned as a second lieutenant on August 1 of that same year, he subsequently engaged with his regiment in several of the most intense actions of the American Civil War as part of the Union's Army of the Potomac, including 1862's Second Battle of Bull Run (August 28–30) and battles of Chantilly (September 1) and Fredericksburg (December 11–15); 1863's Chancellorsville Campaign (April 30–May 6), battles of Gettysburg (July 1–3) and Wapping Heights (July 23), Bristoe Campaign and its First Battle of Auburn (October 13) and Second Battle of Rappahannock Station (November 7), and the Mine Run Campaign (November 27–December 2); and 1864's battles of the Wilderness (May 5–7), Spottsylvania Court House (May 8–21), North Anna (May 23–26), and Cold Harbor (May 31–June 12). Engaged with his regiment in the Siege of Petersburg, including the First and Second Battles of Deep Bottom (July 27–29, 1864 and August 14–20), he was then advanced in rank again with a commission to first lieutenant on September 27.

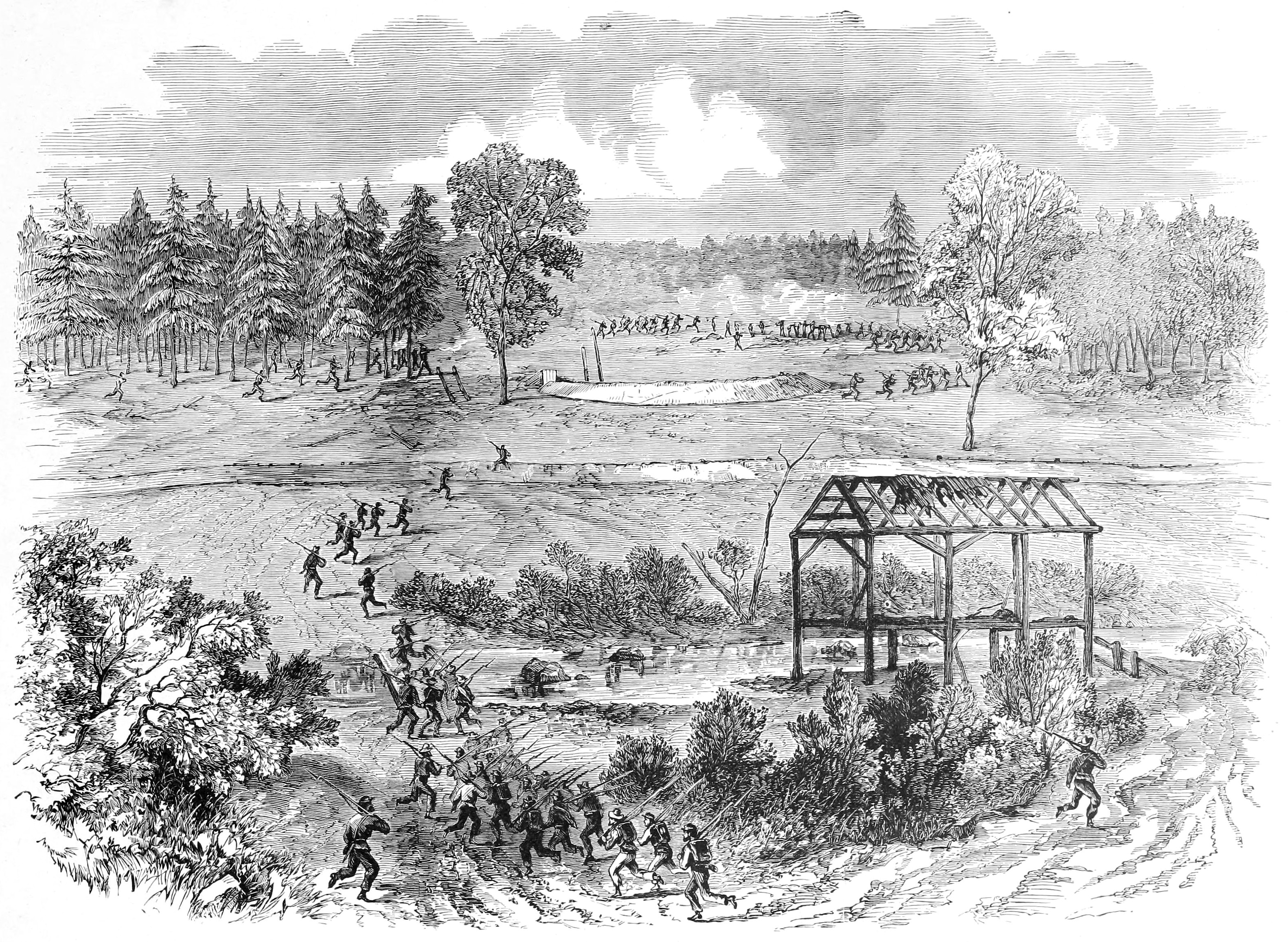
Battle of Boydton Plank Road, Virginia, October 27, 1864 (Frank Leslie's Illustrated Newspaper).

After fighting with his regiment in the Battle of Peebles's Farm (September 30–October 2), Bonnaffon then performed the act of valor which resulted in his being awarded the U.S. Medal of Honor. While leading his men in the Battle of Boydton Plank Road, Virginia on October 27, 1864, as a member of Brigadier-General Regis De Trobriand's staff (2nd Corps, 1st Brigade, 3rd Division), he was severely wounded in action as he rallied his troops "in the face of a terrible fire of musketry", according to his Medal of Honor citation. Inspired by his leadership, his men went on to check what was shaping up to be a Confederate States Army rout of the Union Army that day.

Bonnaffon was subsequently commended in Trobriand's battle report and also twice brevetted in recognition of his service to his nation, first as a major and then, on March 13, 1865, as a lieutenant colonel. His regiment having completed its service in the Appomattox Campaign, he then received a permanent advancement in rank with a commission at the rank of captain at Brandy Station, Virginia on April 20, 1865. On July 1 of that same year, he honorably mustered out with his company.

== Later life ==
Following his honorable discharge from the military, Bonnaffon returned home to Pennsylvania and, in 1866, wed Virginia Victoria Walters, daughter of Albert G. and Virginia (Souder) Walters. On January 11, 1867, they had their first child, Samuel Ashton Bonnaffon.

Sylvester Bonnaffon, Jr. then re-enlisted for military service once again—this time with the Pennsylvania National Guard's 1st Regiment Infantry (also known as the "Gray Reserves"). After enlisting as a private on October 15, 1868, he was promoted to the rank of first lieutenant with Company H on March 2, 1870. Detailed as acting regimental adjutant in January 1871, he then served as captain of that same company from June 14, 1871, to September 14, 1872, and was honorably discharged on September 4, 1874.

On October 4, 1875, he and his wife had twins Sylvester Bonnaffon, III and Edmund Walters Bonnaffon. Like their father before them, both went on to pursue careers in the military, serving during World War I.

In 1877, his services were called upon again when multiple members of the PNG were mustered in to restore order during the Pittsburgh railroad strike. Commissioned as colonel and placed in charge of the 20th Regiment, which had been specially raised in response to the emergency, he led his troops from July through September, during which time his troops also helped to quell unrest between coal miners and other residents of Pennsylvania's Lehigh and Wyoming valleys, including within the cities of Scranton and Wilkes-Barre. Appointed as a major with the artillery of the Washington Grays, he served from March 22 to July 20, 1879, and was then re-commissioned as a colonel by the PNG on January 14, 1880. Placed in command of the Third Infantry Regiment, he held that position for exactly one decade.

From 1890 until the time of his retirement on August 20, 1920, Bonnaffon was employed by the Customs House in Philadelphia, working his way up from positions as examiner and assistant cashier to cashier. Earlier that same year, he was preceded in death by his brother, Charles, a long-time jeweler in Philadelphia who was fatally burned in a fire on January 29, 1920, caused by smoking in bed.

== Death ==
Sylvester Bonnaffon, Jr. died on May 12, 1922, in Philadelphia, Pennsylvania, and had funeral services on May 16 at the Church of the Transfiguration.

== Medal of Honor citation ==
He received his Medal of Honor for his actions against Confederate forces at Boydton Plank Road, Virginia on October 27, 1864, where he was wounded. Rank and organization: First Lieutenant, Company G, 99th Pennsylvania Infantry Regiment. His Medal was issued on September 29, 1893.

Citation:

Checked the rout and rallied the troops of his command in the face of a terrible fire of musketry; was severely wounded.

== See also ==
- List of Medal of Honor recipients
- List of American Civil War Medal of Honor recipients: A–F
- Pennsylvania in the American Civil War
