= Battle of Bristoe Station =

1863 battle of the American Civil War

- Part of the American Civil War
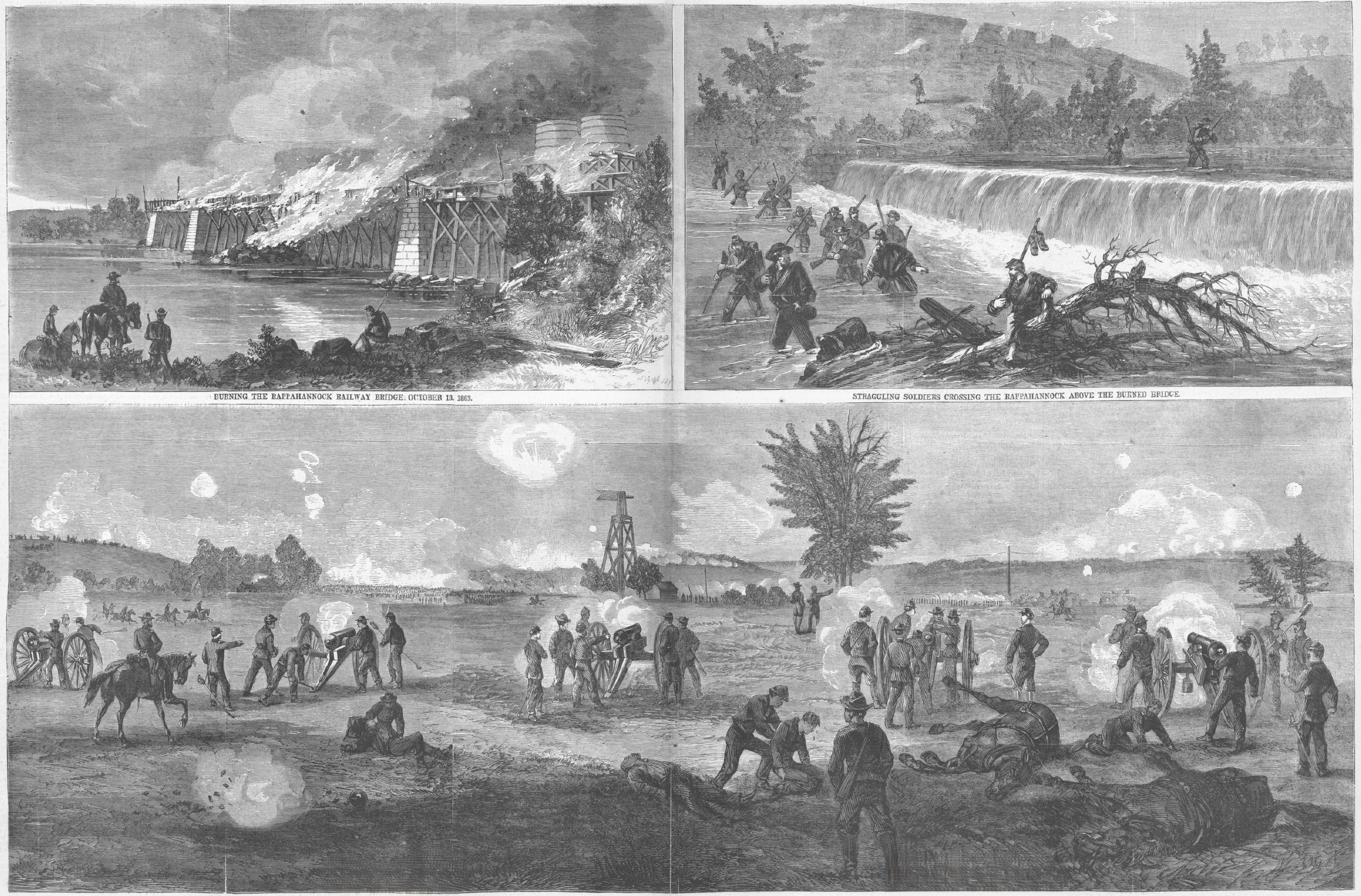
- General Warren repelling Hoth's attack at Bristoe Station (lower image, Harper's Weekly, 1863)
Date	October 14, 1863
Location	Prince William County, Virginia 38.7234°N 77.5418°W
Result	Union victory

Belligerents
United States	Confederate States

Commanders and leaders
Gouverneur K. Warren	A. P. Hill

Units involved
II Corps, Army of the Potomac	Third Corps, Army of Northern Virginia

Strength
8,383	17,218

Casualties and losses
540	1,380

The Battle of Bristoe Station was fought on October 14, 1863, at Bristoe Station, Virginia, between Union forces under Maj. Gen. Gouverneur K. Warren and Confederate forces under Lt. Gen. A. P. Hill during the Bristoe Campaign of the American Civil War. The Union II Corps under Warren was able to surprise and repel the Confederate attack by Hill on the Union rearguard, resulting in a Union victory.

== Background ==
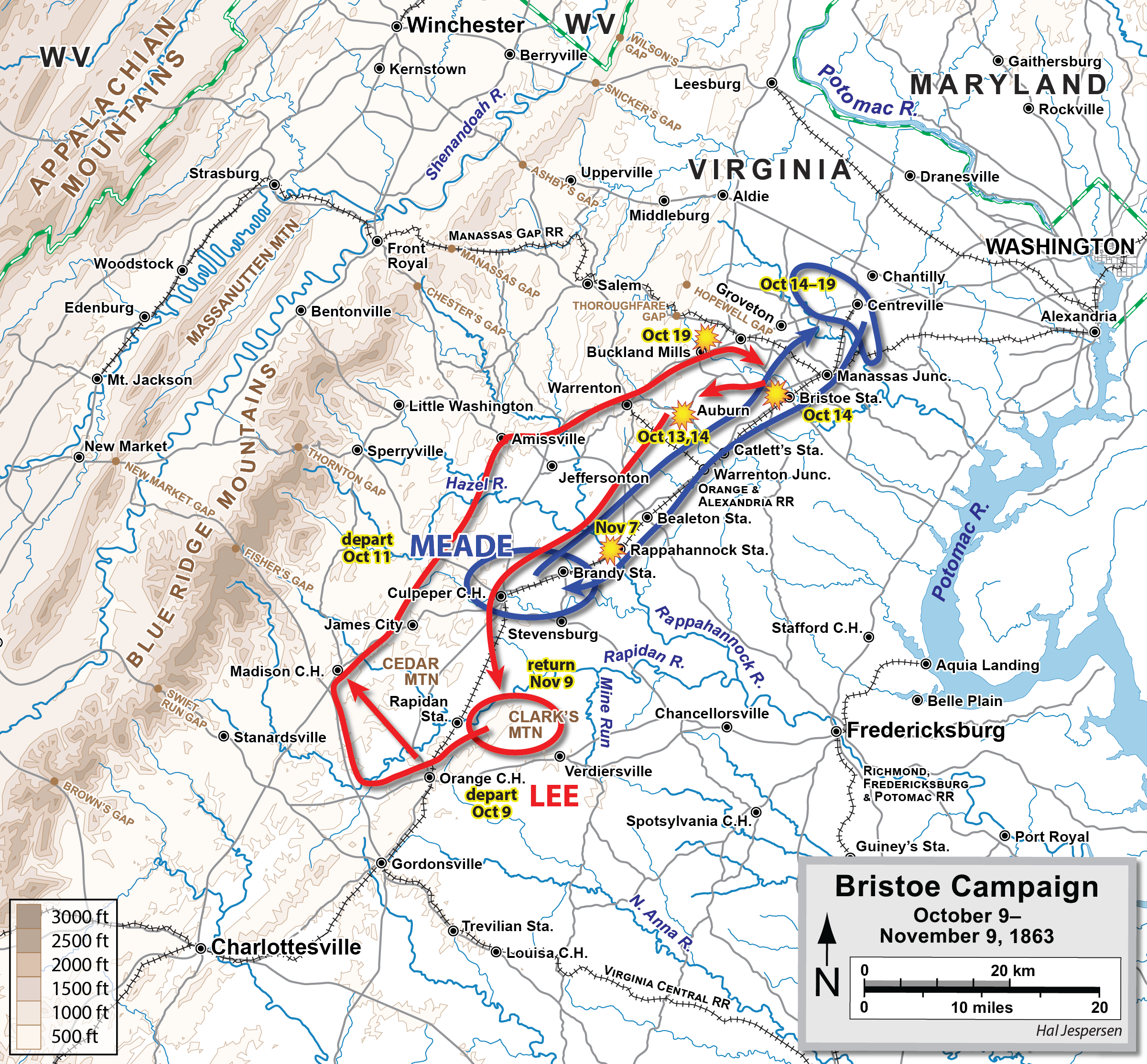
Bristoe Campaign Confederate Union

The Union army was led by Maj. Gen. George G. Meade, the Confederates by General Robert E. Lee. Lee had stolen a march, passing around Cedar Mountain, the site of a battle in 1862. This forced Meade to retreat toward Centreville. By withdrawing, Meade prevented Lee from falling on an exposed flank of the Army of the Potomac. Maj. Gen. Gouverneur K. Warren, commanding II Corps in Maj. Gen. Winfield S. Hancock's absence, was following V Corps on this retreat. On October 13, II Corps fought an encounter with Maj. Gen. J. E. B. Stuart's cavalry near Auburn, Virginia, the First Battle of Auburn, nicknamed "Coffee Hill" (Confederate shells interrupted Federals who were boiling coffee). Warren had to push Stuart aside and, at the same time, retreat before the advance of the Confederate corps of Lt. Gen. Richard S. Ewell. On October 14, as Warren moved toward Bristoe Station, Stuart's cavalry harassed the rear guard at the Second Battle of Auburn.

Lt. Gen. A. P. Hill, leading the Confederate Third Corps, was advancing on Ewell's left. He reached Bristoe Station on October 14. (The town is variously called Bristoe, Bristow, and Bristo in contemporary newspapers.) Hill tried to harass the rearguard of V Corps just across Broad Run, but he missed the presence of II Corps just coming up from Auburn. Seeing Heth's advance, Warren rapidly deployed his forces behind an embankment of the Orange and Alexandria Railroad near Bristoe Station. The result was a powerful ambush as Hill's corps moved to attack the Union rear guard across Broad Run.

== Battle ==
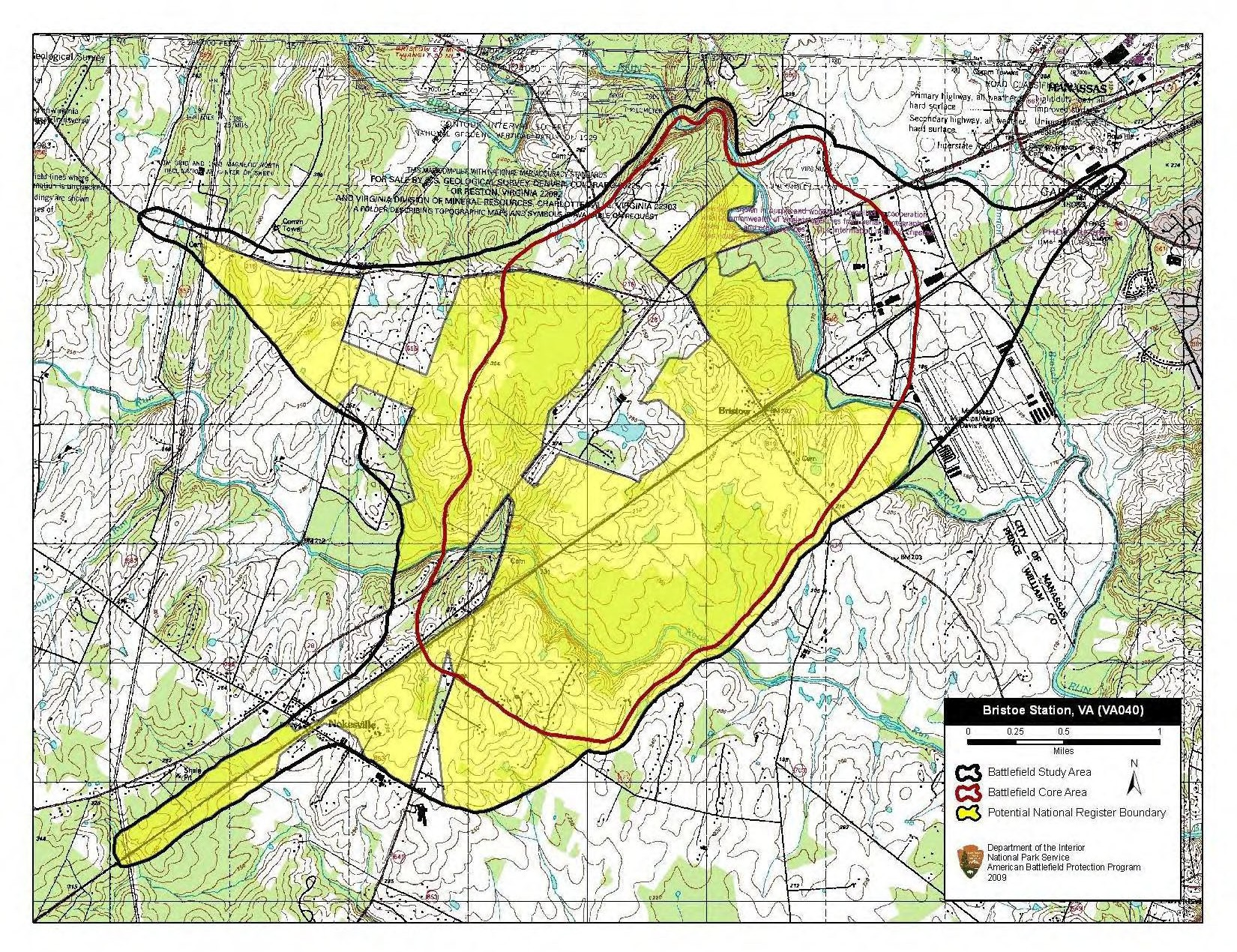
Map of Bristoe Station Battlefield core and study areas by the American Battlefield Protection Program

Maj. Gen. Henry Heth's division moved to attack V Corps, but it was redirected to attack II Corps. Union artillery, including the battery of Capt. R. Bruce Ricketts, opened fire on the Confederates; and infantry fire soon was added. Despite this, Heth's men briefly secured a foothold in the lines of Col. James E. Mallon in the second division under Brig. Gen. Alexander S. Webb. The Confederates were driven back, and five guns of a Confederate battery were captured in a federal counterattack. Col. Mallon was killed in the fighting. The Confederate division of Maj. Gen. Richard H. Anderson attacked the lines of Brig. Gen. Alexander Hays's division and was also repelled. Brig. Gen. Carnot Posey was mortally wounded in that attack. Two of Heth's brigade commanders, William Whedbee Kirkland and John Rogers Cooke, were badly wounded.

== Aftermath ==
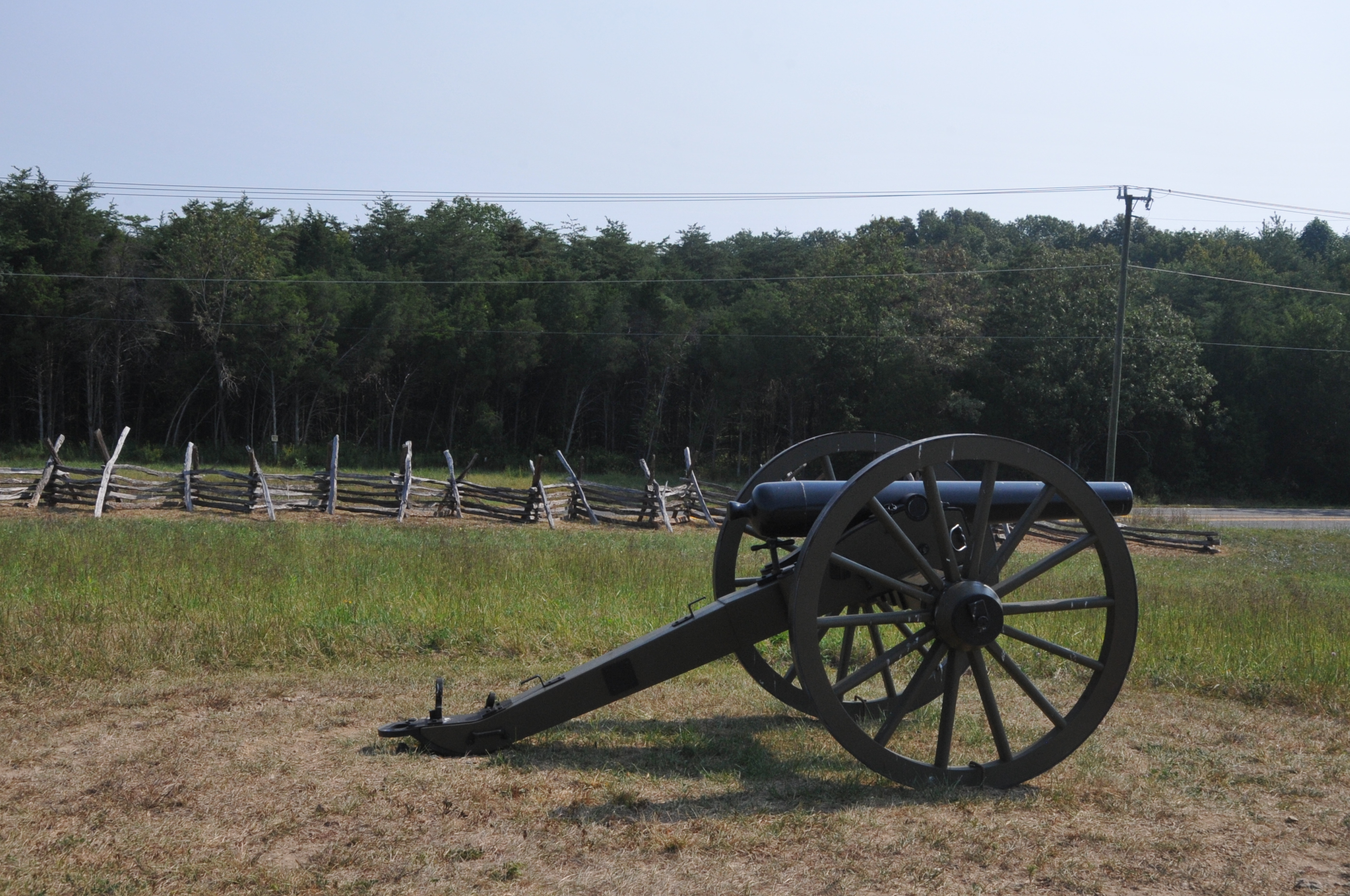
Park at the site of the battle

Union casualties were 540, Confederate about 1,380. Warren, seeing Lt. Gen. Richard S. Ewell's Second Corps coming up on his left, eventually had to withdraw. Lee is said to have cut off Hill's excuses for this defeat by saying, "Well, well, general, bury these poor men and let us say no more about it." The Union forces won the battle, but they had to retreat to Centreville, Virginia, before standing their ground. When they pulled back, starting on October 18, the Confederates destroyed much of the Orange and Alexandria Railroad. Meade had to rebuild the railroad when he reoccupied the area around Bristoe Station. Warren won such reputation as a corps commander that he was given V Corps as a regular assignment after Hancock returned to the Army of the Potomac in 1864.

== Battlefield preservation ==
The American Battlefield Trust and its partners have acquired and preserved more than 308 acres (1.25 km^{2}) of the battlefield through mid-2023. However, the Prince William County Board of Supervisors approved the development of the remaining 1,500 acres on which the Battle of Bristoe Station occurred. Centex Homes allowed the Civil War Trust 90 days to find and exhume all of the remains that they could find before they converted the battlefield into a residential housing development.
