= Catlett Historic District =

Historic district in Virginia, United States

- U.S. National Register of Historic Places
- U.S. Historic district
- Virginia Landmarks Register
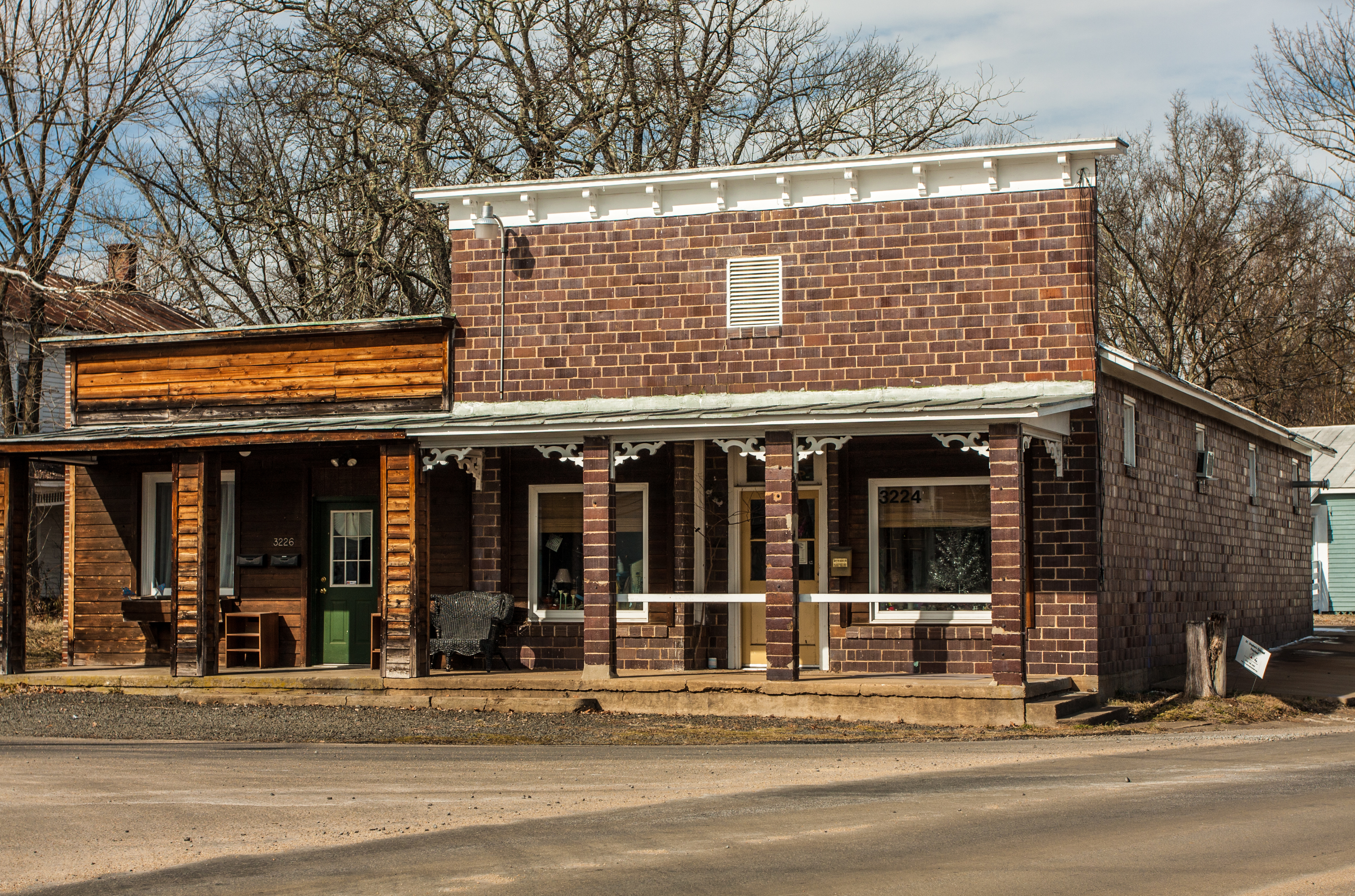
- Old commercial building at corner of Old Catlett Rd. and Elk Run Rd.

- Location within Northern Virginia Location within Virginia Location within the United States
- Location: Prospect Ave., & parts of Gaskins Ln., Tenerife, Elk Run, Old Catlett, Catlett, Old Dumfries & Catlett School Rds., Catlett, Virginia
- Coordinates: 38°29′28″N 77°43′03″W
- Area: 118 acres (48 ha)
- Built: 1855
- Built by: Waite, Harlan P.
- Architectural style: Greek Revival, Colonial Revival
- NRHP reference No.: 08000069
- VLR No.: 030-5162

Significant dates
- Added to NRHP: February 21, 2008
- Designated VLR: December 5, 2007

Catlett Historic District is a national historic district located at Catlett, Fauquier County, Virginia. It encompasses 119 contributing buildings, 2 contributing sites, and 11 contributing structures in the rural village of Catlett. It contains a collection of buildings that represent the town during the late 19th and early-to-mid 20th centuries. Notable buildings include Prospect Acres (c. 1855), Edmonds Place (c. 1870), Trenis House, the Gothic Revival style Trinity Church (1872), the former Ensor's Store, Leidy Wilson's Store, and the Wilson Farms Meat Company.

It was listed on the National Register of Historic Places in 2008.

== Gallery ==
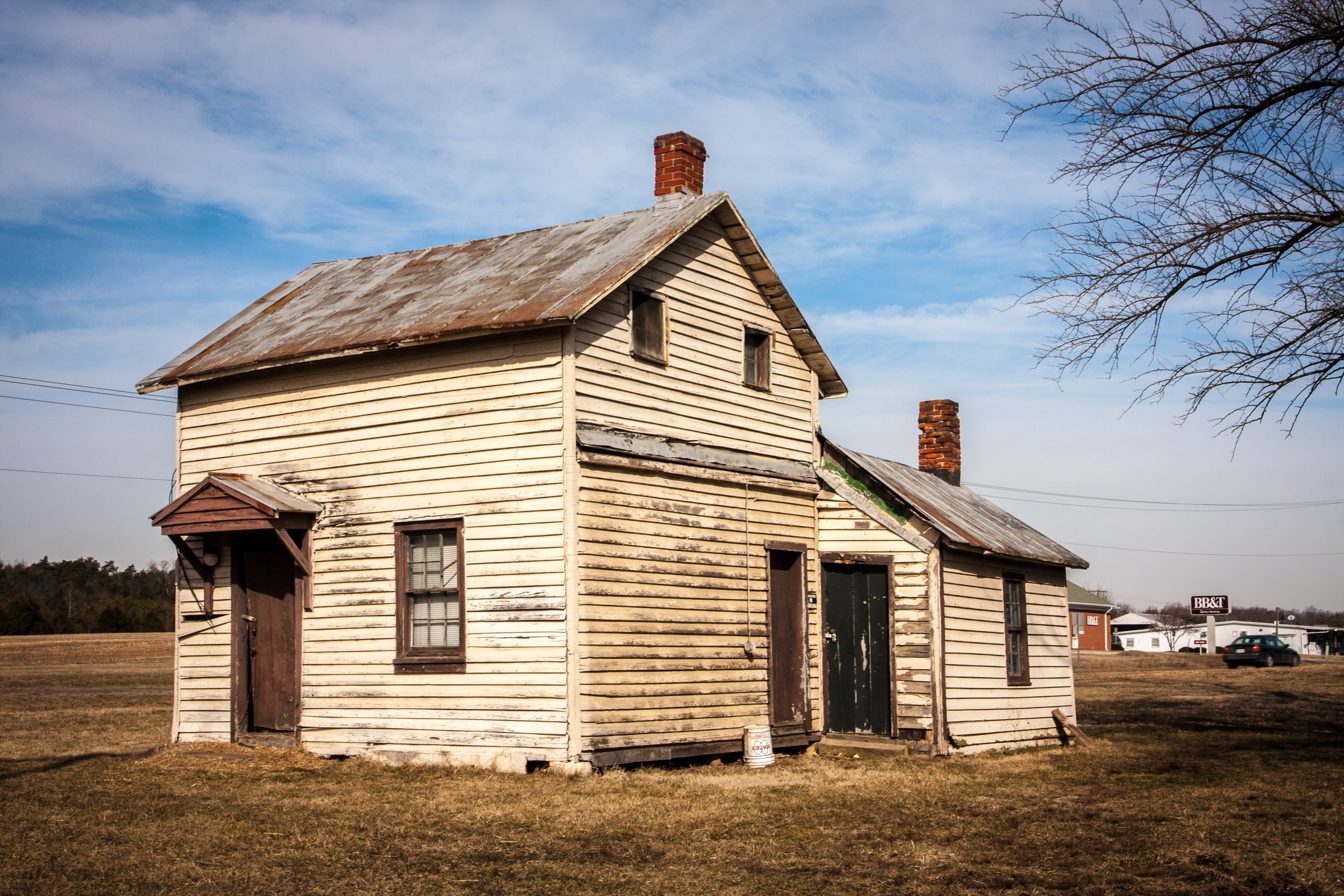
Wood frame dwelling at corner of Gaskins Ln. and Catlett Rd.

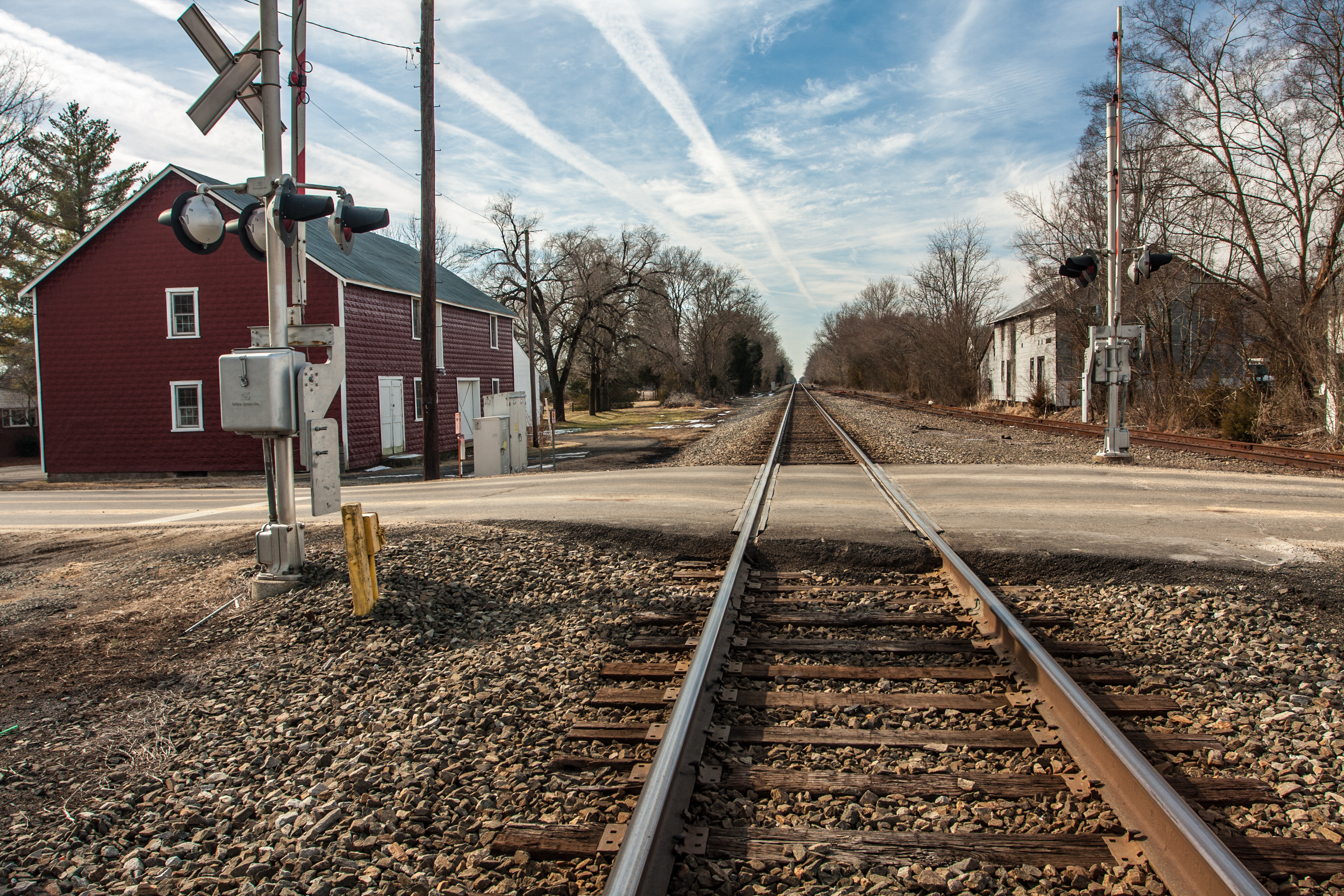
Railroad tracks running through Catlett
