= Harvey M. Munsell =

American soldier

Harvey May Munsell
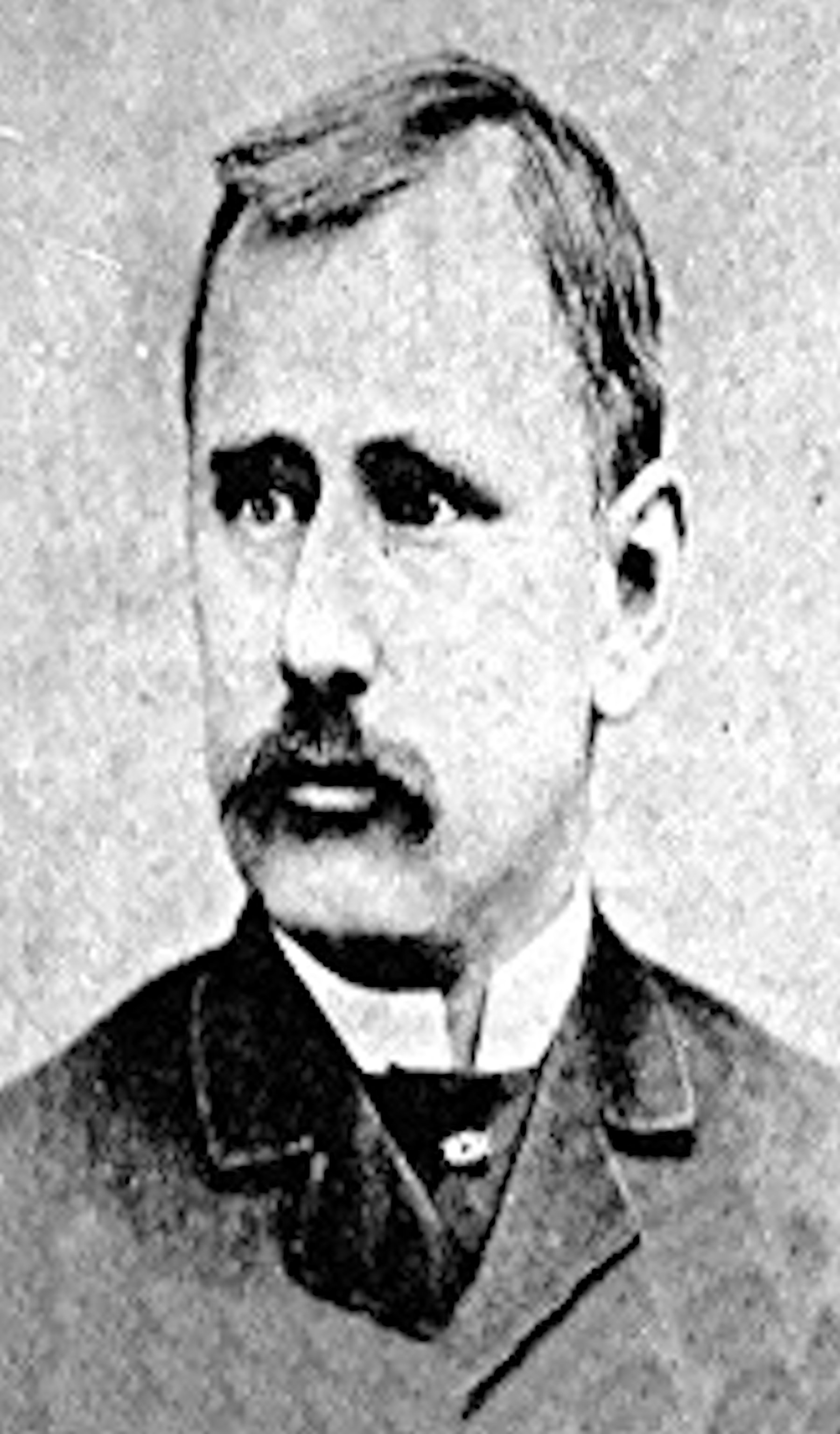
- Born: January 5, 1843; Painted Post, New York
- Died: February 19, 1913 (aged 70); Cambridge, Massachusetts
- Burial place: Mount Auburn Cemetery
- Military career
- Allegiance: United States of America
- Branch: United States Army
- Rank: Sergeant
- Units: Company A, 99th Pennsylvania Infantry
- Conflicts: Battle of Gettysburg; American Civil War
- Awards: Medal of Honor

Harvey May Munsell (January 5, 1843 – February 19, 1913) was an American soldier who fought with the Union Army in the American Civil War. Munsell received his country's highest award for bravery during combat, the Medal of Honor, for actions taken over the course of 13 engagements from July 1–3, 1863 during the Battle of Gettysburg.

== Civil War service ==
Munsell enlisted with the 32nd Pennsylvania (later renumbered the 99th) in Philadelphia at age 18. He had been managing a lumberyard for his uncle in Oil City, Pennsylvania at the time the Civil War began, and enlisted in the Union Army due to his opposition to slavery. Due to his short stature, and reported to be only 100 pounds, Munsell was turned away at all enlistment sites along the way from Oil City until he reached Philadelphia, where there was such a high demand for volunteers that his small size was overlooked. He was enlisted as a private, and was made color-bearer.

Munsell first saw action during the Peninsula campaign, where he charged a Georgian line with his flag encouraging his men to follow and drive back the Confederate advance. His next battle was the Battle of Chancellorsville from May 2–3, 1863. During this battle, Munsell and his unit were tasked with clearing from the woods a group of Confederate soldiers for which they received the Kearny Cross.

Munsell was next at the Battle of Gettysburg, the 99th situated at the Devil's Den on the left flank of General Ward's brigade. During the ensuing battle, Munsell misunderstood commands to fall back with his company and found himself exposed to Confederate fire. A cannon shell burst nearby causing him to hit the ground and fall into a cavity made by a previous shell explosion. Here, he remained until the Sixth Corps pushed back the Confederate advance and he was able to return to his unit. Following this action, Major John W. Moore, commander of the 99th, made a special note of Munsell's actions, calling it "worthy of the most decided approval". Further commendations were sent to the Secretary of War by General J. H. Hobart Ward.

Following Gettysburg, Munsell took part in the Battle of Kelly's Ford, the Battle of Mine Run, and the Battle of Manassas Gap. He then received an extended furlough to attend the Free Military School in Washington, D.C., where he left as a First Lieutenant. He then rejoined his regiment and took part in the Battle of Cold Harbor, the Siege of Petersburg, and the Second Battle of Deep Bottom. In the latter fight, Munsell was captured and held as a prisoner of war until his release in 1865. He returned to his company yet again, now as a captain.

== Medal of Honor citation ==
The President of the United States of America, in the name of Congress, takes pleasure in presenting the Medal of Honor to Sergeant Harvey May Munsell, United States Army, for extraordinary heroism on July 1–3, 1863, while serving with Company A, 99th Pennsylvania Infantry, in action at Gettysburg, Pennsylvania, for gallant and courageous conduct as Color Bearer. Sergeant Munsell carried the colors of his regiment through 13 engagements.
