= Auburn Battlefield =

- U.S. National Register of Historic Places
- U.S. Historic district
- Virginia Landmarks Register
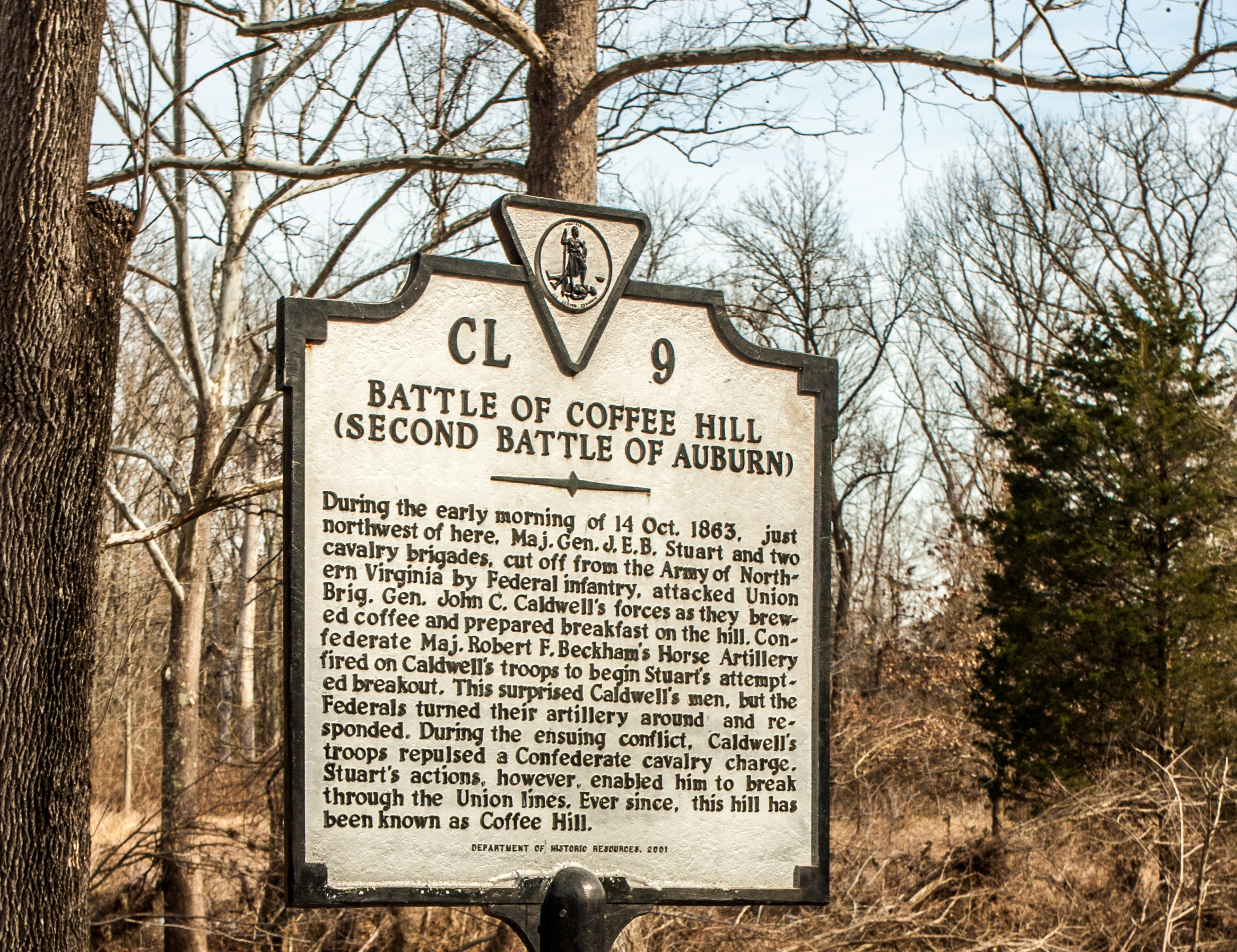
- Auburn Battlefield marker, February 2014

- Location within Northern Virginia Location within Virginia Location within the United States
- Location: Bounded by Casanova, Auburn Baptist Church, & Catlett, near Catlett, Virginia
- Coordinates: 38°37′35″N 77°40′14″W
- Area: 3,483 acres (1,410 ha)
- Built: 1863
- MPS: Civil War in Virginia MPS
- NRHP reference No.: 11000873
- VLR No.: 030-5140

Significant dates
- Added to NRHP: December 5, 2011
- Designated VLR: June 16, 2011

Auburn Battlefield, also known as Coffee Hill Battlefield, is a national historic district and American Civil War battlefield located near Catlett, Fauquier County, Virginia. It encompasses the areas of the two Auburn battles on October 13 and 14, 1863, and includes 18 contributing buildings, 23 contributing sites, and 8 contributing structures. The battles are referred to as the First Battle of Auburn and Second Battle of Auburn.

It was listed on the National Register of Historic Places in 2011.

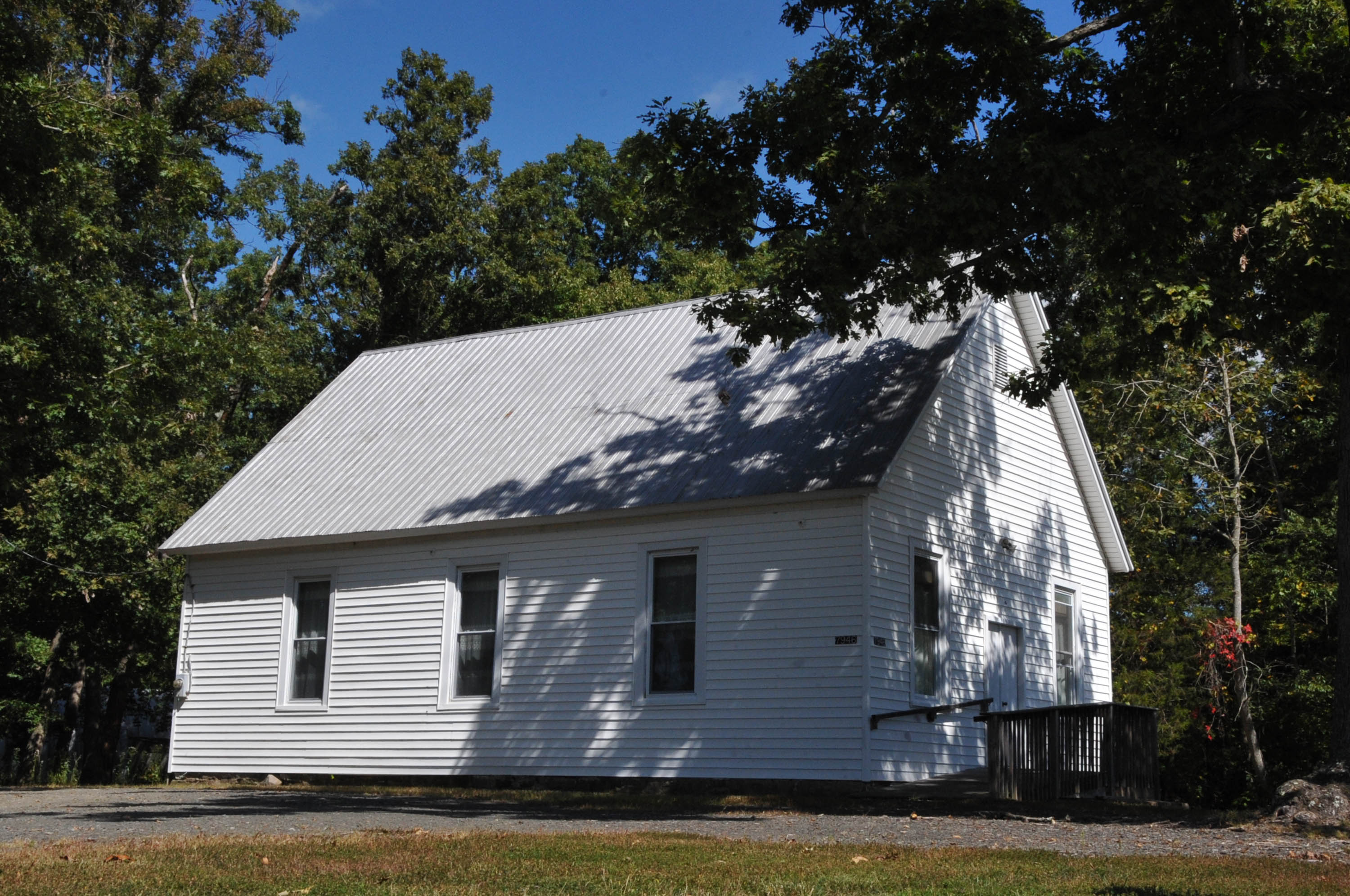
Old church near the battlefield
