= Charles Henry Fasnacht =

American soldier who fought in the American Civil War

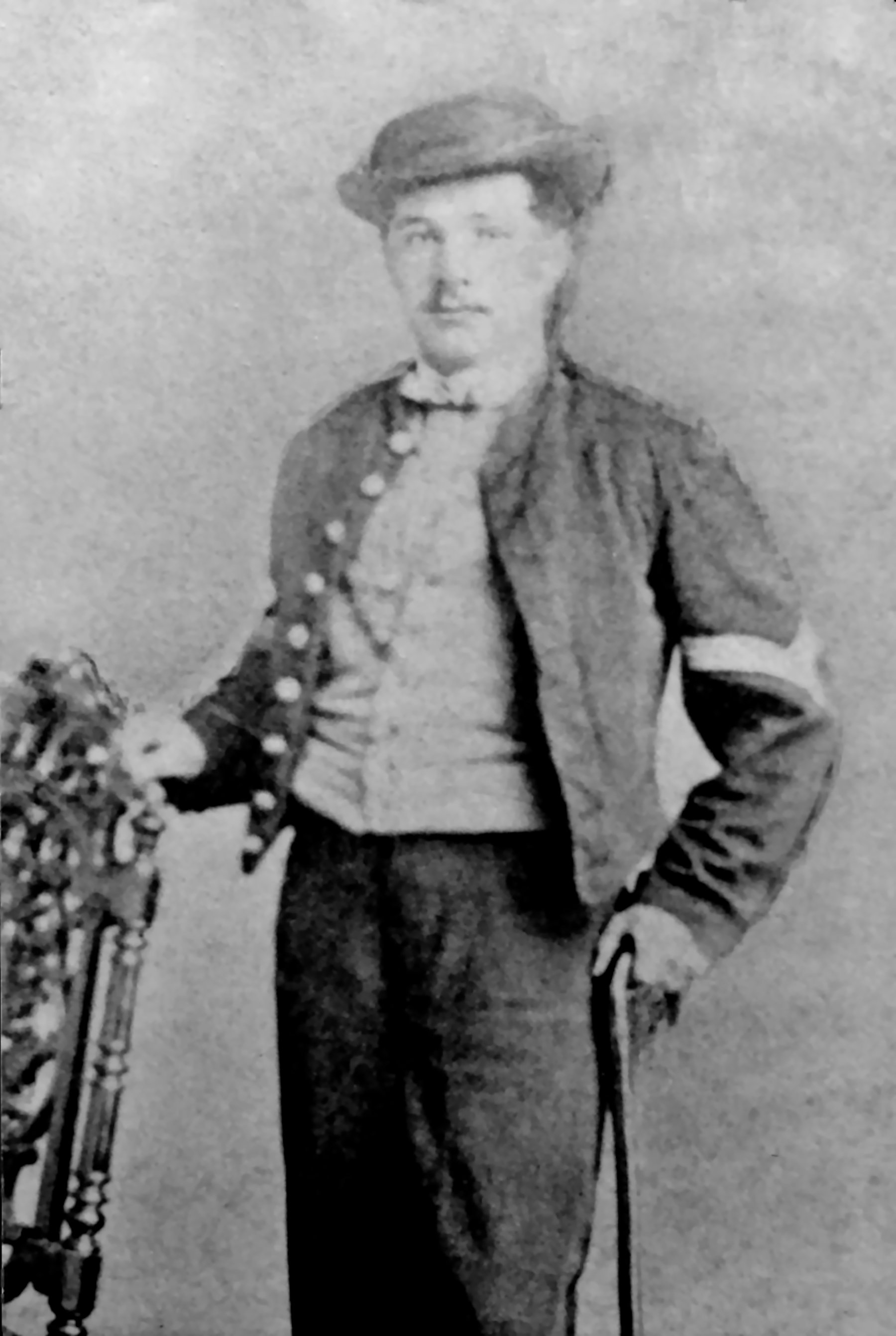
- Medal of Honor recipient Charles Henry Fasnacht c1864
- Born: March 27, 1842; Lancaster County, Pennsylvania
- Died: July 21, 1902 (aged 60)
- Burial place: Greenwood Cemetery
- Military career
- Allegiance: United States of America
- Branch: United States Army; Union Army
- Rank: Sergeant
- Units: Company A, 99th Pennsylvania Infantry
- Conflicts: Battle of Spotsylvania Court House; Battle of Fredericksburg
- Awards: Medal of Honor

Sergeant Charles Henry Fasnacht (born Karl Heinrich Fasnacht; March 27, 1842 – July 21, 1902) was an American soldier who fought in the American Civil War. Fasnacht received the country's highest award for bravery during combat, the Medal of Honor, for his action during the Battle of Spotsylvania Court House in Virginia on 12 May 1864. He was honored with the award on 2 April 1878.

== Biography ==
Fasnacht was born in Lancaster County, Pennsylvania on 27 March 1842.

After the start of the Civil War, Fasnacht enlisted in the 99th Pennsylvania Infantry. After performing the act of gallantry earned him the Medal of Honor on 12 May 1864 during the Battle of Spotsylvania Court House, he was captured by the Confederates, after being wounded on the battlefield. Having hid the captured flag under his shirt, he was later rescued by Union troops while being transferred to Richmond, Virginia. Fasnacht continued to fight in the war until he was mustered out on 1 July 1865.

He died on 21 July 1902 and his remains are interred at the Greenwood Cemetery in Pennsylvania.

== Medal of Honor citation ==
The President of the United States of America, in the name of Congress, takes pleasure in presenting the Medal of Honor to Sergeant Charles H. Fasnacht, United States Army, for extraordinary heroism on 12 May 1864, while serving with Company A, 99th Pennsylvania Infantry, in action at Spotsylvania, Virginia, for capture of flag of 2d Louisiana Tigers (Confederate States of America) in a hand-to-hand contest.

== See also ==
- List of American Civil War Medal of Honor recipients: A–F
