= Raid at Catlett's Station =

Date	August 22, 1862
Location	Catlett, Virginia 38°39′9.96″N 77°38′23.04″W
Result	Confederate Victory

Belligerents
Confederate Cavalry	Union Supply Depot

Commanders and leaders
MG J.E.B. Stuart	Major Charles N. Goulding

Units involved
Stuart's Cavalry	Depot Detachment

Strength
1,500	200-300
- Location within Virginia

The Raid at Catlett's Station, was a cavalry raid in the American Civil War on August 22, 1862 and was part of the Second Manassas Campaign.

== Background ==
On August 21, Major General J.E.B. Stuart, proposed a raid to General Robert E. Lee to go around the flank of Union Major General John Pope's army. The next morning he left camp with 1,500 cavalry troopers in the hopes of burning the bridge on the Orange and Alexandria Railroad line. By the time Stuart arrived, there was a driving rainstorm making it impossible to burn the bridge.

== Raid ==
Instead, Stuart's cavalry captured Pope's headquarters baggage at the supply depot of Cartlett's Station. The depot was lightly guarded by a quartermaster detail. The raid was very successful taking 200 union soldiers prisoner, the Union payroll, a large amount of Union supplies, Gen. Pope's personal baggage, including his dress uniforms, and his dispatch book.

The dispatch book contained plans for Pope's army to join with Major General George McClellan's Army of the Potomac, in addition to unit strengths and movements. The intelligence was useful to Gen. Lee, who used it to help him defeat Pope at the Second Battle of Bull Run, badly damaging the Army of Virginia.

== Raid historical marker ==
There is a Civil War Trails historical marker at the intersection of Elk Run Road (County Route 806) and Fernridge Road in Catlett, Virginia.
