= Bristoe campaign =

1863 military campaign in Virginia during the U.S. Civil War

- Part of the American Civil War
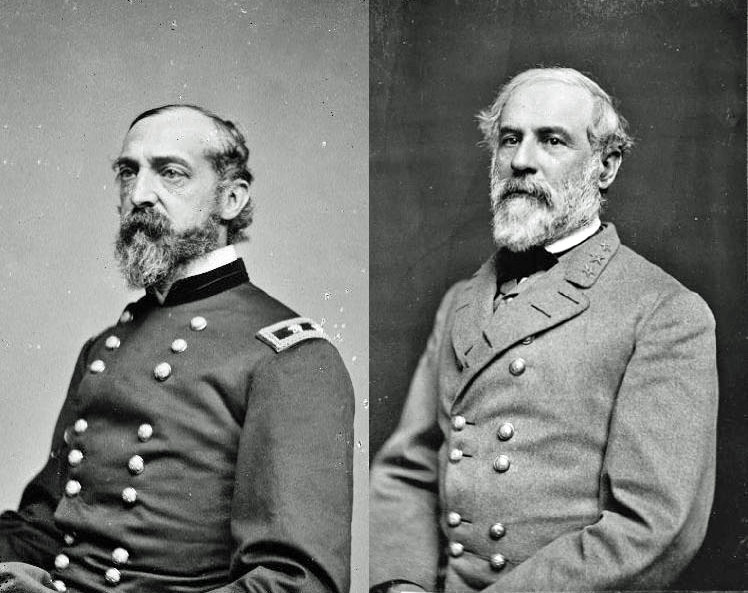
- George G. Meade and Robert E. Lee, commanding generals of the Bristoe campaign
Date	October 13 – November 7, 1863
Location	Virginia
Result	Union victory

Belligerents
United States	Confederate States

Commanders and leaders
(United States) George G. Meade	(Confederate States of America) Robert E. Lee

Units involved
Army of the Potomac	Army of Northern Virginia

Strength
76,000	45,000

Casualties and losses
- 4,815

The Bristoe campaign was a series of minor battles fought in Virginia during October and November 1863, in the American Civil War. Maj. Gen. George G. Meade, commanding the Union Army of the Potomac, began to maneuver in an unsuccessful attempt to defeat Gen. Robert E. Lee's Army of Northern Virginia. Lee countered with a turning movement, which caused Meade to withdraw his army back toward Centreville. Lee struck at Bristoe Station on October 14, but suffered losses in two brigades and withdrew. As Meade followed south once again, the Union army smashed a Confederate defensive bridgehead at Rappahannock Station on November 7 and drove Lee back across the Rapidan River. Along with the infantry battles, the cavalry forces of the armies fought at Auburn on October 13, again at Auburn on October 14, and at Buckland Mills on October 19.

The Confederates had not achieved their primary objectives of bringing on a decisive battle or preventing the Federal reinforcement of the Western Theater, and Lee and his officers were much demoralized by this failure.

== Background ==
After the Battle of Gettysburg in July, Robert E. Lee retreated back across the Potomac River to Virginia and concentrated behind the Rapidan River in Orange County, Virginia. Meade was widely criticized for failing to pursue aggressively and defeat Lee's army. He planned new offensives in Virginia for the fall.

Early in September, Lee dispatched two divisions of Lt. Gen. James Longstreet's Corps to reinforce the Confederate Army of Tennessee for the Battle of Chickamauga. Meade knew that Lee had been weakened by the departure of Longstreet and wanted to take advantage. Meade advanced his army to the Rappahannock River in August, and on September 13 he pushed strong columns forward to confront Lee along the Rapidan, occupying Culpeper, Virginia, following the Battle of Culpeper Court House. Meade planned to use his numerical superiority in a broad turning movement, similar to the one planned by Maj. Gen. Joseph Hooker in the Battle of Chancellorsville that spring. However, on September 24 the Union had to deplete its forces as well, sending the XI and XII Corps to the Chattanooga campaign in Tennessee.

Lee learned of the departing Union corps, and early in October he began an offensive sweep around Cedar Mountain with his remaining two corps, attempting to turn Meade's right flank. Meade, despite having superior numbers, did not wish to give battle in a position that did not offer him the advantage and ordered the Army of the Potomac to withdraw along the line of the Orange and Alexandria Railroad.

== Battles ==
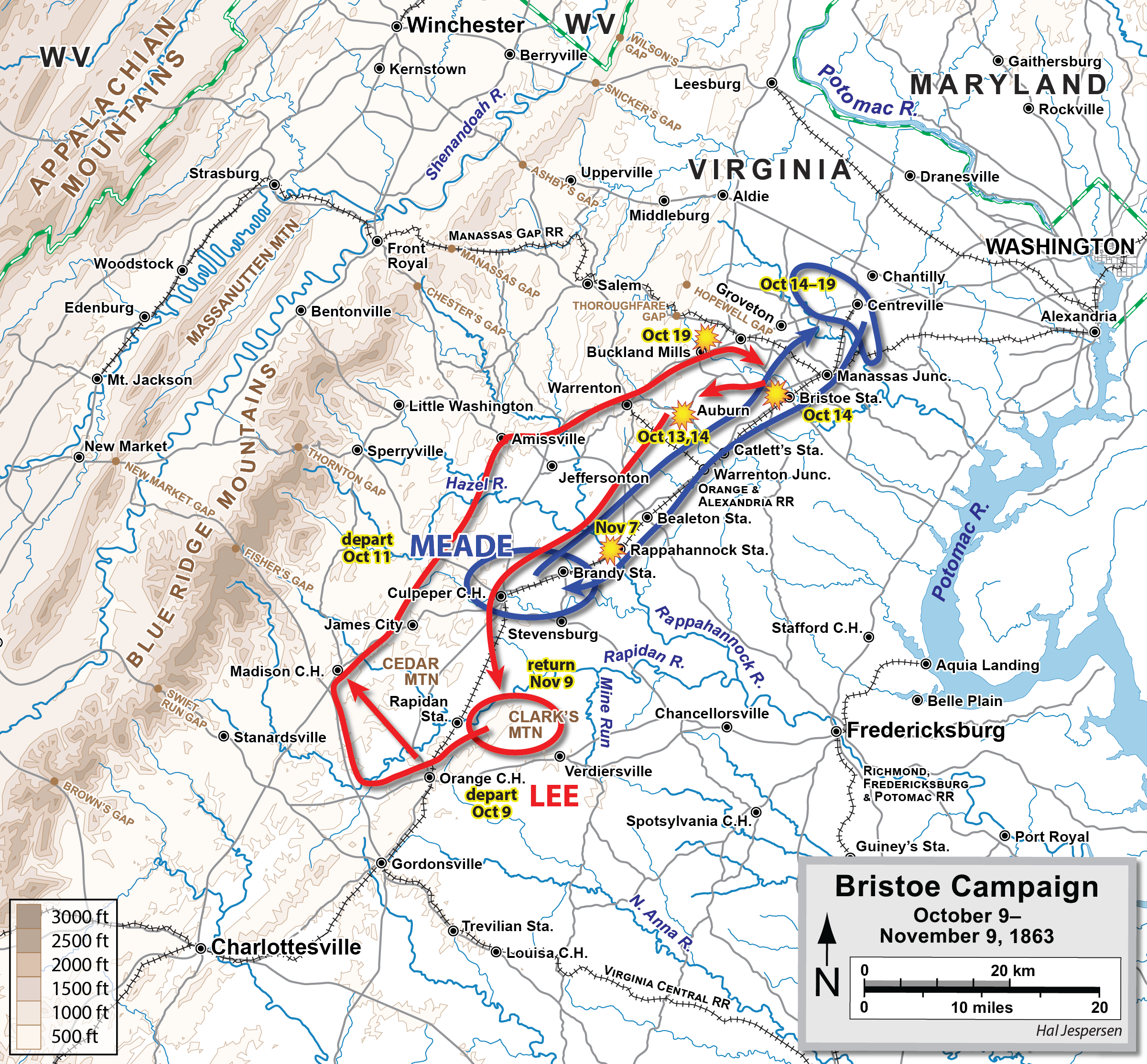
Bristoe campaign Confederate Union

=== Auburn (October 13–14) ===
On October 13, Maj. Gen. J.E.B. Stuart was on one of his typical cavalry raids to capture supply wagons and blundered into the rear guard of the Union III Corps near Warrenton. Lt. Gen. Richard S. Ewell's corps was sent to rescue him, but Stuart hid his troopers in a wooded ravine until the unsuspecting III Corps moved on, and the assistance was not necessary.

As the Union army withdrew towards Manassas Junction, Meade was careful to protect his western flank from the kind of envelopment that had doomed Maj. Gen. John Pope and Hooker in previous battles in this area. Brigades from Maj. Gen. Gouverneur K. Warren's II Corps fought a rearguard action against Stuart's cavalry and the infantry of Brig. Gen. Harry Hays's division near Auburn on October 14. Stuart's cavalry boldly bluffed Warren's infantry and escaped disaster. The II Corps pushed on to Catlett Station on the Orange & Alexandria Railroad.

=== Bristoe Station (October 14) ===
Lt. Gen. A.P. Hill's corps stumbled upon two corps of the retreating Union army at Bristoe Station and attacked without proper reconnaissance. On October 14, Union soldiers of the II Corps, posted behind the Orange & Alexandria Railroad embankment, mauled two brigades of Maj. Gen. Henry Heth's division and captured a battery of artillery. Hill reinforced his line but could make little headway against the determined defenders. After this victory, Meade continued his withdrawal to Centreville unmolested. Lee's Bristoe offensive sputtered to a premature halt. Meade was well entrenched, and Lee had outrun his supplies. After minor skirmishing near Manassas and Centreville, the Confederates retired slowly to the Rappahannock River, destroying the Orange & Alexandria Railroad as they went. Meade was under pressure from general-in-chief Maj. Gen. Henry W. Halleck to pursue Lee, but it took almost a month to re-lay the railroad track behind his army.

=== Buckland Races (October 19) ===
After defeat at Bristoe Station and an aborted advance on Centreville, Stuart's cavalry shielded the withdrawal of Lee's army from the vicinity of Manassas Junction. Union cavalry under Brig. Gen. Judson Kilpatrick pursued Stuart's cavalry along the Warrenton Turnpike but were lured into an ambush near Chestnut Hill and routed. The Federal troopers were scattered and chased five miles (8 km) in an affair that came to be known as the "Buckland Races".

=== Across the Rappahannock (November 7) ===
Lee returned to his old position behind the Rappahannock but left a fortified bridgehead on the north bank, protecting the approach to Kelly's Ford. On November 7, Meade forced passage of the Rappahannock at two places. A surprise attack by Maj. Gen. John Sedgwick's VI Corps at dusk overran the Confederate bridgehead at Rappahannock Station, capturing two brigades (more than 1,600 men) of Maj. Gen. Jubal A. Early's division. Fighting at Kelly's Ford was less severe, but the Confederates retreated, allowing the Federals across in force.

== Aftermath ==
On the verge of going into winter quarters around Culpeper, Lee's army retired instead into Orange County, south of the Rapidan. The Army of the Potomac occupied the vicinity of Brandy Station and Culpeper County.

The five battles in the Bristoe campaign resulted in 4,815 casualties on both sides, including 1,973 Confederate prisoners at Rappahannock Station. Lee and his officers were disgusted with their lack of success. They had not achieved their primary objectives of bringing on a decisive battle or preventing the Federal reinforcement of the Western Theater. Meade's army was in a good position, sitting on their supply base and having suffered fewer casualties in their larger force. Pressured by Abraham Lincoln to achieve an offensive success against Lee before the winter brought campaigning to a halt, Meade began to plan his Mine Run campaign for later in November.
