= Second Battle of Auburn =

Battle of the American Civil War

- Part of the American Civil War
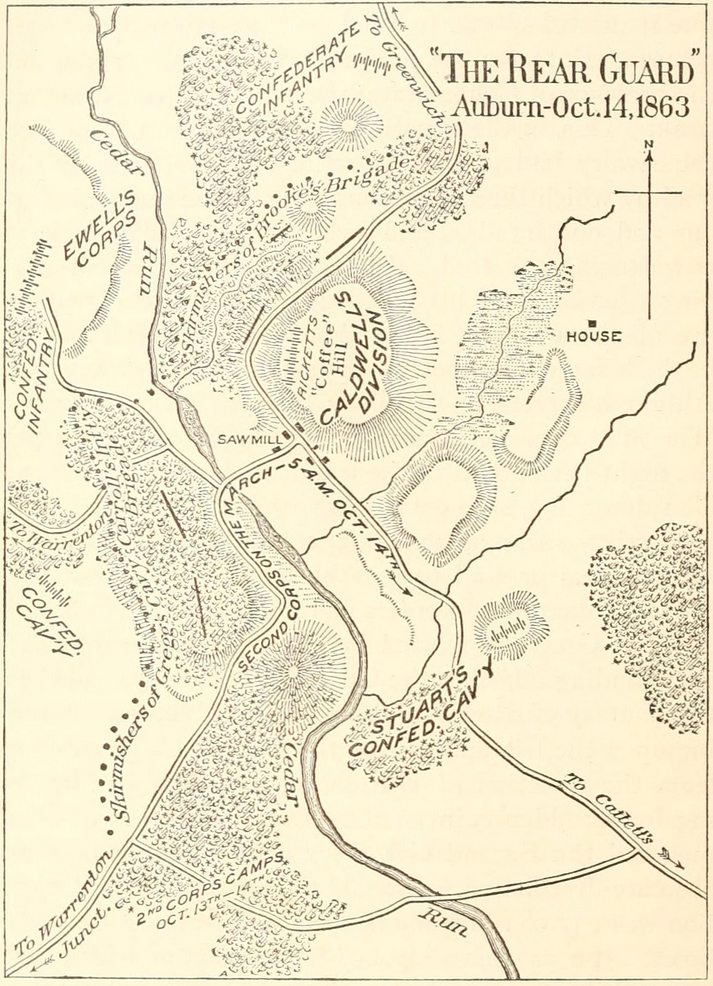
- Map of the battle (1886)
Date	October 14, 1863
Location	Fauquier County, Virginia 38.702°N 77.702°W
Result	Inconclusive

Belligerents
United States of America	Confederate States of America

Commanders and leaders
Gouverneur K. Warren	J.E.B. Stuart

Strength
Unknown	3,000

Casualties and losses
- 113
- Location of the battle in Virginia Second Battle of Auburn (the United States)

The Second Battle of Auburn was fought on October 14, 1863, in Fauquier County, Virginia, between Union and Confederate forces in the American Civil War. Confederate forces led by Lt. Gen. Richard S. Ewell led a sortie to extricate Maj. Gen. J.E.B. Stuart's cavalry command, trapped between two Union columns and clashed with the rearguard of the Federal II Corps under Brig. Gen. Gouverneur K. Warren. Stuart was successfully extricated but the Federal wagon train avoided Confederate capture in the inconclusive fight.

== Background ==
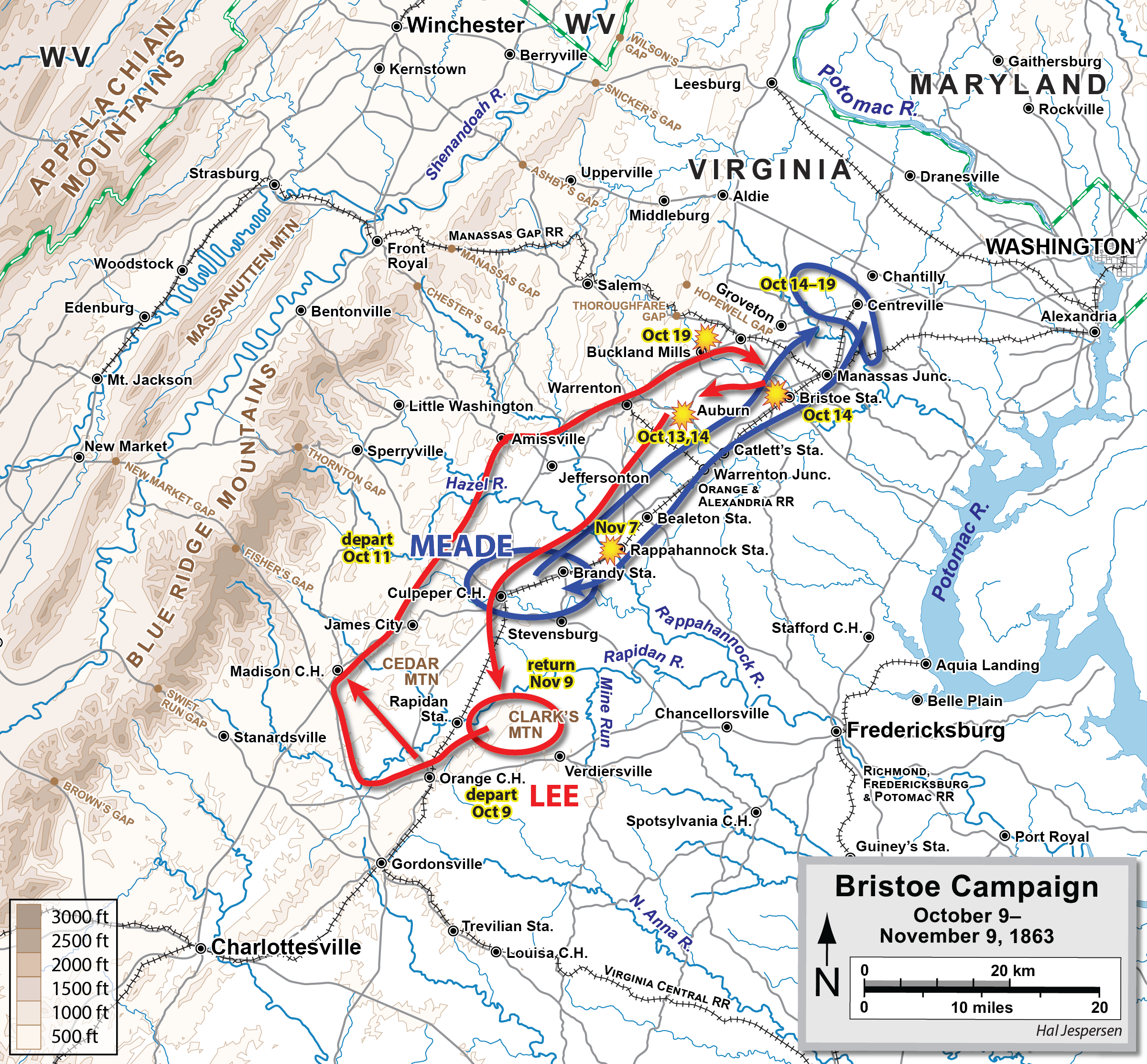
Bristoe Campaign Confederate Union

On October 10, 1863, Gen. Robert E. Lee went on the offensive for the first time since the Gettysburg campaign in an attempt to turn the right flank of the Army of the Potomac standing between his Army of Northern Virginia and Washington, D.C., much as he had done the year prior during the Northern Virginia Campaign. As Lee began his advance, Maj. Gen. George G. Meade shifted his line from the north bank of the Rapidan River towards Centreville to avoid being flanked. On October 13, J.E.B. Stuart was dispatched from Warrenton towards Catlett's Station on the Orange and Alexandria Railroad to determine the location of the Union left flank.

Upon discovering the Union wagon train falling back up the railroad, Stuart determined to raid it, leaving a small detachment in his rear at Auburn. Poor scouting failed to locate the presence of a Federal column of the II and III Corps advancing on Auburn from the south. The Federal column, whose cavalry had been dispatched towards Warrenton to protect the Union left flank, stumbled into Stuart's rearguard and a small fight ensued, known as the First Battle of Auburn. The small Confederate force was quickly driven off by the superior Union force and the Federal II Corps under Brig. Gen. Gouverneur K. Warren went in to bivouac just south of Auburn, trapping Stuart's force between it and the wagon train. Stuart led his force, some 3,000 men, horses and equipment into a wooded ravine and hid from the Federals overnight. During the night Stuart dispatched a half dozen scouts in Federal uniforms through the Union lines to alert Lee, who dispatched Richard S. Ewell's Corps to Auburn to extricate Stuart at dawn the next morning.

At 3 a.m. on October 14, Warren's II Corps broke camp at Three Mile Station for Catlett's Station. At the crossing of Cedar Run just south of Auburn the ground was muddied by the passing of the Federal III Corps during the night. The wagon trains had difficulty in the mud on the slopes of the creek and accordingly Warren ordered Brig. Gen John C. Caldwell's brigade to secure the high ground north of the creek and guard the rear of the column and the wagon train as it marched to Catlett's Station. On the hill, Caldwell's men set up camp and began to make breakfast, and the Hill was soon dubbed Coffee Hill. Caldwell formed a skirmish line facing northwest towards Warrenton with the 10th New York in advance as vedettes.

== Battle ==
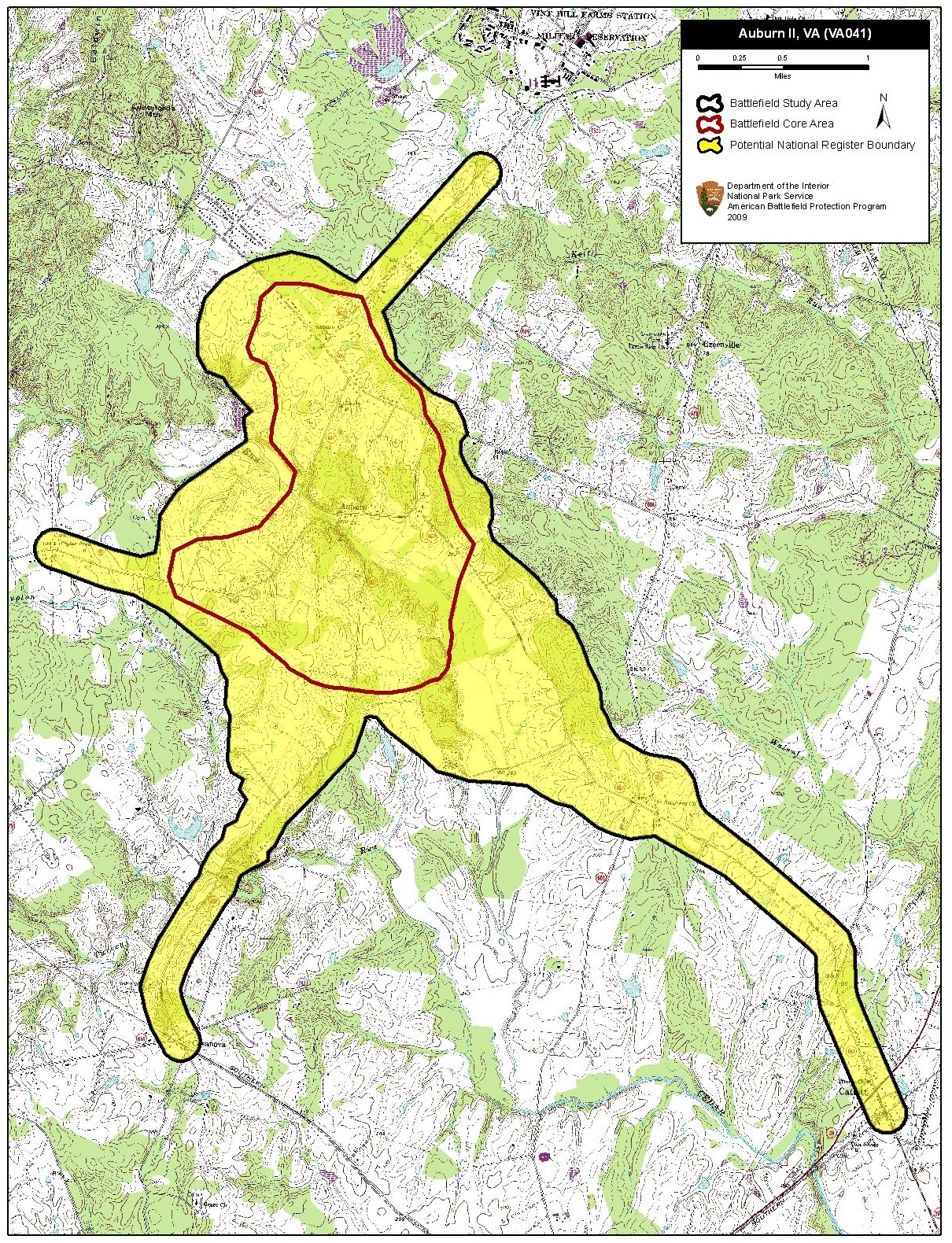
Map of Auburn II Battlefield core and study areas by the American Battlefield Protection Program.

At 6:15 a.m. the advance of Ewell's Corps under Maj. Gen. Robert E. Rodes's division approached the 10th New York and skirmishing broke out. The sound of gunfire carried to the ravine where Stuart was holed up and he dispatched scouts to reconnoiter the situation. Upon discovering the Federals on Coffee Hill, Stuart ordered Maj. Robert Beckham's Horse Artillery on a hill to the east of Coffee Hill. The Confederates opened a barrage on the Federals, catching them by surprise. Caldwell turned his batteries on Coffee Hill to face Beckham's, moved his line to the western slope of the hill protecting them against the artillery fire and then dispatched Brig. Gen. Alexander Hays's division against Beckham.

To protect Beckham as he limbered his guns to withdrawal, Stuart sent Brig. Gen. James B. Gordon to charge the Federal advance being led by the 125th New York. The charge temporarily stopped the advance and general skirmishing between the sides ensued. Stuart ordered Gordon to charge again to provide cover for his cavalry to escape to the southeast. Gordon fell wounded in the charge but Stuart made his escape and looped around the Federal position, joining with Maj. Gen. Jubal A. Early and Brig. Gen. Fitzhugh Lee posted to the southwest of Auburn.

With Stuart's command gone, the battle intensified along Ewell's front. Rodes advanced on Coffee Hill and Caldwell repositioned his artillery back to the west to check the Confederate advance. Rodes pressed the attack from 8 to 9 a.m. with Early and Fitzhugh Lee's divisions joining the fray from the southwest. By 10 a.m. the fight had stalled and an hour-long artillery duel ensued until the Federal column had passed safely to Catlett's Station. Caldwell withdrew to the east pressed for a short time by Rodes. By 1 p.m. all fighting had ceased and Ewell withdrew.

== Aftermath ==
The morning-long fight resulted in just over 100 total casualties. Strategically the result was a draw. The Confederates were able to save Stuart's command from near certain capture while the Federals were able to protect their vulnerable wagon trains. Determined to press the rear of the Union retrograde, Robert E. Lee ordered Lt. Gen. A.P. Hill to pursue the Federals east along the railroad, resulting in the Battle of Bristoe Station later that afternoon.

== See also ==
- Auburn Battlefield
