= John Pope (general) =

United States Army general (1822–1892)

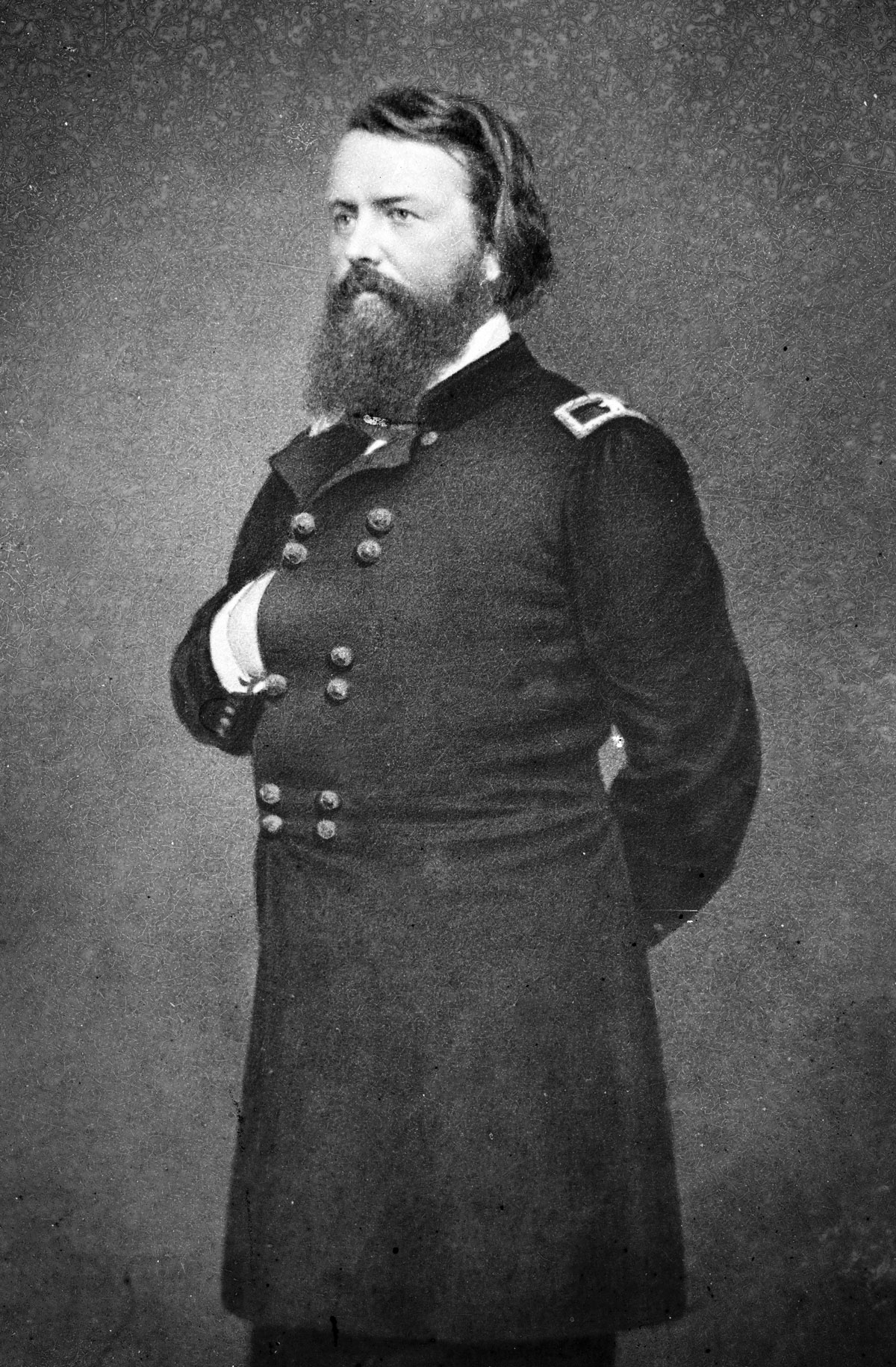
- Brig. Gen. John Pope
- Born: March 16, 1822; Louisville, Kentucky, U.S.
- Died: September 23, 1892 (aged 70); Ohio Soldiers and Sailors Home near Sandusky, Ohio, U.S.
- Burial place: Bellefontaine Cemetery; St. Louis, Missouri
- Military career
- Allegiance: United States
- Branch: United States Army
- Service years: 1842–1886
- Rank: Major General
- Commands: Army of the Mississippi; Army of Virginia; Department of the Northwest; Department of the Missouri; Military Division of the Pacific
- Conflicts: Second Seminole War; Mexican–American War; Battle of Monterrey; Battle of Buena Vista; American Civil War; Battle of Island Number Ten; First Battle of Rappahannock Station; Second Battle of Bull Run; Dakota War of 1862; Apache Wars

John Pope (March 16, 1822 – September 23, 1892) was a career United States Army officer and Union general in the American Civil War. He had a brief successful stint in the Western Theater, but he is best known for his defeat at the Second Battle of Bull Run (Second Manassas) in the East.

John Pope was a graduate of the United States Military Academy in 1842. He served in the Mexican–American War and had numerous assignments as a topographical engineer and surveyor in Florida, New Mexico, and Minnesota. He spent much of the last decade before the Civil War surveying possible southern routes for the proposed first transcontinental railroad. He was an early appointee as a Union brigadier general of volunteers and served initially under Maj. Gen. John C. Frémont. He achieved initial success against Brig. Gen. Sterling Price in Missouri, then led a successful campaign that captured Island No. 10 on the Mississippi River. This inspired the Lincoln administration to bring him to the Eastern Theater to lead the newly formed Army of Virginia.

He initially alienated many of his officers and men by publicly denigrating their record in comparison to his Western command. He launched an offensive against the Confederate army of General Robert E. Lee, in which he fell prey to a strategic turning movement into his rear areas by Maj. Gen. Stonewall Jackson. At Second Bull Run, he concentrated his attention on attacking Jackson while the other Confederate corps led by Maj. Gen. James Longstreet attacked his flank and routed his army.

Following Manassas, Pope was banished far from the Eastern Theater to the Department of the Northwest in Minnesota, where he commanded U.S. Forces in the Dakota War of 1862. He was appointed to command the Department of the Missouri in 1865 and was a prominent and activist commander during Reconstruction in Atlanta. For the rest of his military career, he fought in the Indian Wars, particularly against the Apache and Sioux.

== Early life ==
Pope was born in Louisville, Kentucky, the son of Nathaniel Pope, a prominent Federal judge in early Illinois Territory and a friend of lawyer Abraham Lincoln. He was the brother-in-law of Manning Force, and a distant cousin married the sister of Mary Todd Lincoln. He graduated from the United States Military Academy, 17th in a class of 56, in 1842, and was commissioned a brevet second lieutenant in the Corps of Topographical Engineers.

Pope served in Florida and then helped survey the northeastern border between the United States and Canada. He fought under Zachary Taylor in the Battle of Monterrey and Battle of Buena Vista during the Mexican–American War, for which he was appointed a brevet first lieutenant and captain, respectively. After the war Pope worked as a surveyor in Minnesota. In 1850 he demonstrated the navigability of the Red River. He served as the chief engineer of the Department of New Mexico from 1851 to 1853 and spent the remainder of the years preceding the Civil War surveying a route for the Pacific Railroad.

Pope was the author of various works and papers, including railway reports (Pacific Railroad Reports vol. iii.).

== Civil War ==
Pope was serving on lighthouse duty when Abraham Lincoln was elected and he was one of four officers selected to escort the president-elect to Washington, D.C. He offered to serve Lincoln as an aide, but on June 14, 1861, he was appointed brigadier general of volunteers (date of rank effective May 17, 1861) and was ordered to Illinois to recruit volunteers.

In the Department of the West under Maj. Gen. John C. Frémont, Pope assumed command of the District of North and Central Missouri in July, with operational control along a portion of the Mississippi River. He had an uncomfortable relationship with Frémont and politicked behind the scenes to get him removed from command. Frémont was convinced that Pope had treacherous intentions toward him, demonstrated by his lack of action in following Frémont's offensive plans in Missouri. Historian Allan Nevins wrote, "Actually, incompetence and timidity offer a better explanation of Pope than treachery, though he certainly showed an insubordinate spirit."

Pope eventually forced the Confederates under Sterling Price to retreat southward, taking 1,200 prisoners in a minor action at Blackwater, Missouri, on December 18. Pope, who established a reputation as a braggart early in the war, was able to generate significant press interest in his minor victory, which brought him to the attention of Frémont's replacement, Maj. Gen. Henry W. Halleck.

Halleck appointed Pope to command the Army of the Mississippi (and the District of the Mississippi, Department of the Missouri) on February 23, 1862. Given 25,000 men, he was ordered to clear Confederate obstacles on the Mississippi River. He made a surprise march on New Madrid, Missouri, and captured it on March 14. He then orchestrated a campaign to capture Island No. 10, a strongly fortified post garrisoned by 12,000 men and 58 guns. Pope's engineers cut a channel that allowed him to bypass the island. Assisted by the gunboats of Captain Andrew H. Foote, he landed his men on the opposite shore, which isolated the defenders. The island garrison surrendered on April 7, 1862, freeing Union navigation of the Mississippi as far south as Memphis.

Pope's outstanding performance on the Mississippi earned him a promotion to major general, dated as of March 21, 1862. During the Siege of Corinth, he commanded the left wing of Halleck's army, but he was soon summoned to the East by Lincoln. After the collapse of Maj. Gen. George B. McClellan's Peninsula Campaign, Pope was appointed to command the Army of Virginia, assembled from scattered forces in the Shenandoah Valley and Northern Virginia. This promotion infuriated Frémont, who resigned his commission.

Pope brought an attitude of self-assurance that was offensive to the eastern soldiers under his command. He issued an astonishing message to his new army on July 14, 1862, that included the following:

Let us understand each other. I have come to you from the West, where we have always seen the backs of our enemies; from an army whose business it has been to seek the adversary and to beat him when he was found; whose policy has been attack and not defense. In but one instance has the enemy been able to place our Western armies in defensive attitude. I presume that I have been called here to pursue the same system and to lead you against the enemy. It is my purpose to do so, and that speedily. I am sure you long for an opportunity to win the distinction you are capable of achieving. That opportunity I shall endeavor to give you. Meantime I desire you to dismiss from your minds certain phrases, which I am sorry to find so much in vogue amongst you. I hear constantly of "taking strong positions and holding them," of "lines of retreat," and of "bases of supplies." Let us discard such ideas. The strongest position a soldier should desire to occupy is one from which he can most easily advance against the enemy. Let us study the probable lines of retreat of our opponents, and leave our own to take care of themselves. Let us look before us, and not behind. Success and glory are in the advance, disaster and shame lurk in the rear. Let us act on this understanding, and it is safe to predict that your banners shall be inscribed with many a glorious deed and that your names will be dear to your countrymen forever.

— John Pope, message to the Army of Virginia

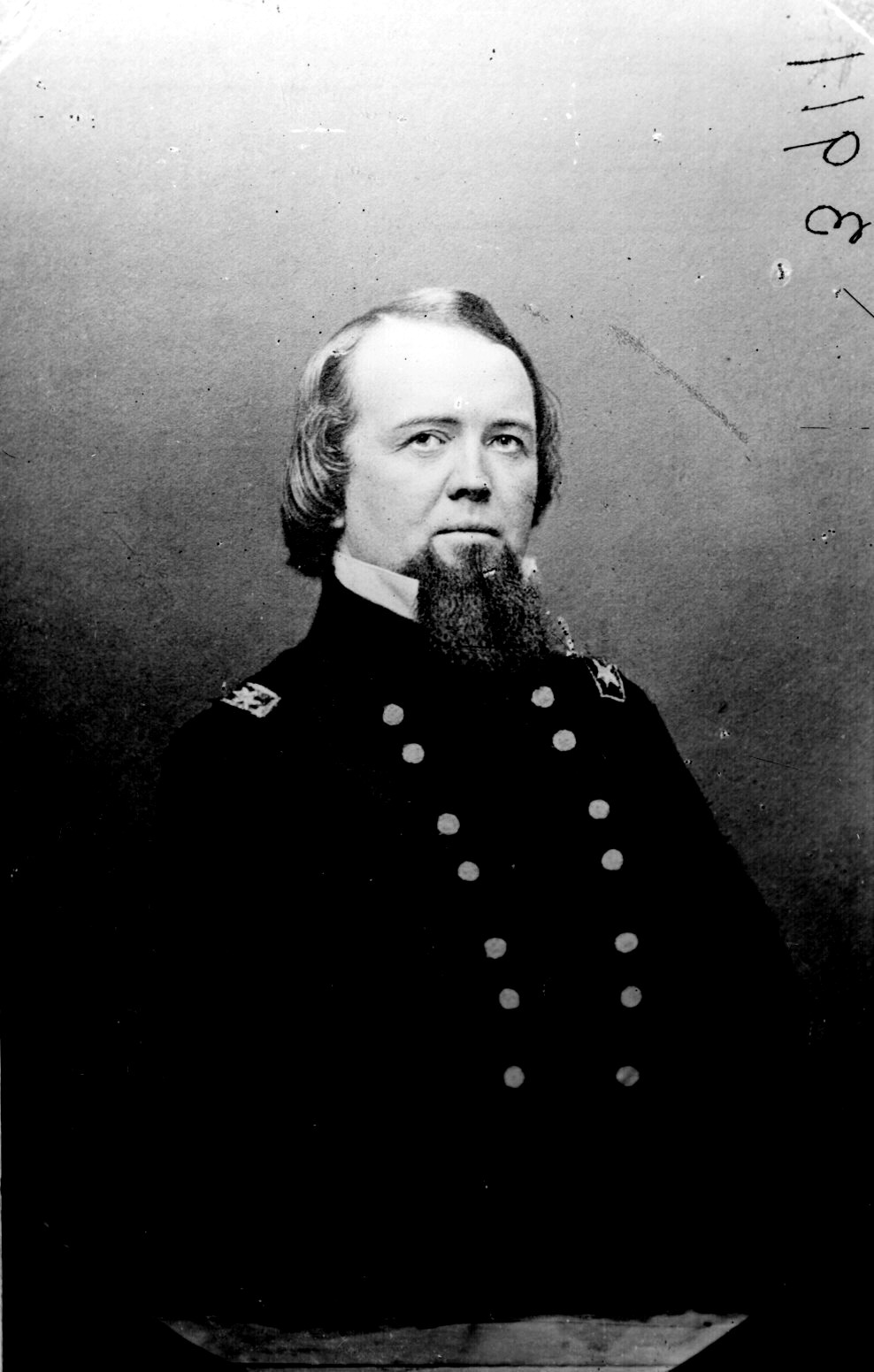
Major General John Pope

Despite this bravado, and despite receiving units from McClellan's Army of the Potomac that swelled the Army of Virginia to 70,000 men, Pope's aggressiveness exceeded his strategic capabilities, particularly since he was now facing Confederate General Robert E. Lee. Lee, sensing that Pope was indecisive, split his smaller (55,000-man) army, sending Maj. Gen. Thomas J. "Stonewall" Jackson with 24,000 men as a diversion to Cedar Mountain, where Jackson defeated Pope's subordinate, Nathaniel Banks.

On August 22, 1862, Pope's headquarters depot at Catlett's Station was captured and looted by Confederate cavalry general J.E.B. Stuart. His raid took more than prisoners, payroll and supplies - they captured Pope's personal baggage including his dispatch book containing all his plans, unit strengths and troop movements. This intelligence would help Gen. Lee in the coming battle.

As Lee advanced on Pope with the remainder of his army, Jackson swung around to the north and captured Pope's main supply base at Manassas Station. Confused and unable to locate the main Confederate force, Pope walked into a trap in the Second Battle of Bull Run. His men attacked Jackson's corps on August 29, 1862, but on the following day, reluctantly obeying Pope's orders, Maj. Gen. Fitz John Porter swung to attack Jackson, exposing his (and by extension the whole Union army's) flank. Maj. Gen. James Longstreet launched a surprise flanking attack, and the Union Army was soundly defeated and forced to retreat. Pope compounded his unpopularity with the Army by blaming his defeat on disobedience by Maj. Gen. Porter, who was found guilty by court-martial and disgraced.

Brigadier General Alpheus S. Williams, who served briefly under Pope, held the general in particularly low esteem. In a letter to his daughter, he wrote:

All this is the sequence of Gen. Pope's high sounding manifestoes. His pompous orders ... greatly disgusted his army from the first. When a general boasts that he will look only on the backs of his enemies, that he takes no care for lines of retreat or bases of supplies; when, in short, from a snug hotel in Washington he issues after-dinner orders to gratify public taste and his own self-esteem, anyone may confidently look for results such as have followed the bungling management of his last campaign ... I dare not trust myself to speak of this commander as I feel and believe. Suffice it to say (for your eye alone) that more insolence, superciliousness, ignorance, and pretentiousness were never combined in one man. It can with truth be said of him that he had not a friend in his command from the smallest drummer boy to the highest general officer. All hated him.

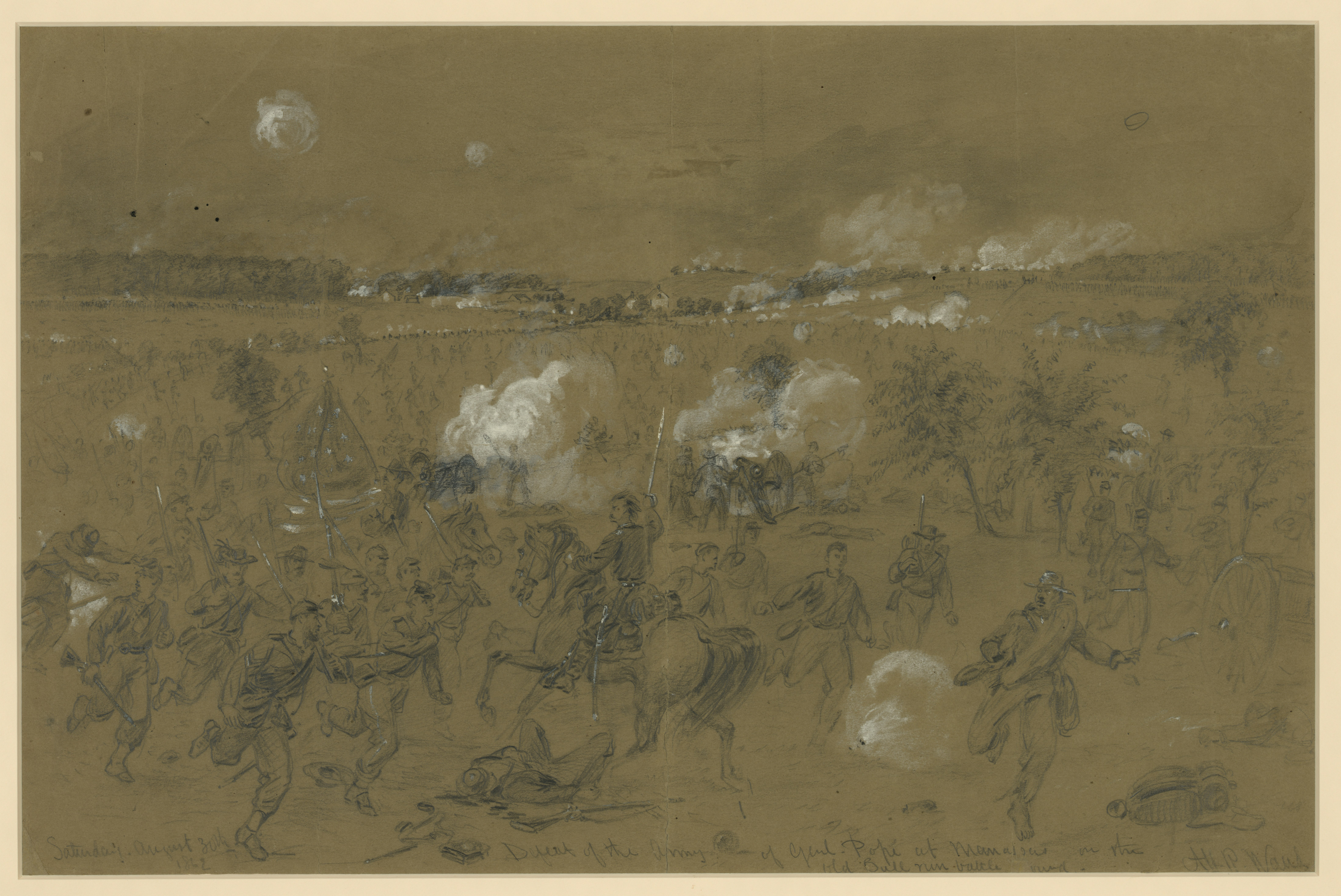
Defeat of Pope's army in the Second Battle of Bull Run, by Alfred Waud

Pope himself was relieved of command on September 12, 1862, and his army was merged into the Army of the Potomac under McClellan. He spent the remainder of the war in the Department of the Northwest in Minnesota, dealing with the Dakota War of 1862. His months campaigning in the West paid career dividends because he was assigned to command the Military Division of the Missouri on January 30, 1865, and received a brevet promotion to major general in the regular army on March 13, 1865, for his service at Island No. 10. Pope authored The Campaign of Virginia (Washington, 1865).

== Postwar years ==
In April 1867, Pope was named governor of the Reconstruction Third Military District and made his headquarters in Atlanta, issuing orders that allowed African Americans to serve on juries, ordering Mayor James Williams to remain in office another year, postponing elections, and banning city advertising in newspapers that did not favor Reconstruction. President Andrew Johnson removed him from command December 28, 1867, replacing him with George G. Meade. Following this, Pope was appointed head of the Department of the Lakes (based in Detroit, Michigan) from January 13, 1868, to April 30, 1870.

Pope returned to the West as commander of the Department of the Missouri (the nation's second-largest geographical command) during the Grant presidency, and held that command through 1883. He served with distinction in the Apache Wars, including the Red River War relocating Southern Plains tribes to reservations in Oklahoma. General Pope made political enemies in Washington when he recommended that the reservation system would be better administered by the military than the corrupt Indian Bureau. He also engendered controversy by calling for better and more humane treatment of Native Americans, but author Walter Donald Kennedy notes that he also said "It is my purpose to utterly exterminate the Sioux" and planned to make a "final settlement with all these Indians".

Pope's reputation suffered a serious blow in 1879 when a late-convened Board of Inquiry called by President Rutherford B. Hayes and led by Maj. Gen. John Schofield (Pope's immediate predecessor in the Department of the Missouri and then head of the Department of the Pacific) concluded that Major General Fitz John Porter had been unfairly convicted of cowardice and disobedience at the Second Battle of Bull Run. The Schofield report used evidence of former Confederate commanders and concluded that Pope himself bore most of the responsibility for the Union loss. The report characterized Pope as reckless and dangerously uninformed about events during the battle, also criticized General Irvin McDowell (whom Pope detested), and credited Porter's perceived disobedience with saving the Union army from complete ruin.

Pope was promoted to major general in the Regular Army in 1882 and was assigned to command of the Military Division of the Pacific in 1883 where he served until his retirement.

== Death and legacy ==
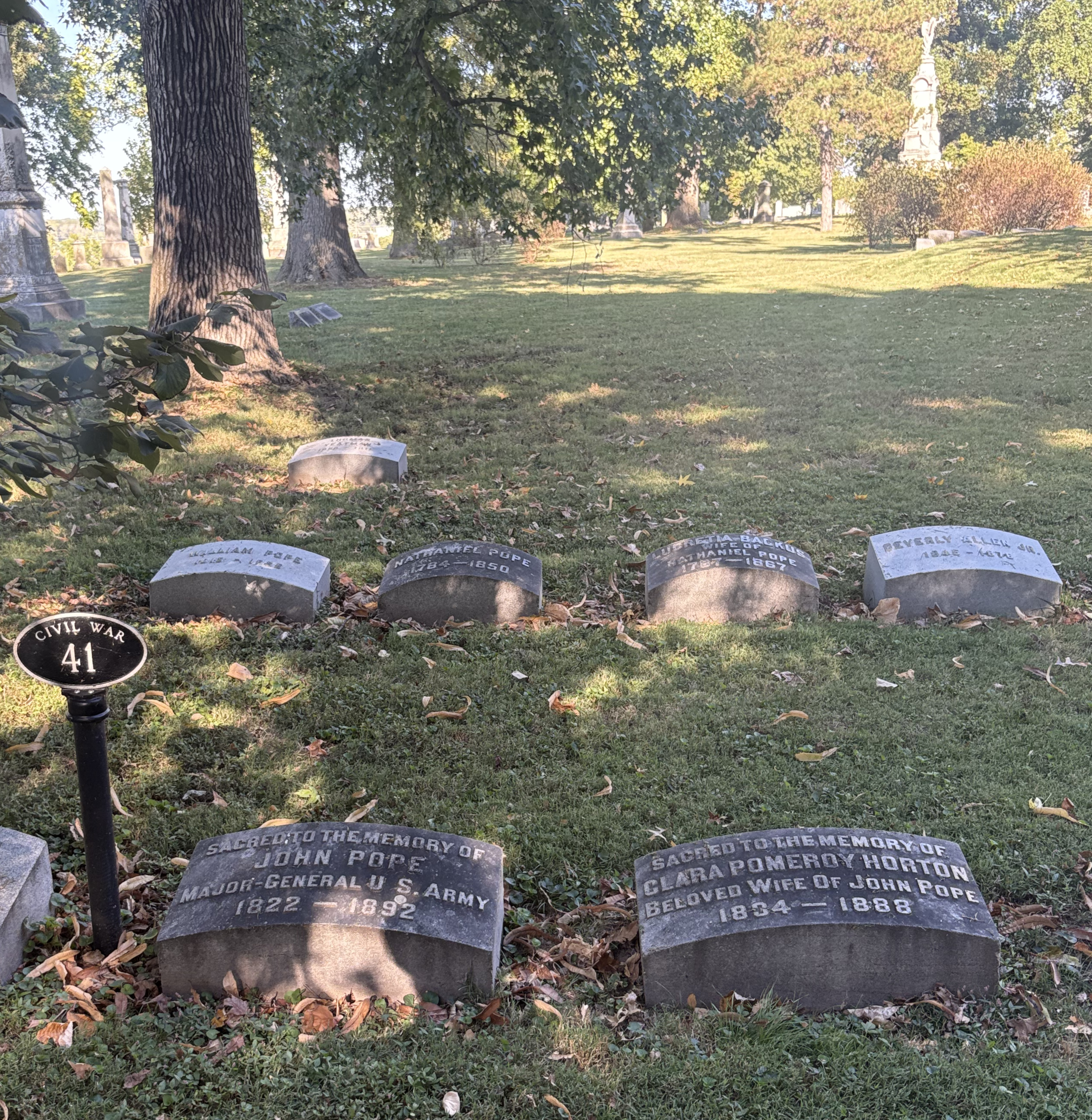
Pope's grave (front left) at Bellefontaine Cemetery

Pope retired as a major general in the Regular Army on March 16, 1886, and his wife, Clara Pope, died two years later. The National Tribune serialized his memoirs, publishing them between February 1887 and March 1891. General Pope died on September 23, 1892, at the Ohio Soldiers' Home near Sandusky, Ohio. He is buried beside his wife in Bellefontaine Cemetery, St. Louis, Missouri.

== See also ==
- List of American Civil War generals (Union)
- The Court-martial of Fitz John Porter

== Notes ==
Military offices
Preceded by (none)	Commander of the Army of the Mississippi; February 23, 1862 – June 26, 1862	Succeeded by William S. Rosecrans
