= First Battle of Auburn =

Battle of the American Civil War

- Part of the American Civil War
Date	October 13, 1863
Location	Fauquier County, Virginia 38.70°N 77.70°W
Result	Inconclusive

Belligerents
United States (Union)	(Confederate States of America) CSA (Confederacy)

Commanders and leaders
William H. French	J.E.B. Stuart

Strength
2,000	3,000

Casualties and losses
- 50
- Location of the battle in Virginia First Battle of Auburn (the United States)

The First Battle of Auburn was fought on October 13, 1863, between Union infantry and Confederate cavalry forces at the start of the Bristoe Campaign during the American Civil War. A Union infantry column stumbled upon a Confederate cavalry reconnaissance party and a short, inconclusive fight ensued. The Confederate cavalry withdrew in the face of the superior Union force, but a much larger body of Confederate cavalry under Maj. Gen. J.E.B. Stuart, attempting to raid a Union wagon train became entrapped by the column, forcing them to abandon the raid and hide in a ravine overnight awaiting Confederate infantry to come to their aid.

== Background ==
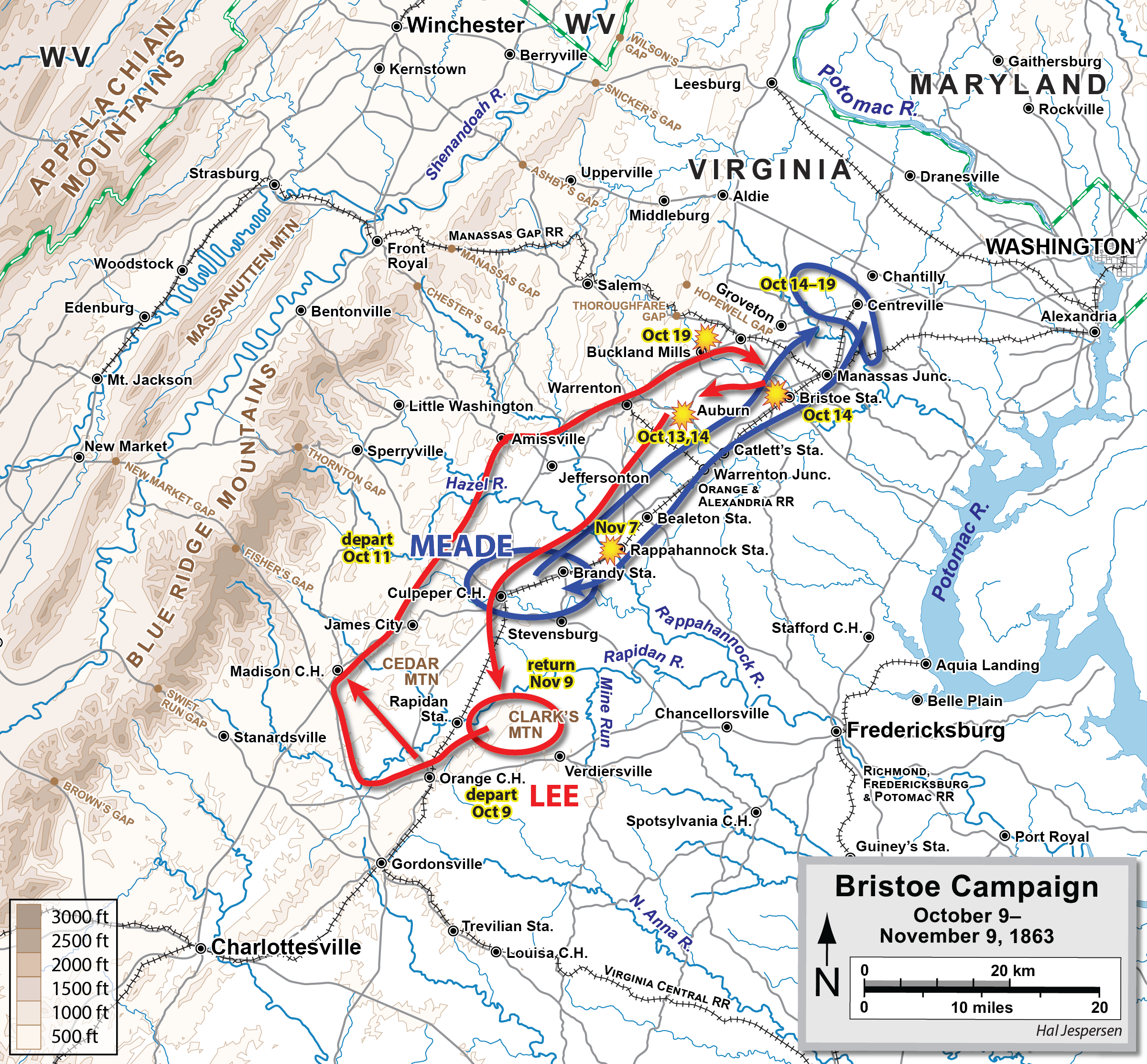
Bristoe Campaign Confederate Union

Following the conclusion of the Gettysburg campaign, the Confederate Army of Northern Virginia and Union Army of the Potomac regrouped on their previous positions astride opposite banks of the Rapidan River. For the duration of the summer both armies remained inactive, reorganizing and resupplying after the devastation wrought at Gettysburg. In early September, Lt. Gen. James Longstreet was dispatched with two divisions to aid the Confederate war effort in the West. After the Confederate victory at Chickamauga, which Longstreet helped secure, Maj. Gen. George Meade was forced to send the XI and XII Corps to help secure Middle Tennessee. When Gen. Robert E. Lee learned of the reassignment of the two Union Corps he decided to go on the offensive and force the Army of the Potomac to give battle on ground of his choosing.

Lee's plan was much the same as that of the Northern Virginia Campaign the year prior: turn the Union right flank by threatening Washington, D.C., using a forced march to the west around the Union line. To that end Lt. Gen. Richard Ewell's and Lt. Gen. A.P. Hill's corps were ordered to sweep around the Union right flank, Maj. Gen. Fitzhugh Lee, with three brigades of cavalry and infantry each, was to secure the Rapidan and prevent a Union advance into central Virginia, and Maj. Gen. J.E.B. Stuart was to lead the cavalry in advance of the infantry. The Confederate advance began on October 8 and was almost immediately detected by Union spies and the signaling station atop Cedar Mountain. Unsure of whether Lee was attempting to turn his right flank or make a retrograde movement toward Richmond, Meade ordered dispositions to counter either threat.

The offensive began on October 10 when Stuart led a diversionary attack on Brig. Gen. George A. Custer's division holding the Robinson River west of Culpeper Courthouse. This movement convinced Meade that Lee did not intend to fall back toward Richmond, and Meade moved back on Rappahannock Station to counter Lee's movement. On October 12 Confederate infantry were spotted at Amissville, convincing Meade that Lee planned to send his army through Thoroughfare Gap as he had in 1862. Accordingly, Meade retreated toward Centreville along the Orange and Alexandria Railroad to defend Washington from such a movement. Lee, however, intended to converge on Warrenton and stay to the south of the Bull Run Mountains. On October 13, Stuart was dispatched to reconnoiter the position of the Union left flank as it withdrew toward Centreville.

== Battle ==
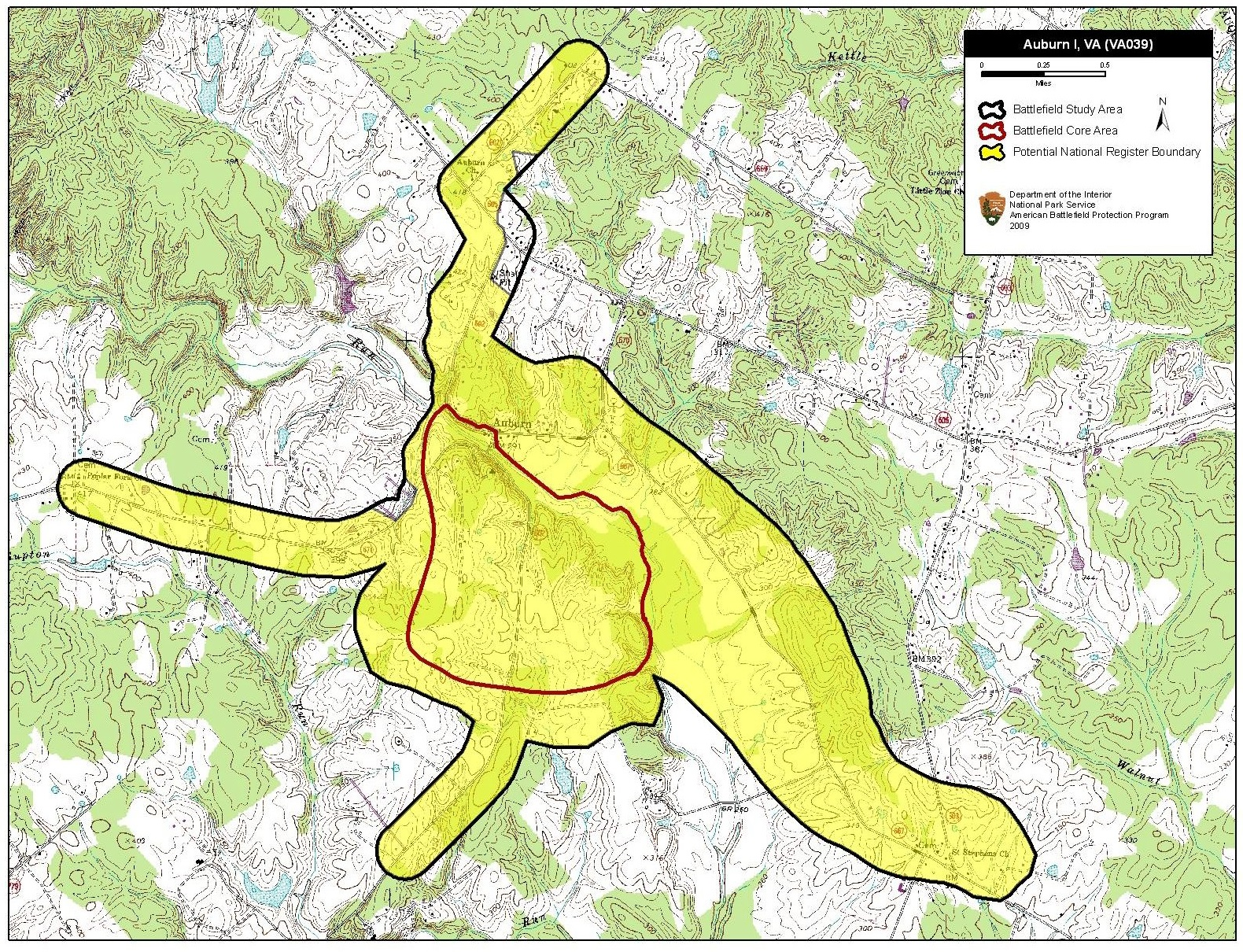
Map of Auburn I Battlefield core and study areas by the American Battlefield Protection Program.

At 10 a.m. on October 13, Stuart sent Brig. Gen. Lunsford L. Lomax's brigade east from Warrenton. Stuart followed an hour later with two brigades . Lomax stopped at Auburn to wait for Stuart and dispatched scouts further east who soon discovered Brig. Gen. John Buford's cavalry at Warrenton Junction, guarding the Federal wagon train advancing east by the O&A railroad. No scouts were dispatched to the south however, and the presence of the Union II and III Corps, which had become separated from the main body of the Union army due to confusion during the frequent repositioning of the past few days, marching north toward Auburn.

Stuart arrived at Auburn around 1 p.m. and then rode east to Catlett's Station to reconnoiter the Union wagon train, leaving Lomax to hold Auburn and dispatching his aide, Capt. William B. Blackford to scout to the south of Auburn. Blackford got lost and failed to discover the approaching Federal column. Stuart, meanwhile, impressed by the size of the wagon train, sent a dispatch to Fitzhugh Lee at Warrenton, ordering him to aid in the attack. Lee left Warrenton at 4 p.m. and followed Stuart's path through Auburn.

The Union column led by Maj. Gen. William H. French's III Corps, followed by Brig. Gen. Gouverneur K. Warren's II Corps, approached Auburn about 4:15 p.m. French had dispatched his cavalry under Brig. Gen. H. Judson Kilpatrick to the north to guard his left flank from Confederate cavalry at Warrenton, leaving the column without the cavalry at its head, thus allowing it to stumble into the Confederates at Auburn. French and his staff, at the head of the column, fired their revolvers at the Confederates as the infantry and artillery were brought up. Lomax attempted to charge the Federal line but a volley of canister shot drove back the assault. By 4:45 the fighting died down, just as Lee arrived from Warrenton. Seeing they were facing two infantry corps, Lee and Lomax withdrew to Warrenton.

== Aftermath ==
The short fight resulted in only about 50 casualties, but had deep repercussions for Stuart and the developing campaign. Blackford, finally alerted to the presence of the Federals, notified Stuart of the situation. Seeing that he was trapped between the II and III Corps to his northwest and the wagon train to the southeast, Stuart led his command, some 3,000 men and horses, five ordnance wagons, and seven artillery pieces, into a wooded ravine east of Auburn, only 300 yards (270 m) from Warren's bivouac. After dark, Stuart sent six scouts dressed in Federal uniforms through the Union lines to get word to Robert E. Lee. Lee accordingly dispatched Ewell to Auburn at dawn to rescue Stuart and his cavalry setting up the Second Battle of Auburn the following day.

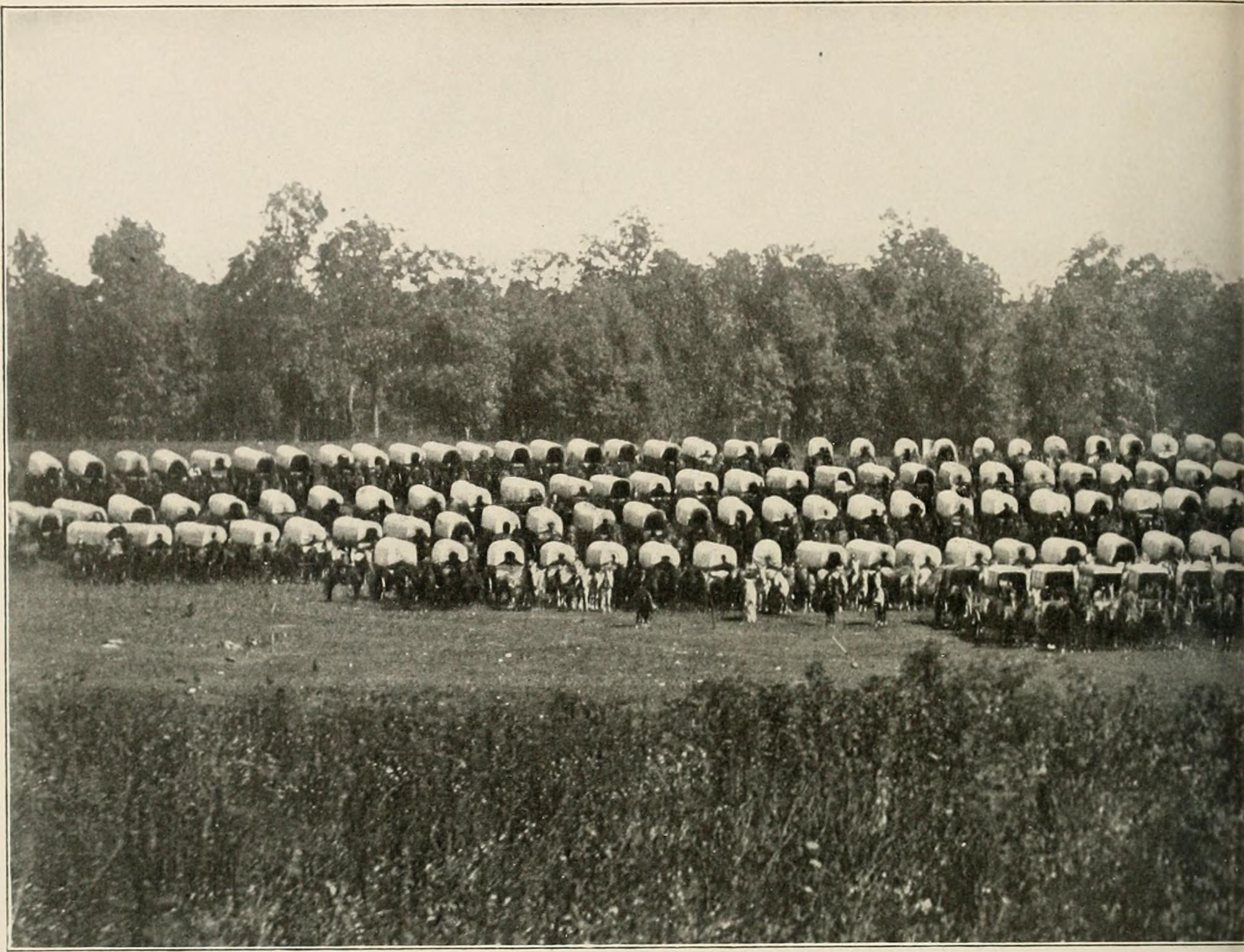
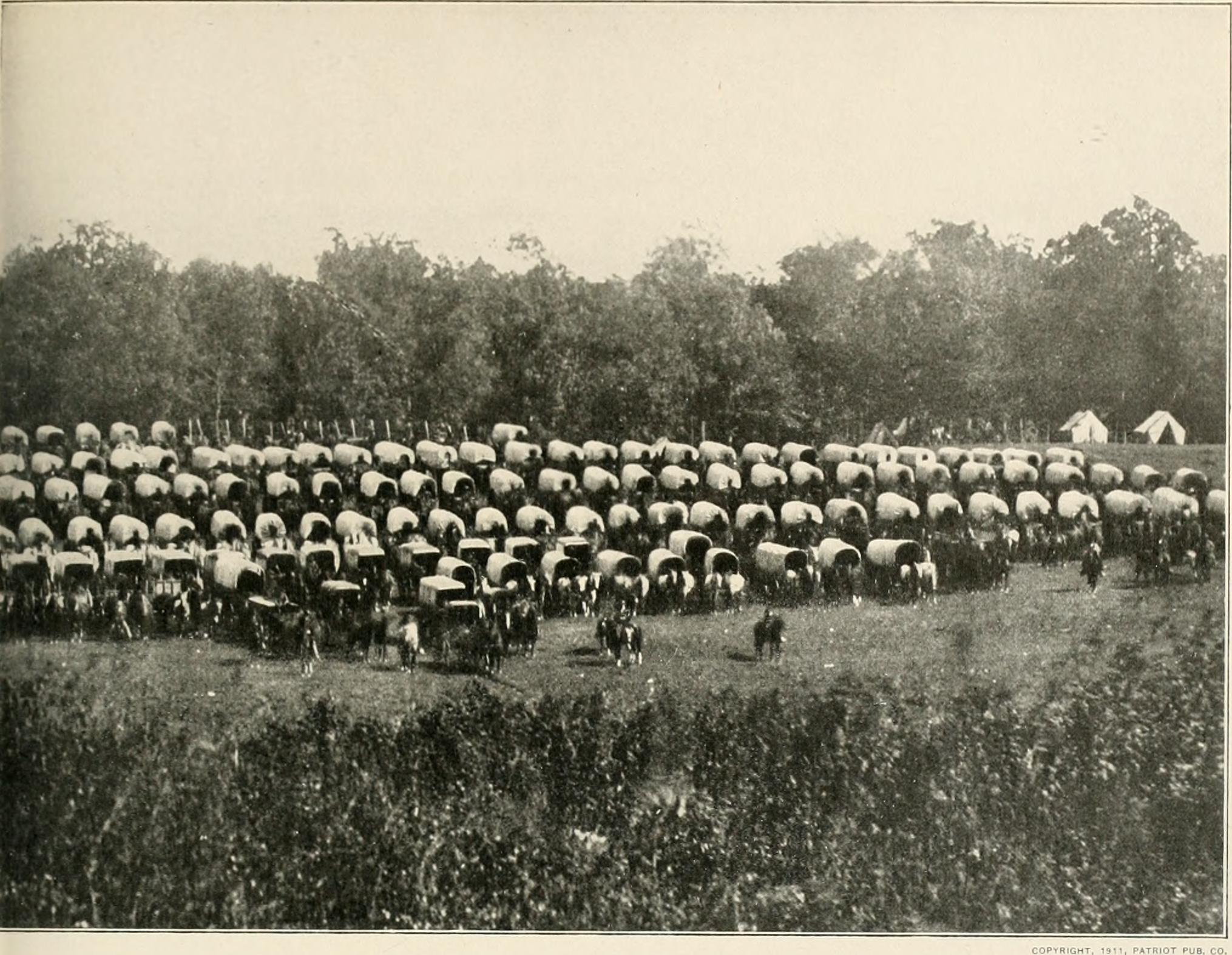
Photograph of a typical corps sized wagon train of the union army

== See also ==
- Auburn Battlefield
