= Liberty, Virginia =

Liberty, Virginia may refer to:

- The historic name for Bedford, Virginia
- Liberty, Caroline County, Virginia, an unincorporated community in Caroline County
- Liberty, Fauquier County, Virginia, an unincorporated community in Fauquier County
- Liberty, Halifax County, Virginia, an unincorporated community in Halifax County
- Liberty, Highland County, Virginia, an unincorporated community in Highland County
- Liberty, Tazewell County, Virginia, an unincorporated community in Tazewell County
