= John Gobin (polo) =

American six-goal polo player

John S. Gobin
Personal information
- Nationality: American
- Occupation: Polo player
- Years active: 1990s–present
- Children: 1 daughter

Sport
- Sport: Polo
- Club: Great Meadow Polo Club
- Updated on 26 June 2026

John S. Gobin is an American six-goal polo player. He won the Westchester Cup in 1992, and has managed the Great Meadow Polo Club in Virginia since 2007.

== Early life ==
John S. Gobin grew up in Rehoboth, Massachusetts. He began playing arena polo in interscholastic competitions at the age of fifteen. From the age of seventeen to nineteen, he trained to become a polo player in Argentina.

== Polo ==
He began his career by playing with polo patron Geoffrey Kent, the founder of Abercrombie & Kent. He then played on the Budweiser Polo Team. He is now a six-goal polo player.

He won the Westchester Cup alongside Adam Snow, Owen Rinehart and Robert E. Walton at the Guards Polo Club in England in 1992. He won the Camacho Cup on the American team against Mexico in 2009. He has competed on several USA Teams including for the International Polo Tour global polo matches and Team USA against Argentina. He has also played on the Duck Hill Polo Team at the Aiken Polo Club in Aiken, South Carolina. He has also won the U.S. Arena Championships four times and competed on the United States Polo Team against Italy in the America's Polo Cup winning the world cup in 2011. Today he plays on the IPT TEAM USA sponsored by Celebrity Cruises & Hotels at Sea global polo programs.

He has been the manager of the Great Meadow Polo Club in The Plains, Fauquier County, Virginia since 2007.

== Personal life ==
He winters in Wellington, Florida, and summers in The Plains, Virginia. He also owns the Four Oaks Farm in Aiken, South Carolina. His wife is an equine veterinarian. They have a daughter.

In March 2024, Gobin was accused by several women of having committed sexual harassment and misconduct when they were teenagers. He counter-sued one of the women and his former business partner in May 2024. Since June 6, 2024, he is the subject of two arrest warrants in Virginia for the misdemeanor of consensual sex with minors.
