= Bleak =

Bleak may refer to:

== Fish ==
- Species of the genus Alburnus
- Some species of the genus Acanthobrama
- Alburnoides bipunctatus, also known as the schneider
- Alburnoides oblongus, Tashkent riffle bleak
- Aphyocypris chinensis, Chinese bleak
- Kinneret bleak from the Sea of Galilee

== Music ==
- "Bleak", a song by Opeth from Blackwater Park
- "Bleak", a song by Soulfly from Dark Ages
- "Bleak", a song by Tremonti from Marching in Time

== Other uses ==
- Bleak, Virginia, a community in the U.S.
- David B. Bleak, decorated US soldier of the Korean War

== See also ==
- Bleek (disambiguation)
