= John Marshall Birthplace Park =

Park in Fauquier County, Virginia, United States

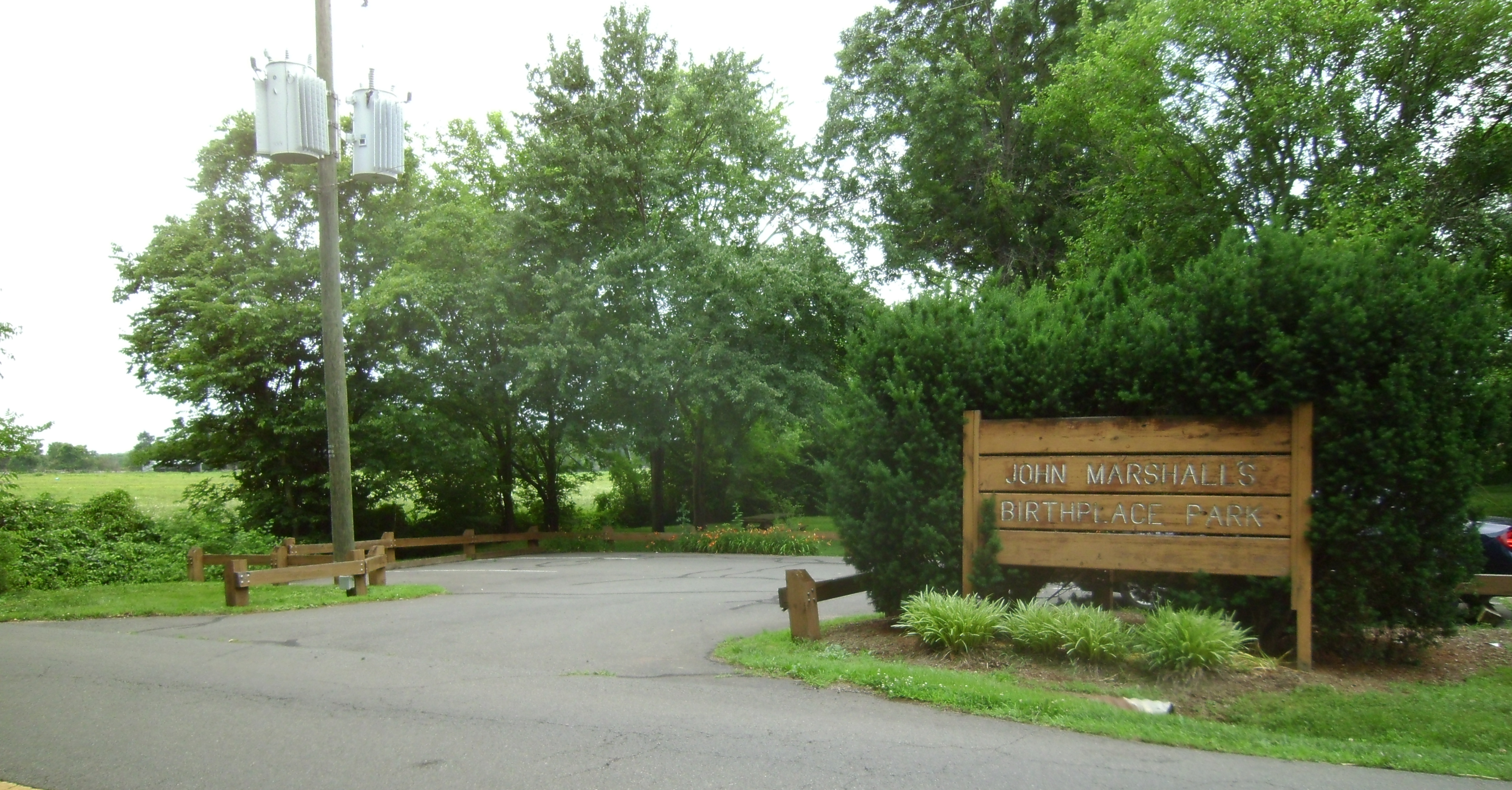
- Park entrance

- Location within Virginia Location within the United States
- Location: Fauquier county, Virginia, USA
- Nearest city: Midland, Virginia
- Coordinates: 38°36′19″N 77°42′34″W
- Area: 6 acres (2.4 ha)
- Created: June 8, 1978
- Operator: Fauquier County Parks and Recreation
- Open: daily from dawn to dusk
- Hiking trails: 1
- Parking: 4 spaces + 1 handicapped

John Marshall Birthplace Park is a small park located in the historic Germantown area in southern Fauquier County, Virginia. The park provides access to a dedication monument at or near the birthplace of John Marshall, the fourth chief justice of the United States from 1801 until his death in 1835.

== Description ==
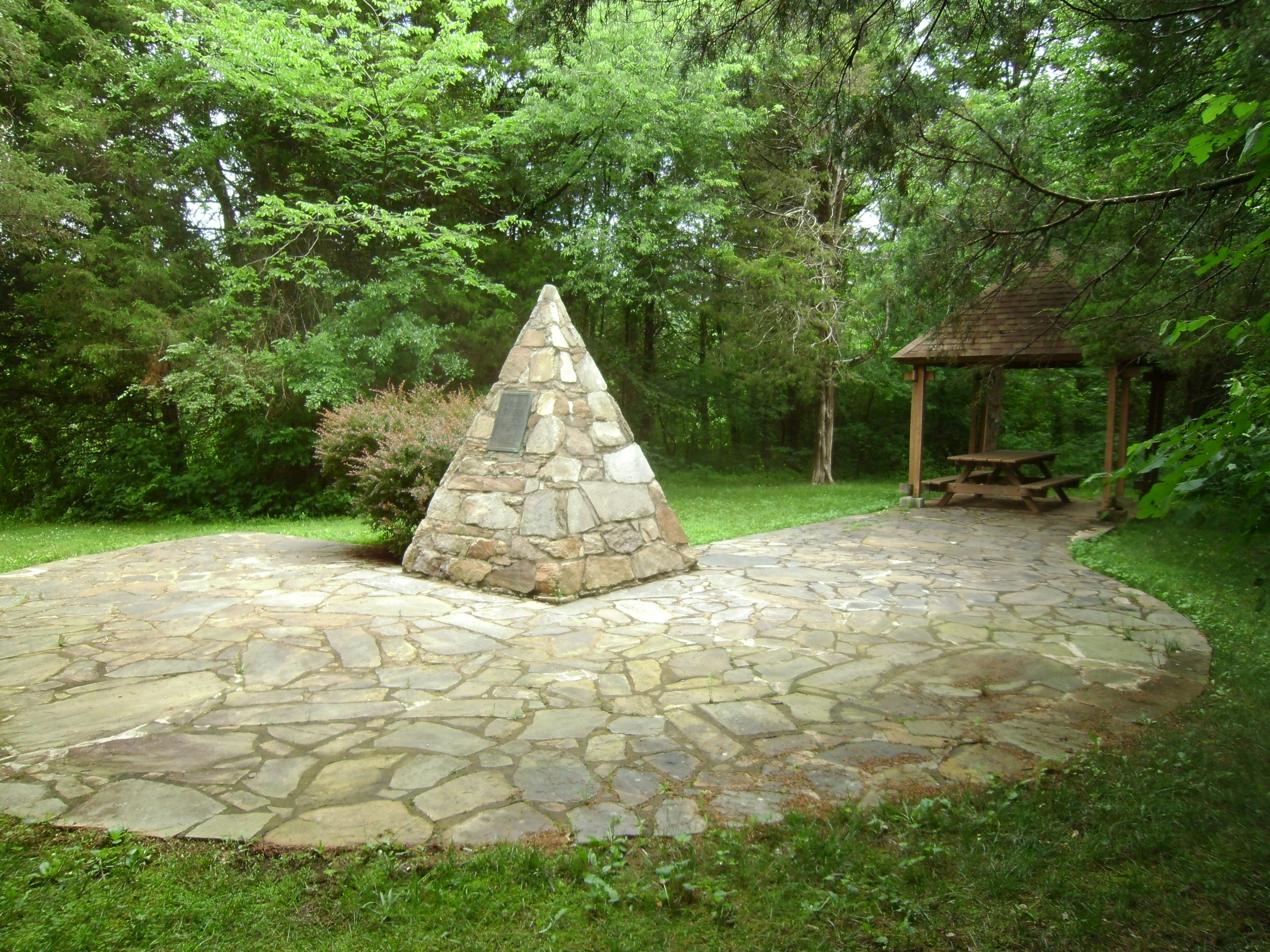
Monument at John Marshall birthplace

The park consists of parking and picnic areas on Germantown Road in Midland, Virginia, a walking trail to the birthplace monument and the monument near the site of John Marshall's birth with an adjacent picnic shelter. Interpretive signs near the park entrance and trail head give a brief educational description of John Marshall's life.

The walking trail follows the path of a small stream for approximately half a mile (.8 km) (Note: References state the trail length as from .5 to .75 miles (.8 to 1.2 km). Some travel guides incorrectly give the distance as .25 miles (.4 km). The distance to the monument is approximately .75 miles from the parking area, approximately .5 miles from the trail head marker at the back of the main picnic area of the park) to the monument near the site of the residence where Marshall was born.

== History ==
Thomas Marshall, John Marshall's father, moved to Germantown with his new wife in 1754. John Marshall was born the following year in a substantial 1 1/2-story structure described as "similar to the 1724 Tilman Weaver house" rather than a log cabin. (Note: The Tilman Weaver house was actually a frame structure built of hewn oak beams and plastered with a mixture of clay, small stones and straw. A photograph of the Tilman Weaver house is available here)

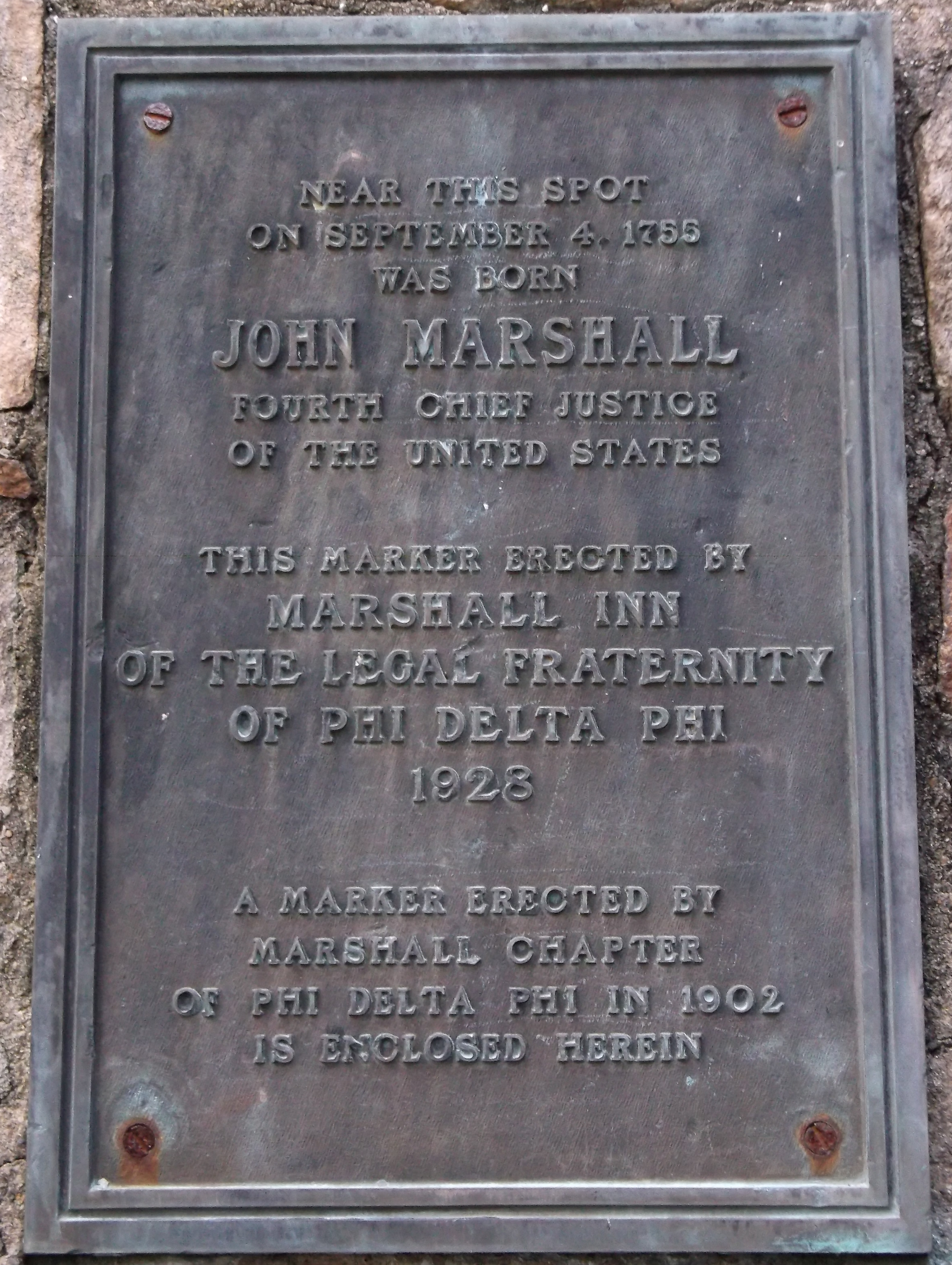
Plaque affixed to monument

A marker was erected at the home site by the Marshall chapter of the Phi Delta Phi legal fraternity at George Washington University in 1902. That marker was enclosed by a larger monument in 1928. John Marshall Birthplace Park was Fauquier County's first public park. The 6-acre (2.4 ha) park was dedicated on June 8, 1978.

The plaque on the Marshall birthplace monument states, "Near this spot on September 4, 1755, was born John Marshall". The location of the marker and monument were based on oral history so the location of the house was in doubt. Researchers from the William and Mary Center for Archaeological Research, College of William and Mary, conducted background research and a limited on-site survey and testing in July 2005. Eighteenth-century domestic artifacts found at the site and background research support the site as the likely location of the dwelling of the Marshall family at the time of John Marshall's birth.

== Birding and wildlife ==
The trail to the monument is listed as a part of Virginia's birding and wildlife trail system. The park is notable for the presence of tawny emperor and Eastern tiger swallowtail butterflies and a variety of resident and migratory birds that may be observed along the trail and adjoining agricultural fields.
