= John Gobin =

John Gobin may refer to:

- John P. S. Gobin, Union Army officer and Lieutenant Governor of Pennsylvania
- John Gobin (polo), American polo player
