= Virginia Gold Cup =

- Previous: 2025 Virginia Gold Cup; May 3, 2025; Next: 2026 Virginia Gold Cup; May 2, 2026
- Location: Great Meadow Race Course; The Plains, Virginia
- Inaugurated: April 3, 1922 (104 years ago)
- Race type: Steeplechase
- Sponsor: Great Meadow Foundation
- Website: Virginia Gold Cup

Race information
- Distance: 4 Miles
- Record: 8:15, Doc Cebu (2020)
- Surface: Turf
- Purse: US$450,000; 1st: $60,000

The Virginia Gold Cup and International Gold Cup are annual steeplechase races held in The Plains, Virginia. Together, the races have become two of the largest outdoor social events held in Virginia. The races have been held in Fauquier County since 1922. It is sometimes seen as Virginia's answer to the Kentucky Derby.

The Virginia Gold Cup is held the first Saturday of May at Great Meadow, a field events center created and bequeathed by the Arundel Family in 1984. The International Gold Cup is the featured horse racing event of the Fall season and is managed today by the Virginia Gold Cup Association. Now held on the third Saturday of October, the International Gold Cup was founded in Tennessee in 1930.

== History ==
There is a history of horse racing in the region dating back to the 19th century; however, the Virginia Gold Cup itself was not created until 1922. The race was created by eight sportsmen who met at the Fauquier Club in Warrenton and organized a four-mile race alongside the natural walls and fences of the nearby hunting countryside on April 3, 1922, and thirty-four days later was the first Virginia Gold Cup race.

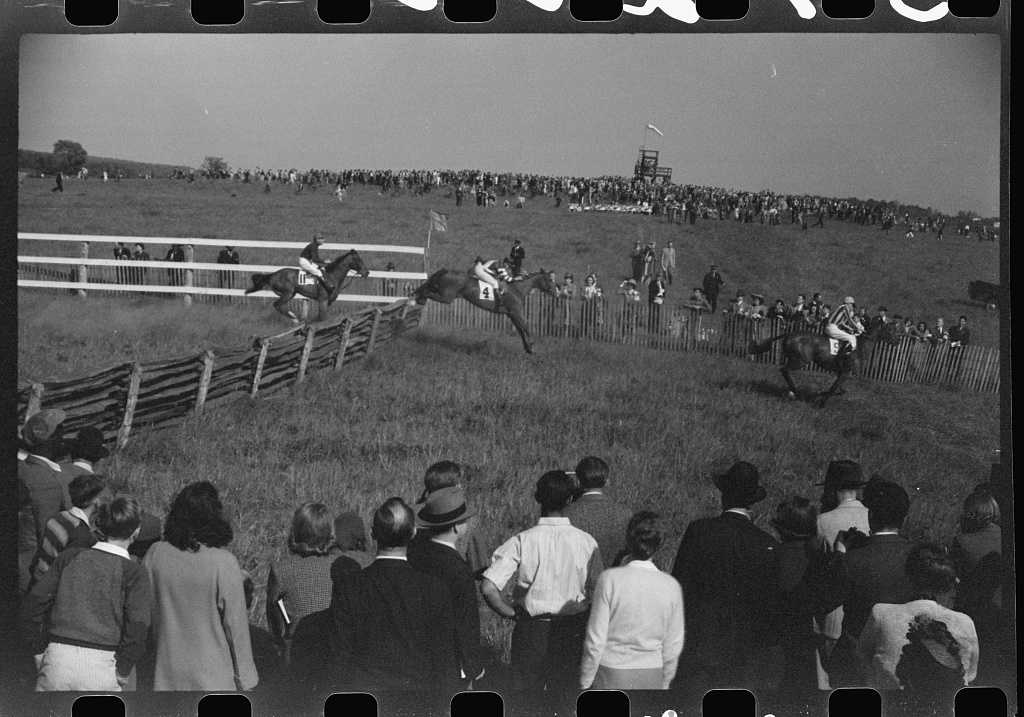
1941 Virginia Gold Cup Race

Washington businessman Russell M. Arundel was chairman of the Virginia Gold Cup from 1930 to 1955. In 1980, his son Arthur W. "Nick" Arundel purchased Great Meadow, a 500-acre tract of open space in The Plains which he developed for more than $5 million into a new home for The Gold Cup, which at the time was threatened by development in Warrenton. Arundel served as Chairman of Great Meadow and of the Virginia Gold Cup for nearly two decades until his passing in 2011.

From 1994 to 1999, a horse named Saluter won six individual Virginia Gold Cup races. Overall, Saluter won 22 of his 43 lifetime starts. As of 2025, Saluter has won the most races in the history of the Virginia Gold Cup.

The 2016 event drew more than 50,000 spectators. The 2024 International Gold Cup was held in Middleburg, Virginia, instead of in The Plains.

In 2025, the event held its 100th race despite being older than a century. This was due to World War II and a scheduling conflict preventing the race in the years 1943–1945 and 1948 respectively. The race was almost cancelled in 2020 due to the COVID-19 pandemic, as well.

Additional activities include terrier and pony races before the main event, hat contests on Members Hill, vendor tents and booths, parachute demonstrations, classic and new car displays, and countless tailgates.

Viewing areas are divided into three basic sections: North Rail, South Rail, and Members Hill. Members Hill overlooks Winners Circle and has the best view of the course. All three sections include private tents, public viewing areas, and tailgate spaces. North Rail is geared more toward young professionals and social groups; South Rail is where most corporate tents and family-oriented outings congregate.

== Winners ==
Virginia Gold Cup winners
Year	Horse	Jockey	Trainer	Owner	Time	Turf	Course
2025	Keys Discount	G. Watters	Jack Fisher	Mrs. John R.S. Fisher	8:56 4/5	Firm	Great Meadow Course
2024	Schoodic	G. Watters	Jack Fisher	Mrs. John R.S. Fisher	8:57 3/5	Soft	Great Meadow Course
2023	Mystic Strike	G. Galligan	Todd McKenna	Upland Partners	8:25 3/5	Good	Great Meadow Course
2022	Andi'amu	F. Procter	Leslie Young	Ballybristol Farm LLC	9:26 1/5	Soft	Great Meadow Course
2021	Schoodic	H. Frost	Jack Fisher	Mrs. John R.S. Fisher	8:31 2/5	Good	Great Meadow Course
2020	Doc Cebu	M. Mitchell	Jack Fisher	Charles C. Fenwick Jr.	8:15 2/5	Good	Great Meadow Course
2019	Andi'amu	J. Doyle	Leslie Young	Ballybristol Farm LLC	9:12 2/5	Good	Great Meadow Course
2018	Zanclus	Kieran Norris	Niel Morris	Sara E. Collette	8:43 4/5	Good	Great Meadow Course
2017	Ebanour	Gustan Dahl	Cyril Murphy	Irvin Naylor			Great Meadow Course
2016	Ebanour	Gustan Dahl	Cyril Murphy	Irvin Naylor			Great Meadow Course
2015	Grinding Speed	M. Beecher	Alicia Murphy	Michael T. Wharton			Great Meadow Course
2014	Hot Rize	William McCarthy		Holston Hall	9:20 4/5		Great Meadow Course
2013	Grinding Speed	Mark Bucher		Michael T. Wharton	8:50 4/5		Great Meadow Course
2012	Incomplete	Joey Elliott		Robert A. Kinsley	8:38 4/5		Great Meadow Course
2011	Bon Caddo	Dawn P. Williams		Merriefield Farms	8:25		Great Meadow Course
2010	Bubble Economy	Paddy Young		Arcadia Stable	8:22 4/5		Great Meadow Course
2009	Salmo	Daren Nagel		Irvin S. Naylor	8:33 3/5		Great Meadow Course
2008	Bubble Economy	Chip Miller		Arcadia Stable	8:48		Great Meadow Course
2007	Salmo	Chip Miller		Irvin S. Naylor	8:24 3/5		Great Meadow Course
2006	Miles Ahead	Chris Read		Kinross Farm	8:19		Great Meadow Course
2005	Miles Ahead	Chris Read		Kinross Farm	8:40 4/5		Great Meadow Course
2004	Joe At Six	Louis Neilson III		Michele L. Hunter	8:48 2/5		Great Meadow Course
2003	Lord Kenneth	Matthew McCarron		Kinross Farm	8:28 3/5		Great Meadow Course
2002	Make Me A Champ	Blyth Miller		Irvin S. Naylor	8:27 2/5		Great Meadow Course
2001	Ironfist	Roger Horgan		John H. Filbert III	8:29 4/5		Great Meadow Course
2000	Priceless Room	Joseph Delozier III		Big Wood Stable	8:26 3/5		Great Meadow Course
1999	Saluter	Jack Fisher		Henry Stern	8:23 4/5		Great Meadow Course
1998	Saluter	Jack Fisher		Henry Stern	8:58 4/5		Great Meadow Course
1997	Saluter	Jack Fisher		Henry Stern	8:46 4/5		Great Meadow Course
1996	Saluter	Jack Fisher		Henry Stern	8:47		Great Meadow Course
1995	Saluter	Jack Fisher		Henry Stern	8:27		Great Meadow Course
1994	Saluter	Jack Fisher		Henry Stern	8:46 3/5		Great Meadow Course
1993	Kuujjuaq	John Bosley		H. Turney McKnight	8:38 3/5		Great Meadow Course
1992	Push and Pull	Jack Fisher		Dover Ridge Farm	8:29		Great Meadow Course
1991	Joe's OK	Sanna Neilson		Oliver Keelan	8:30		Great Meadow Course
1990	Von Csadek	Patrick Worral		Sheppard-Worral Stables	8:51		Great Meadow Course
1989	Call Louis	Jack Fisher		Sheila Williams	9:45 3/5		Great Meadow Course
1988	Von Csadek	Patrick Worrall		Scanden Stables	8:45		Great Meadow Course
1987	Ozymandias	William Wofford		Irene Roeckel	8:38		Great Meadow Course
1986	Sugar Bee	Charles Fenwick Jr.		Arthur W. Arundel	8:49 1/5		Great Meadow Course
1985	Prince Saran	Paul Sloan		John R. Neal	8:29 2/5		Great Meadow Course
1984	Constantine	D.M. Smithwick Jr.		Joseph M. Rogers	9:03 3/5		Broadview Farm Course
1983	Private Gary	R. Waterman		Joseph M. Rogers	8:36 3/5		Broadview Farm Course
1982	Prince Saran	Paul Sloan		John R. Neal	8:56		Broadview Farm Course
1981	Juggernaut II	J. Fisher		John R.S. Fisher	8:50 4/5		Broadview Farm Course
1980	Tong	H.T. McKnight		H. Turney	8:54 2/5		Broadview Farm Course
1979	Sam Son Of A Gun	C. Fenwick		W. Wallace Lanahan Jr.	9:03 3/5		Broadview Farm Course
1978	Navy Davy	D. Yovanovich		Ernest Scott	9:11 1/5		Broadview Farm Course
1977	Pat's Gamble	B. Secor		H.E. Burkheimer	9:08 3/5		Broadview Farm Course
1976	Semington	C. Fenwick		W. Wallace Lanahan Jr.	9:17		Broadview Farm Course
1975	Chapel Street	L. Nielson III		Rokeby Stables	9:10		Broadview Farm Course
1974	Mongogo	W. Moore		Rokeby Stables	8:33 3/5		Broadview Farm Course
1973	Portobelo III	G. Flautt		Bella Vista Farm	9:04 1/5		Broadview Farm Course
1972	King of Spades	J. Aitcheson Jr.		Joseph M. Rogers	9:12 3/5		Broadview Farm Course
1971	Annual Meeting	J. Aitcheson Jr.		John W. Warner	8:27 3/5		Broadview Farm Course
1970	King of Spades	D. Small		Thomas H. McKoy Jr.	8:47		Broadview Farm Course
1969	Annual Meeting	W. Moore		John W. Warner	8:54 3/5		Broadview Farm Course
1968	Walrus	J. Aitcheson Jr.		A.C. Randolph	8:48 2/5		Broadview Farm Course
1967	Leeds Don	J. Aitcheson Jr.		David L. Ferguson	9:15		Broadview Farm Course
1966	Leeds Don	W. Moore		David L. Ferguson	8:51 1/5		Broadview Farm Course
1965	Leeds Don	N. Lowry		David L. Ferguson	8:46		Broadview Farm Course
1964	Moon Rock	J. Aitcheson Jr.		Paul R. Fout	9:38 4/5		Broadview Farm Course
1963	Hill Tie	A.P. Smithwick		June H. McKnight	8:52		Broadview Farm Course
1962	Hill Tie	A.P. Smithwick		June H. McKnight	8:58		Broadview Farm Course
1961	Mainstay	J. Aitcheson Jr.		Wm. E. Schlusemeyer	7:52 2/5		Broadview Farm Course
1960	Ricacho	J. Aitcheson Jr.		Randolph D. Rouse	8:29		Broadview Farm Course
1959	Judge Beacon	J. Walker		George P. Greenhalgh	7:30		Broadview Farm Course
1958	Coup-de-Vite	K. Field		Mrs. Henry Obre	9:11		Broadview Farm Course
1957	Grand Chal	J. Aitcheson Jr.		Alfred H. Smith	8:54 3/5		Broadview Farm Course
1956	Gillian	G. Stephens		Capt. J.L.B. Bentley	8:58 3/5		Broadview Farm Course
1955	Uncle Pierre	B.H. Murray		Cyrus Manierre	8:41 3/5		Broadview Farm Course
1954	Lancrel	F. Bonsal Jr.		Hugh J. O'Donovan	7:22 1/5		Broadview Farm Course
1953	Rayquick	D.M. Smithwick		C.M. Greer Jr.	7:36 1/5		Broadview Farm Course
1952	Gift of Gold	F.D. Adams		Mrs. Simon T. Patterson	7:34 3/5		Broadview Farm Course
1951	Mister Mars	H. Bennett		A.S. Carhart	8:00 3/5		Broadview Farm Course
1950	Done Sleeping	D.M. Smithwick		Alvin Untermyer	Unknown		Broadview Farm Course
1949	Never Worry	L. Manogue		Thomas Stokes	7:03 1/5		Broadview Farm Course
1947	Never Worry	Alex Stokes		Thomas Stokes	8:30		Broadview Farm Course
1946	Houseman	John Bosley		C.M. Greer Jr.	9:43 1/5		Broadview Farm Course
1942	Sir Romeo	Robert Utterback		Mrs. A.S. Carhart	7:35		Broadview Farm Course
1941	Goldun	John Bosley		C.M. Greer Jr.	7:29 4/5		Broadview Farm Course
1940	Black Sweep	J.S. Harrison		Mrs. Frank M. Gould	8:32 2/5		Broadview Farm Course
1939	Or Else	Sidney Watters		W.F. Cochran Jr.	7:48 4/5		Broadview Farm Course
1938	Ostend	William B. Streett		Mrs. Frank M. Gould	7:59 3/5		Broadview Farm Course
1937	Ostend	William B. Streett		Mrs. Frank M. Gould	7:48 1/5		Broadview Farm Course
1936	Ghost Dancer	Noel Liang		Carlton H. Palmer	7:34		Broadview Farm Course
1935	Indigo	W.B. Cocks		John Schiff	7:43 3/5		Broadview Farm Course
1934	Melita II	Jack Skinner		Mrs. Sumner Pingree	9:50 4/5		Clovercroft Course
1933	The Prophet	Jack Skinner		Mrs. Sumner Pingree	Unknown		Clovercroft Course
1932	Melita II	Jack Skinner		Mrs. Sumner Pingree	Unknown		Clovercroft Course
1931	Seraglio	William B. Streett		Mrs. John Hay Whitney	Unknown		Clovercroft Course
1930	Soissons	Jack Skinner		Mrs. Sumner Pingree	Unknown		Clovercroft Course
1929	Dunks Green	Frank A. Bonsal		Mrs. Walter J. Salmon	Unknown		Clovercroft Course
1928	Tijuca	Ernest Woolf		Mrs. C.C. Rumsey	Unknown		Broadview Farm Course
1927	Dum Dum	Donald Pearce		Mrs. T.M. Bowen	Unknown		Broadview Farm Course
1926	Billy Barton	Albert G. Ober		Howard Bruce	Unknown		Broadview Farm Course
1925	John Bunny	Raymond Belmont		Mrs. K.E. Hitt	Unknown		Broadview Farm Course
1924	Parana	Arthur White		Mrs. C.E. Perkins	Unknown		Broadview Farm Course
1923	Oddity	Jules Dillon		Mrs. K.E. Hitt	Unknown		Oakwood Course
1922	Irish Laddie	Arthur White		Mrs. K.E. Hitt	Unknown		Oakwood Course
