= Somerville, Virginia =

Unincorporated community in Virginia, United States

Coordinates: 38°31′18″N 77°36′34″W

Location of Somerville within the state of Virginia.

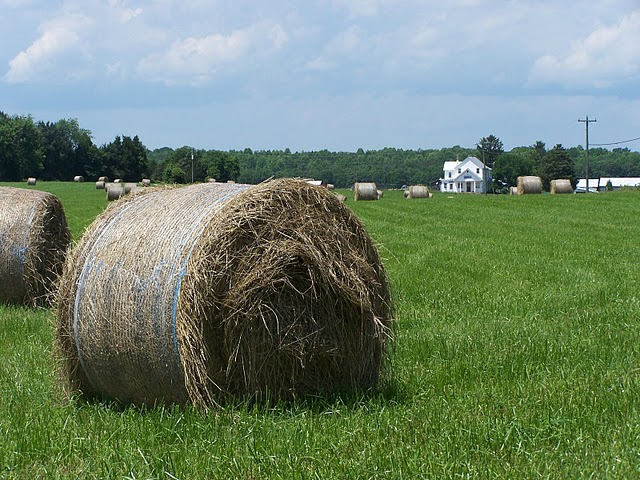
Groves Store, Somerville, as seen from Blackwells Mill Rd, 31 May 2010

Somerville is an unincorporated hamlet in Fauquier County, in the U.S. Commonwealth of Virginia. Somerville, two miles (3 km) west of the remote southwest corner of Marine Corps Base Quantico, can be said to lie at the center of a 225-square-mile (580 km^{2}) diamond-shaped area of mostly countryside bordered by routes US 15, 17, I-95, and SR 234. (These meet at Manassas to the north, Dumfries to the east, Fredericksburg to the south, and Warrenton to the west.) The tongue-in-cheek label "Downtown Somerville" appears on the front of the only retail establishment anywhere near the rural intersection of Midland Road and Bristersburg Road—Groves Store and Somerville Post Office. No other mailboxes lie within ZIP code 22739. No other occupied dwellings are in sight, and it is over six miles (10 km) to the nearest main road, US 17 at Morrisville. In its undated leaflet "Fauquier County Towns, Villages, and Communities", the Fauquier Historical Society says "[o]riginally Somerville was at Ensor's Shop but presently is nearby at what was once called White Ridge". That name survives today as White Ridge Farm. (A decaying homemade sign "Ensor's Shop" appears on the roadside 2.5 miles (4.0 km) west of Somerville near where Ensors Shop Road intersects Midland Road.) How and when this place was first called Somerville may be unknown, but family names are a common source of place names. Wikipedia says elsewhere that "Sir Gualtier de Somerville was one of William the Conqueror's knights... in 1066. The name most likely comes from 'Saint-Omer,' a town about 20 miles south of Dunkirk at the North of France." Almost eight centuries of this noble family's history were documented in a book edited by Sir Walter Scott in 1815.
