= Nick Arundel =

American journalist (1928–2011)

- Born: Arthur Windsor Arundel; January 12, 1928
- Died: February 8, 2011 (aged 83)

Arthur Windsor "Nick" Arundel (January 12, 1928 – February 8, 2011) was a Harvard graduate and former United States Marine Corps combat officer in the Korean War. Arundel covered Washington, D.C., as a correspondent for CBS News and later The White House for United Press International. The founder of Arundel Communications (now ArCom) based near Dulles Airport, he originated in American journalism the concept of 24-hour news cycle All-news radio format at Washington radio station WAVA-FM in 1960. Arundel was board chairman for George Mason College and was instrumental in its expansion from a college, to a university. He was chairman and publisher of the 17 Times Community Newspapers and has been inducted into the Hall of Fame of Virginia Communications.

Arundel died at his home near The Plains, Virginia, on February 8, 2011, at the age of 83. He was named the Outstanding Virginian of 2011 by the Virginia General Assembly. In 2017, a book was published about Arundel's efforts in 1955 to bring two baby gorillas to the National Zoo. The book also includes Arundel's involvement in the creation of the Friends of the National Zoo.

A collection of Arundel's records and materials is housed at the George Mason University Special Collections Research Center.

== Organizations ==
- Founder of Great Meadow and president, Great Meadow Foundation, The Plains, Virginia
- Co-founder and first board chairman, George Mason University, Fairfax, Virginia
- Co-founder of U.S. Marine Corps Heritage Center, Quantico, Virginia
- Co-founder of National Press Foundation and Washington Journalism Center
- Co-founder and past president, Piedmont Environmental Council
- Co-founder and past president, Friends of the National Zoo (FONZ), Washington, D.C.
- Co-founder and past president, African Wildlife Leadership foundation
- Board member, Virginia Higher Education Business Council
- Board member, Sorensen Institute for Political Leadership
- Member, Monticello Founders Board
- Board member, National Sporting Library
- Board member, Waterford Foundation
- Founding chairman and trustee, Journey Through Hallowed Ground Foundation
- Board member, Americans at War Foundation, Washington, D.C.
- Founder and chairman, Morningside Training Farm, The Plains, Virginia
