= Germantown, Virginia =

Unincorporated community in Virginia, United States

- Unincorporated community
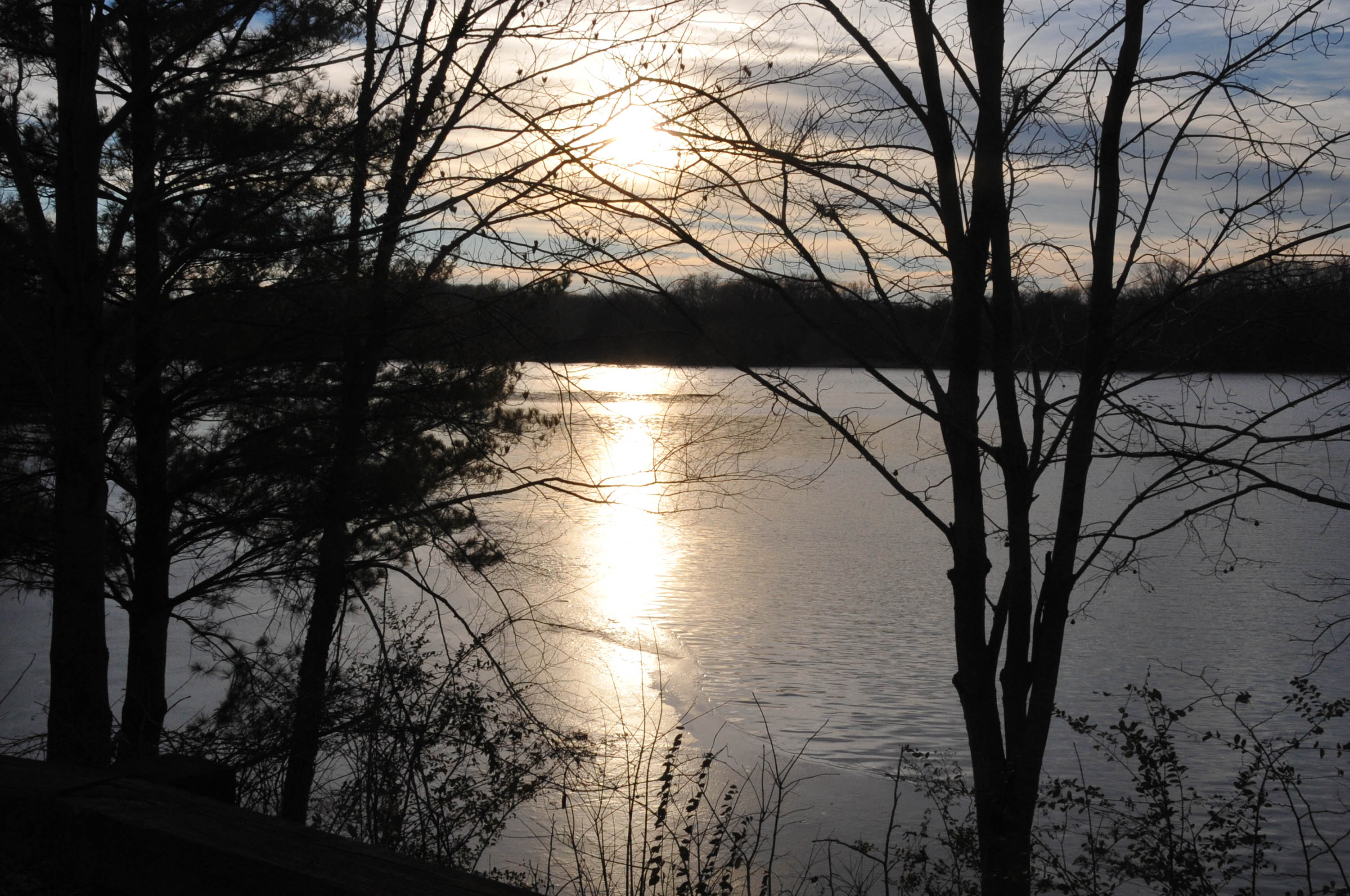
- Germantown Lake

- Location within Northern Virginia Location within Virginia Location within the United States
- Coordinates: 38°36′49″N 77°44′30″W
- Country: United States
- State: Virginia
- County: Fauquier
- Time zone: UTC−5 (Eastern (EST))
  - Summer (DST): UTC−4 (EDT)

- Germantown Archeological Sites
- U.S. National Register of Historic Places
- Location within Northern Virginia Location within Virginia Location within the United States
- Nearest city: Midland, Virginia
- Area: 32 acres (13 ha)
- NRHP reference No.: 82004555
- Added to NRHP: September 16, 1982

Germantown is a historic unincorporated rural community in Fauquier County, Virginia, United States. It is located in and around current-day C. M. Crockett Park, which contains the popular local fishing destination of Germantown Lake. Chief Justice John Marshall was born in Germantown. Archeological sites relating to the settlement are listed on the National Register of Historic Places.

== History ==
Many inhabitants from Germantown came from Germany, e.g. Siegen, east of Bonn. In 1718 twelve German emigrant families left the employ of Governor Alexander Spotswood and the mining settlement of Germanna for a 1,805-acre (7 km^{2}) parcel of land in modern southern Fauquier County. The parcel was divided equally between the settlers: Melchior Brombach, Joseph Coons, Harman Fishback, John Fishback, Peter Hitt, Jacob Holtzclaw, John Hoffman, John Kemper, John Joseph Martin, Jacob Rector, John Spilman, and Tillman Weaver. All the homes were built on the southern side of Licking Run which flowed through each farm.

Each landowner also donated 10 areas to form a glebe where the first church, parsonage, and school in Fauquier County were constructed. German Rolling Road was constructed by the settlers to enable them to reach the market of Falmouth. A saw mill and a grist mill also operated in the town. The mill pond lies under Germantown Lake, a 109 acres (44 ha) lake that was created in 1985, and which was named in honor of the settlement. This is where future Chief Justice of the Supreme Court of the United States John Marshall was born in 1755.

By the time of the American Revolution the prosperous settlers had all acquired other land and the settlement was defunct. Therefore, Germantown is sometimes called a lost German colony.

== Sources ==
- Germantown. Daine Gulick. The Memorial Foundation of the Germanna Colonies in Virginia, Inc.. Fauquier County Parks and Recreation. 1993.
- Marker
