= Death of Shedrick Thompson =

African American who was lynched in the U.S.

Shedrick Thompson was an African-American man from Fauquier County, Virginia, who was accused of crimes against his white employers in 1932. He was later found dead, hanging from a tree. Upon discovery, his body was mutilated and burned. While an official verdict declared it a suicide, others maintained that he was lynched. He was 39.

== Early life ==
Shedrick Thompson (also called "Shadrack", "Shadrock" and "Shadric" in some newspaper articles) grew up in Fauquier, the third of nine children born to Fannie and Merrington Thompson. In 1917 "he was drafted into the Army, trained in Arkansas, and shipped to France to serve with other 'colored' troops." He was honorably discharged, returned to Fauquier, married, and resumed his former life as a farmhand.

== Accusation of battery, robbery, and rape ==
His white next-door neighbors and employers, Henry and Mamie Baxley, claimed that on July 17, 1932, Thompson attacked them. They alleged Thompson beat Henry unconscious and took Mamie to a nearby field where he raped and beat her, as well as stealing her rings. Both Baxleys survived. Mrs. Baxley "said she believed the man harbored a grudge against her and her husband who had once given information that resulted in Thompson's imprisonment".

== Manhunt ==
Thompson fled into the mountains. The biggest manhunt in the county's history was launched, with posses, bloodhounds, a $250 reward announced on a flyer, and hundreds of volunteers, lasting for weeks. Two months later, his "badly decomposed" body was discovered hanging from a tree. "[A]uthorities expressed the opinion that Thompson had probably been dead five or six weeks."

Before the deputy sheriff arrived, a mob assembled and burned the body. They prevented the official from putting out the flames, sticking a pistol in his ribs and saying "let it burn". The mob removed Thompson's teeth as souvenirs.

== The official story ==
From the beginning, local and state officials denied that a lynching had taken place. In 1928, then-Governor Harry F. Byrd Sr. signed into law "the first effective anti-lynching law", the Virginia Anti-Lynching Law of 1928 (the Barron-Connor Act). Byrd was "the principal power behind the lynching act"; he believed that lynchings hurt the state economically by discouraging investment, and was trying to show that since states could handle the issue, federal legislation was unnecessary. (See Dyer Anti-Lynching Bill.) Byrd saw this law as a key achievement of his administration and claimed with pride that there had never been another lynching in Virginia. He had just been a candidate for the 1932 U.S. presidential nomination, was close to Roosevelt, was frequently mentioned as a possible cabinet appointee, and would soon be appointed, then elected Senator from Virginia. "Byrd's ascension to the national political stage was based in part on his reputation as the architect of the nation's strictest anti-lynching law."

Thus, local officials "resented" the NAACP's inclusion of Thompson in a list of 1932 lynchings, and "vigorously den[ied]" that he had been lynched. According to the sheriff there had been no lynching in Fauquier County within his memory, and it was an absolute case of suicide.

Byrd became personally involved, writing and having his friends write the NAACP, insisting that there had not been a lynching. The coroner "issued immediately a verdict of suicide," and said Thompson had committed suicide by putting a rope around his neck and jumping from an apple tree:

Why, it would be the simplest thing in the world. The tree had one limb running straight out about the size of my leg in diameter and another limb a bit higher running in almost the same direction. Thompson climbed the tree and sat out on the limb while he tied the slip noose around his neck, leaving about eighteen inches slack to break his neck in the fall. After fixing the knots the negro allowed himself to slip off the limb. That's all there was to it.

(The Commonwealth Attorney said Thompson jumped off a pile of rocks he had made, so as to break his own neck.) As soon as the coroner's verdict was published, "rumors began to circulate stating that the negro had been lynched by the angry mob that had been scouring through Rattlesnake Mountain the week following the negro's alleged attack and alleged escape, armed with knives, picks, shotguns, ropes, and mowing blades. One rumor even stated the date the lynching occurred and gave the number in the lynching party as six men…" The coroner said he paid no attention to these rumors, which were "bare lies".

A news story from nearby Martinsburg, West Virginia, where Thompson "at one time" resided, said that there was a bullet hole in his skull, and the body had been mutilated. Early reports said the body was burned before any law enforcement official arrived, and as said above, the first sheriff's deputy to arrive was threatened with a gun so he could not put the flames out. Yet the coroner said that a sheriff's deputy inspected the body before it was burned, and the stomach and abdomen were in "perfect condition so far as any signs of mutilation or beating was concerned". Furthermore, he said he had the skull in his possession...and after several examinations could find no sign of a bullet hole or any indication of rough treatment."

"The authorities' presumption that the man took his own life is not generally believed." Stories that Thompson had been hanged by a posse "gained so much credence" that a grand jury was impaneled; it also held that Thompson had committed suicide. "This verdict, however, failed to quiet and 'hush up' the case; ...several [local citizens] admitted after finding the body, that they had taken part in Thompson's lynching two months before."

As it was put by the Chicago Defender, an African-American newspaper, "'Suicide' Is Now Synonymous to 'Lynching' in Virginia".

== The Last Lynching in Northern Virginia ==
Retired Virginia reporter Jim Hall started investigating the Thompson case "because the official version of what happened...did not make sense" "He checked military records of Thompson and Baxley, who both served in the First World War, property deeds and land records, newspaper accounts, and personal diaries." He interviewed family and neighbors of both the Baxleys and Thompson. He "was shocked, as he read through Byrd's papers at the University of Virginia...[and] came to believe Byrd was motivated to 'protect his reputation ... not to get to the bottom' of what happened to Thompson." "The grand jury and the coroner...saw their job as protection of the status quo...and they did their duty to protect and shield the status quo from all the implications of a lynching verdict'". "Suicide didn't make any sense to anyone."

Hall's research led to a 2016 book, The Last Lynching in Northern Virginia: Seeking Truth at Rattlesnake Mountain (2016).

As a result of Hall's work, the Equal Justice Initiative added Thompson's name to its database of American lynchings. His name is one of the two names inscribed on Fauquier County's coffin-shaped pillar at the National Lynching Memorial (The National Memorial for Peace and Justice).

He calls the lynching of Shedrick Thompson "an open wound" in Fauquier County.

== The Other Side of Eden: Stories of a Virginia Lynching ==
Accompanying Hall during his on-site research and interviews was Tom Davenport, an independent filmmaker from Fauquier County. "Hall asked the questions, and Davenport filmed the interview over Hall's shoulder."

The result was a 59-minute documentary, The Other Side of Eden: Stories of a Virginia Lynching (2018), in which 5 separate people asserted that Thompson had been lynched, corroborating the stories of his castration and burning, and other torture.

== See also ==
- False accusations of rape as justification for lynchings
