= Halfway, Virginia =

Unincorporated community in Virginia, United States

- Unincorporated hamlet
- Location within Northern Virginia Location within Virginia Location within the United States
- Coordinates: 38°39′27″N 77°43′01″W
- Country: United States
- State: Virginia
- County: Fauquier
- Time zone: UTC−5 (Eastern (EST))
  - Summer (DST): UTC−4 (EDT)
- ZIP codes: 20198
- GNIS feature ID: 1495639

Halfway is an unincorporated hamlet in Fauquier County, Virginia, United States, running along State Route 626, known as Halfway Road. The village is named so for its equidistant location between the towns of Middleburg and The Plains. It is home to a local vineyard and winery, and carries The Plains' ZIP Code of 20198. Wide usage of Halfway is now quite uncommon, except by residents within neighboring towns. The area is usually considered to be part of The Plains, although a small sign still stands noting that the area is known as Halfway. The post office and general store no longer exist.
