= Bleek =

Bleek may mean:

- Dorothea Bleek (1873-1948), German anthropologist and philologist
- Friedrich Bleek (1793-1859), German biblical scholar
- Karl Theodor Bleek (1898-1969), German politician
- Wilhelm Bleek (1827-1875), German linguist
- Memphis Bleek or Bleek, stage name of New York rapper Malik Cox (born 1978)
- Bleek Gilliam, main character of the 1990 film Mo' Better Blues, played by Denzel Washington

== See also ==
- Bleak (disambiguation)
