= Timeline of Fauquier County, Virginia, in the American Civil War =

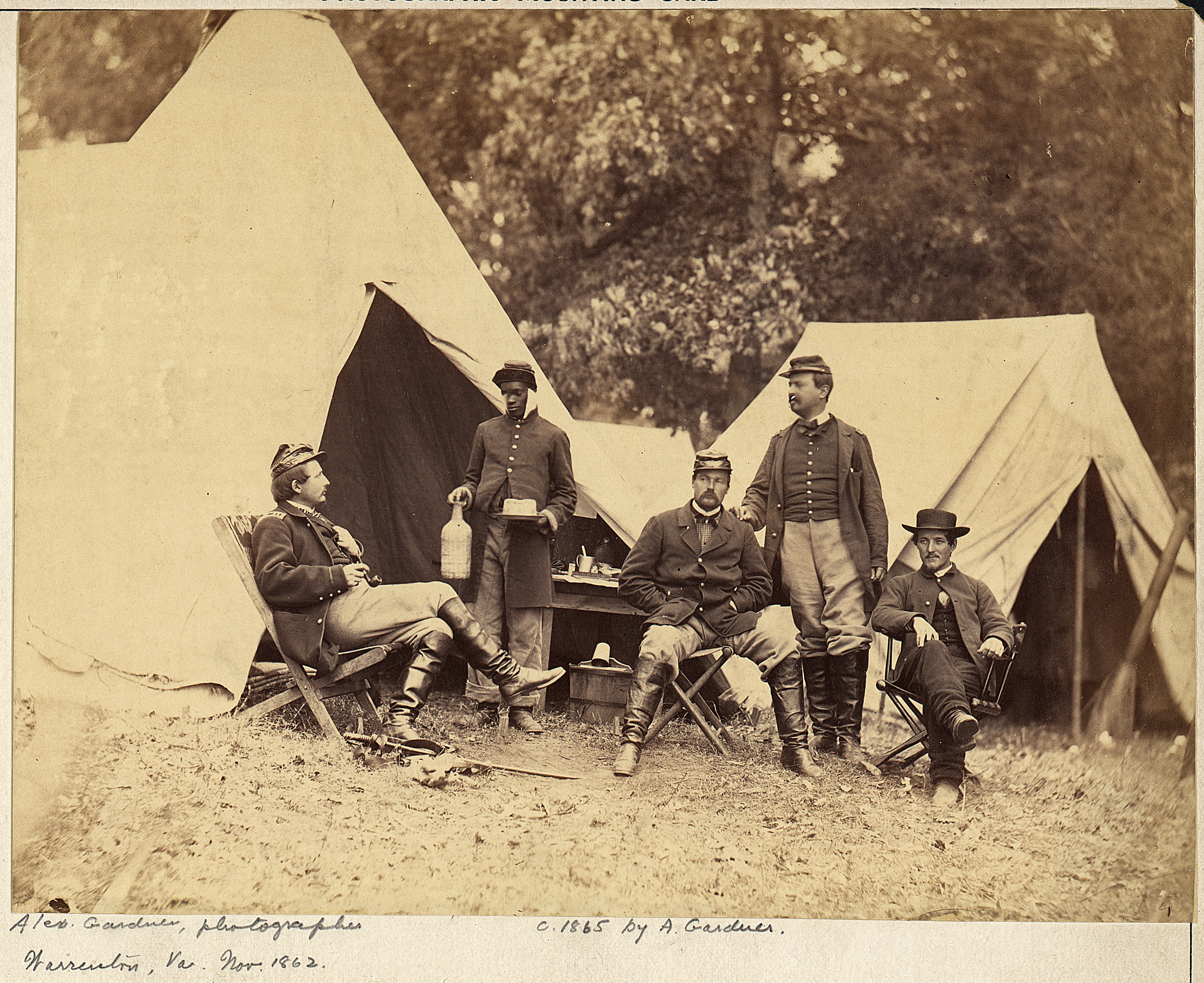
Warrenton, Fauquier County encampment, 1862

Timeline of Fauquier County, Virginia in the Civil War

Fauquier County was the site of many American Civil War battles. These battles included (in order) the First Battle of Rappahannock Station, the Battle of Thoroughfare Gap, the Battle of Kelly's Ford, the Battle of Aldie, the Battle of Middleburg, the Battle of Upperville, the First and Second Battle of Auburn, the Battle of Buckland Mills, and the Second Battle of Rappahannock Station.

== Pre War ==
- 1850 - Fauquier's population includes 10,352 enslaved individuals, 622 free African-Americans and 9,898 whites.
- 1852 - In Markham, Turner Ashby organizes the "Mountain Rangers" to police railroad workers who troubled farmers. The Rangers later become Co. A. 7th Va. Cavalry
- October 21, 1855 - Anthony Burns, a runaway and fugitive slave, is excommunicated from the Jesus Christ Church at Union in Fauquier. Burns is captured and returned only to be purchased by abolitionists a year later. He is relocated to Canada and dies a free man.
- 1857 - The Supreme Court's Dred Scott Decision establishes that no black person, slave or free could ever enjoy the rights of a U.S. citizen. It also declares the Missouri Compromise unconstitutional.
- Spring 1858 - The Black Horse Cavalry is formed. It eventually becomes Company H of the 4th Virginia Cavalry.
- October 16, 1859 - Dangerfield Newby, an ex-slave and former Fauquier resident, joins John Brown in his raid. Despite attempts to purchase and free them, Newby's wife and children are held in slavery in Warrenton by Jesse Jennings. Newby becomes the first of Brown's raiding party to be killed.
- October - December 1859 - The Mountain Rangers are assigned to picket duty after John Brown's raid on Harpers Ferry. Fauquier attorney Samual Chilton is appointed to defend Brown. He resigns when Brown refuses to plead insanity. The Black Horse Cavalry escorts Brown to the gallows. Fauquier physician Dr. Thomas Settle of Mount Bleak in Northern Fauquier pronounces John Brown dead.
- November 6, 1860 - Fauquier voters take to the polls in the presidential election and cast their votes as follows: John C. Breckinridge - 1,035 votes, John Bell - 988 votes, Stephen A. Douglas - 29 votes, and Abraham Lincoln - 1 vote (cast by Alexander Dixon of Vermont Farm).

== 1861 ==
- April 12 - Confederates under Gen. Pierre Beauregard open fire on Fort Sumter. The Civil War Begins.
- April 17 - The Fauquier delegates to the Virginia State convention, John Quincy Marr and Robert Eden Scott, vote with the majority to secede from the Union.
- May 23 - Fauquier citizens ratify Virginia's Ordinance of Secession by a margin of 1,809 to 4.
- June 1 - A skirmish at Fairfax Court House results in the death of Capt. John Quincy Marr of Warrenton - the first Confederate officer to die in the war. He is buried in the Warrenton Cemetery. His home still stands on Culpeper Street.
- July 19 - Gen Thomas J. "Stonewall" Jackson's troops board trains bound for Manassas at Piedmont Station (now Delaplane). This is the first time in history that trains are used to transport troops to battle. The train passes through Thoroughfare Gap.
- July 20 - Thomas H. Williamson, Chief Engineer of the Potomac Army requests that the counties of Fauquier, Culpeper and Orange provide 70 Free Negro or enslaved men each to provide labor to build fortifications along the Rappahannock River.
- July 21 - The Battle of Manassas forces the conversion of many Fauquier homes,schools and churches into makesfift hospitals and morgues.
- December - Surgeon Benjamin Black of Front Royal writes to J. M.C. Smith at the Warrenton Hospital, "If Negroes cannot be hired or pressed in the vicinity of Warrenton, you must see what can be done in the adjoining counties. Free Negroes not already in the service of the government will be pressed . . ."

== 1862 ==
- April - General Pope moves northeast through Warrenton to The Plains. As Pope's army passes through The Plains it passes the home of Dr. Clark who later writes, "I sat on my front porch with a stick in hand. I slyly cut a notch for every cannon that passed... I sent a courier, via Middleburg, across the Blue Ridge with a message to Jackson."
- April 10 - Upon the occupation of Warrenton by Federal troops under General Geary Mrs. Susan Caldwell notes, "On looking down the read you could see them coming as far as the eye could take in -- every lady was at her door . . . seeming anxious to see what the yankee soldiers were made of."
- May 3 - Former Fauquier delegate Robert Eden Scott is killed at Meadowville when several men try to capture two Union deserters accused of plundering north of Warrenton. There is a great outcry from the populace.
- June 6 - General Turner Ashby is killed at Chestnut Ridge near Harrisonburg. "As a partisan officer, I never knew his [Ashby's] surperior. His daring was proverbial, his powers of endurance almost incredible, his tone of character heroic, and his sagacity almost intuitive in divining the purposes of the enemy." - Gen. T. J. "Stonewall" Jackson
- August 19 - Union forces under General Pope retreat north from Culpeper through Fauquier County. Slaves seeking freedom move with the retreating army crossing the Rappahannock River along the way.
- August 21 - As they march toward what will become the Second Battle of Manasssas, many young Confederates pass Edward Turner's home, Kinlock Farm. Turner writes,

"How many now passing with careless hearts will 'ere another week be citizens of an unknown world? God have mercy on their noble souls. Our own dear boys may never return to their once peaceful and happy home. With fervent prayer we commend them to God who alone has the power to protect and save them."

- August 22–25 - First Battle of Rappahannock Station. Inclusive outcome. Pope attacks Jackson's troops at Sulphur Springs while McDowell attempts to cut off the Confederate withdrawal route at Rappahannock Station. 225 casualties.
- August 22–27
- August 22: The White Sulphur Springs Hotel is burned. It is unclear whether Union or Confederate forces are responsible.
- August 22–23: Preceding the Second Battle of Manassas, there are skirmishes at several crossings along the Rappahannock River. J.E.B. Stuart's troops destroy Union Gen. John Pope's supply train at Catlett's Station in Fauquier County.
- August 25–26: Stonewall Jackson leads his men through western Fauquier cutting a major Union supply line.
- August 27: Generals Robert E. Lee and James Longstreet are almost captured by Union Gen. John Buford's cavalry at Salem (Marshall).
- August 28 - Battle of Thoroughfare Gap. Confederate victory. Union troops try in vain to stop forces commanded by Lee and Longstreet from making their way through Thoroughfare Gap as they head east to Manassas. The wounded are taken to Chapman's/Beverly's Mill. 100 casualties.
- November 7–11 - McClellan relieved of command.
- November 7: In Orlean, General Burnside receives orders that he is to replace General McClellan as commander of the Army of the Potomac.
- November 8: McClellan is relieved of command while headquartered in Rectortown.
- November 11: McClellan bids farewell to his officers at the Warren Green Hotel in Warrenton.

== 1863 ==
- January 1 - The Emancipation Proclamation frees slaves in states in rebellion against the United States.
- March 17 - Battle of Kelly's Ford. Inconclusive outcome. Union General Averell's 2,100 cavalrymen raid at Kelly's Ford on the Rappahannock River. Averell secures the road between Rappahannock Station (Remington) and Kelly's Ford, but fails to destroy CSA Gen. Fitzhugh Lee's 800 man cavalry. Stuart's "Horse Artillery" commander John Pelham is killed. 211 casualties.
- May 22 - The Bureau of United States Colored Troops is established. At least 150 men born in Fauquier join various regiments of the USCT.
- June 9 - Battle of Brandy Station. Inconclusive outcome. Gen. Alfred Pleasonton initiates a cavalry attack from southern Fauquier upon Confederate cavalry concentrated in Culpeper County. Largest cavalry battle of the war. 1,447 casualties.
- June 10 - Mosby's Rangers are formalized as the 43rd Battalion Virginia Cavalry at Rector's Crossroads (Atoka).
- June 17 - Battle of Aldie. Inconclusive outcome. Pleasonton attempts to cross the Blue Ridge to determine where Lee is headed. Federal and Confederate forces push each other back and forth through Aldie as Stuart shields Lee's northward movement from Pleasonton. Stuart withdraws his men to Middleburg. 250 casualties.
- June 19 - Battle of Middleburg. Inconclusive outcome. Stuart continues to protect Lee's right flank by occupying the Blue Ridge passes. General Pleasonton pushes Stuart back more than a mile but fails to end his screening efforts. 390 casualties.
- June 21 - Battle of Upperville. Inconclusive outcome. In a series of clashes, Stuart's cavalry prevents Union forces from crossing the Blue Ridge and discovering Lee's movement toward Pennsylvania. 400 casualties.
- July 23 - Battle of Manassas Gap. Inconclusive outcome. General French is ordered to intercept Lee at Front Royal on his retreat from Gettysburg. The Third Corps is halted by Anderson's Division until Lee has passed through Front Royal on his way up the Shenandoah Valley. 440 casualties.
- July 25 - Skirmish at Barbee's Crossroads (Hume). Skirmish involving a portion of G.A. Custer's 5th Michigan Cavalry the day following the Battle of Newby's Crossroads.
- October 13–14 - First Battle of Auburn and Second Battle of Auburn. Inconclusive outcome. On the first day, General Stuart narrowly escapes capture. A skirmish on the second day turns into a battle. 163 casualties.
- October 19 - Battle of Buckland Mills. Confederate victory. General Stuart's cavalry turns at Buckland Mills after being chased down Warrenton Turnpike. Union troops including General Kilpatrick and General Custer flee. Also known as the "Buckland Races." 230 casualties.
- November 7 - Second Battle of Rappahannock Station. Union victory. Union General Meade successfully attacks Rappahannock River crossings at Kelly's Ford and Rappahannock Station (Remington). Lee falls back behind the Rapidan River. 2,537 casualties. After the battle, the Union army occupies the enemy headquarters which had been fitted for winter. "Hundreds of log huts had been built. They were covered with split shingles and each hut had a door, chimney and fireplace. In that part of the quarters assigned to our regiment, an order from Gen. Lee was found, instructing the men to erect these huts for winter quarters." - Regimental history of the 146th NY Volunteers.
- Winter 1863-1864 - Occupation of Warrenton. Union troops use crosses made to identify casualties from the Battles of Manassas as firewood. Citizens are confined to town to prevent their spying for Mosby.

== 1864 ==
- January 1 - Maj. Gen. William "Extra Billy" Smith, owner of the Monte Rosa estate in Warrenton is inaugurated for a second term as Governor of Virginia. He had previously served from 1846 to 1849.
- January 15 - The Herald prints that Union Provost Marshal Marsena Patrick doles out food to the people of Fauquier.
- April 13 - Union officer T. Baron von Michalowski writes the following to the Weaver and Horner women of Fauquier: "It is with great regret that I have to bid you goodbye. . . As Capt. Carpenter has said, we have met and we have parted, and I expect there is no remedy for Fate. One thing I can tell you though, whenever I think of Warrenton, I shall gratefully remember the many happy hours I have spent in your fine family. I shall ever recollect you as my best and truest friends . . . Though I do not belong to your side, I am sure you cannot find anyone who meant better and truer to you than I do." - T. Baron von Michalowski
- June 22 - Mosby limits where his men may travel when not on duty. The area, known as "Mosby's Confederacy," encompasses land from the Blue Ridge Mountains on the west to the Potomac River on the north and east and the Rapidan and Rappahannock Rivers on the south.
- September 26 - "Heartland," Joseph H. Blackwell's home at Piedmont Station (Delaplane), is burned as it has been reported that Mosby has one of his two headquarters there. Some of Mosby's personal effects are burned; and as the fire spreads, loud explosions are heard, indicating a small arsenal may have been stored there.
- October 4–9 - Colonel Mosby's raids hamper repair of the Manassas Gap Railroad. With two howitzers the Rangers fire upon Federals at the Railroad station at Marshall, chasing them to Rectortown. Mosby burns the station, tears up tracks and keeps the line closed until the end of the war.
- October 11 - Maj. Gen. Christopher C. Augur, at Rectortown, writes to Maj. Gen. H. W. Halleck, Secretary of War in an attempt to devise a plan to place prominent secessionists on trains. Halleck advises that the Southerners should be "so confined as to render escape impossible and yet exposed to the fire of the enemy."
- November 6 - Colonel Mosby holds a death lottery in Rectortown to determine which Federal prisoners to execute in retaliation for General Sheridan's execution of captured Confederates.
- November 28 - The Fauquier County Court requests a pardon from Confederate taxes. "The extent to which the property of the people has been despoiled can only be approximated. . . The devastated homesteads, the burnt mansions, fields once lowing with crops and alive with loving heads now wasted with violence, the woodlands stripped of their trees present an inadequate idea for the. . . real damage done to [our citizens]" - Fauquier County Circuit Court Minute Book.
- November 28 - December 2 - Union Gen. Philip Sheridan turns his attention to "Mosby's Confederacy." The "Burning Raid" sees the destruction of almost anything that could support Mosby and his guerillas.
- December 21 - Mosby is shot by Union troops at "Lakeland" near Rector's Crossroads (Atoka). Feigning death, Mosby tells a Union soldier that he is someone else. The soldiers leave him to die. He is hidden at various homes throughout Mosby's Confederacy while he recovers. He writes of the ordeal, "I overheard the soldiers ask Mrs. Skinner [Lankland resident and friend of Mosby] who I was. . . and I listened with fear and trembling for her answer. She declared that I was a stranger - that she had never seen me before..."

== 1865 ==
- January - Severe shortages of food and fodder in Fauquier and Loudoun Counties force half of Mosby's seven-company cavalry regiment to relocate to the Northern Neck of Virginia.
- February 8 - Despite the two feet of snow that covers the ground, over two hundred riders, including many of Mosby's men, participate in a massive fox hunt near Paris, Upperville, and Piedmont Station. Food is so scarce that foxes are now competing with humans for the remaining resources.
- March 3 - The Bureau of Refugees, Freedmen, and Abandoned Lands is created by Congress to assist Southerners in the transition from slavery to freedom. From 1865 to 1867, Fauquier utilizes the Bureau to supervise 169 labor contracts.
- April 9 - Lee surrenders to General Grant at the village of Appomattox Courthouse, VA. Grant allows Confederate officers to keep their side arms and permits soldiers to keep horses and mules.
- April - Members of the Black Horse gather at Fauquier Springs. The group decides to head to North Carolina to join Johnston's army, but receive news that Johnston has surrendered.
- April 21 - Col. John S. Mosby, refusing to surrender, disbands his Rangers in a field near Marshall.
- May - Remaining Confederate forces surrender. The Civil War ends.

== Post-war ==
- December 6, 1865 - The 13th Amendment to the Constitution is ratified. Slavery is officially abolished in the U.S.
- March 15, 1866 - Stones are thrown into Miss Fannie Wood's school for freedmen. Those responsible are to be punished and Miss Wood may request protection as needed.
- November 30, 1867 - John S. Mosby establishes his law practice in Warrenton. He will attend to bankruptcy and real estate cases in Fauquier, Loudoun, Prince William and Fairfax Counties.
- 1871 - 1873 - The Southern Claims Commission, whose purpose is to reimburse Union sympathizers for property losses due to the U.S. Army, processes 212 claims in Fauquier. Of these, 61 claims are approved and 151 are disallowed.
- April 1873 - The Memorial Association requests funds from the Warrenton town council for removal of the now unnamed Confederate dead to a common grave. By November of the same year, the unknown soldiers have been reinterred.
- June 1876 - Alderman James V. Brookes moves for a committee of five to solicit funds to complete a memorial monument to Warrenton's unknown Confederate dead.
- May 1877 - Gen. Wade Hampton of South Carolina gives a dedicatory address at the unveiling of Warrenton's Confederate memorial. "Dedicated with reverence, with love, and with solemn prayer to the martyred dead of a fallen but still a just and righteous cause."
- 1877 - As Mosby steps off of a train at the Warrenton Depot someone takes a shot at him. He had become a Republican, and would later note, "Hell is being a Republican in Virginia."
- 1895 - In Alexandria, Mosby attends the first reunion of his Rangers, which is the only reunion that he will ever attend.
- 1998 - Shortly after the names of 520 of Warrenton's unknown Confederate dead are found, a memorial wall naming the fallen is erected around the extant monument."
