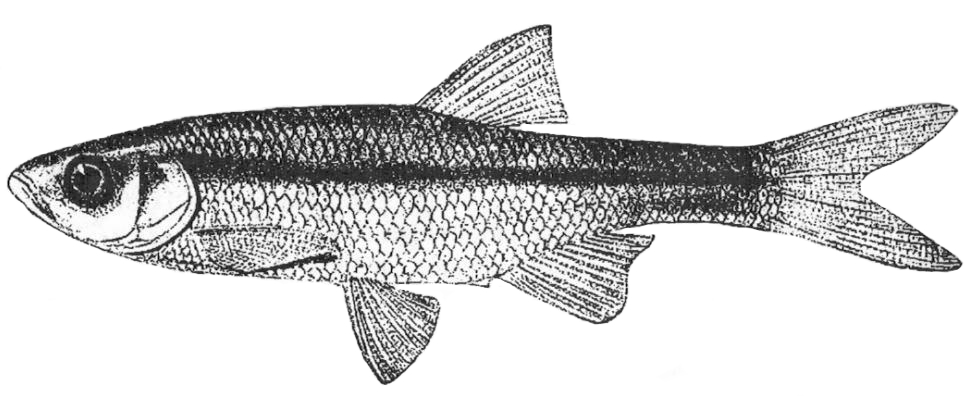

Scientific classification
- Domain: Eukaryota
- Kingdom: Animalia
- Phylum: Chordata
- Class: Actinopterygii
- Order: Cypriniformes
- Family: Leuciscidae
- Subfamily: Leuciscinae
- Genus: Alburnoides
- Species: A. oblongus

Binomial name
- Alburnoides oblongus Bulgakov, 1923

= Tashkent riffle bleak =

Species of fish

The Tashkent riffle bleak (Alburnoides oblongus) is a fish species of family Cyprinidae. Widespread in the Central Asia in Syr-Darya basin. Benthopelagic temperate freshwater fish, up to 14.2 cm in length.
