= Liberty, Caroline County, Virginia =

Unincorporated community in Virginia, United States

Coordinates: 38°08′36″N 77°21′12″W

Liberty is an unincorporated community in Caroline County, in the U.S. state of Virginia.
