= Midland, Virginia =

- CDP
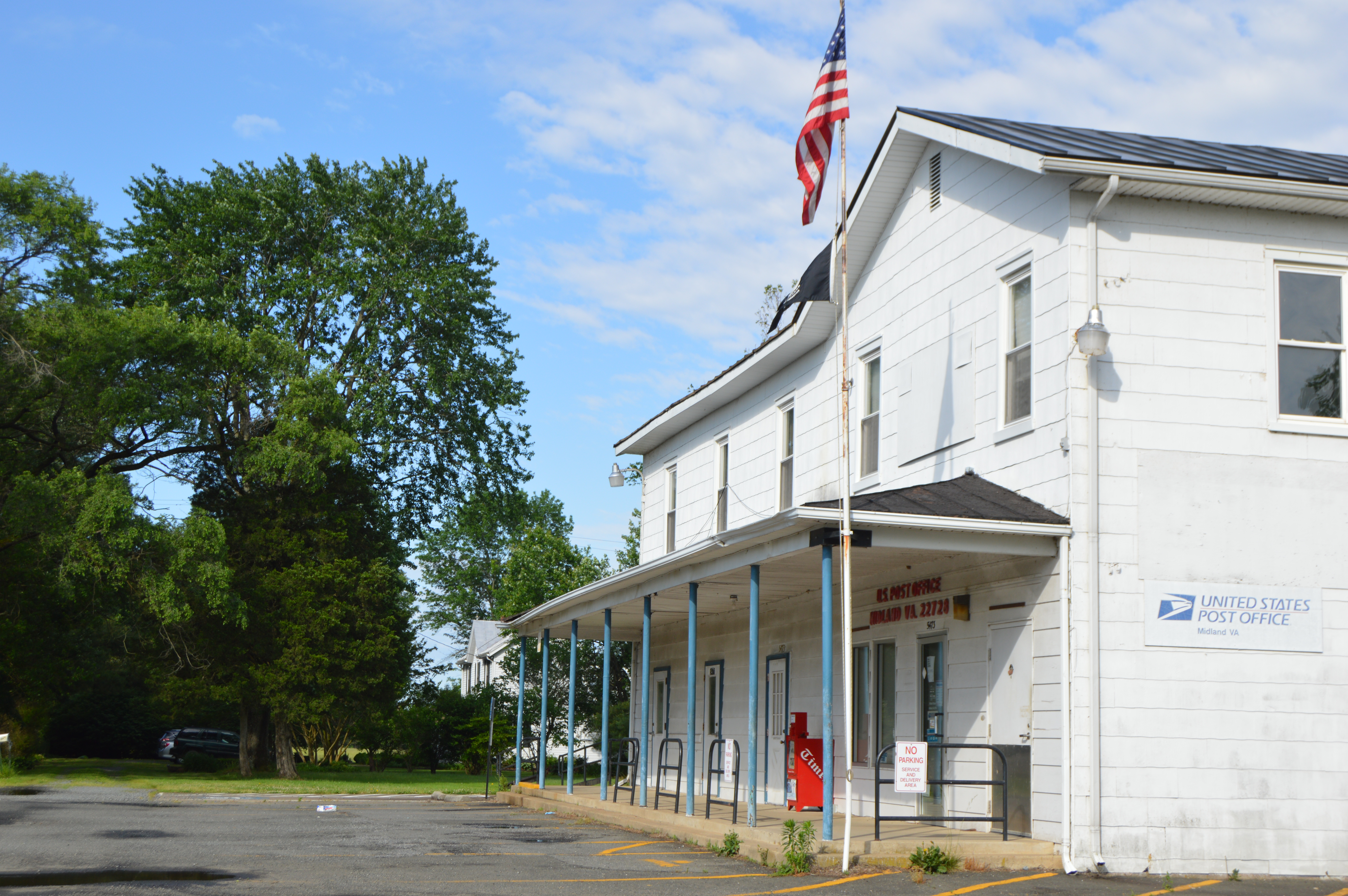
- Post office on Midland Road

- Location within Northern Virginia Location within Virginia Location within the United States
- Coordinates: 38°35′58″N 77°43′28″W
- Country: United States
- State: Virginia
- County: Fauquier

Area
  - Total: 4.05 sq mi (10.49 km^{2})
  - Land: 4.04 sq mi (10.47 km^{2})
  - Water: 0.0077 sq mi (0.02 km^{2})
- Elevation: 327 ft (100 m)

Population (2010)
  - Total: 214
  - Density: 54/sq mi (20.8/km^{2})
- Time zone: UTC−5 (Eastern (EST))
  - Summer (DST): UTC−4 (EDT)
- ZIP code: 22728
- FIPS code: 51-51544
- GNIS feature ID: 1495941

Midland is a census-designated place (CDP) in Fauquier County, Virginia, United States. As of the 2020 census, Midland had a population of 214. Midland is home to a post office with the local ZIP code of 22728.

Midland is the closest community to the birthplace of John Marshall, the longest-serving Chief Justice in U.S. Supreme Court history. A small park honors his birthplace, with a marker placed where his home once stood. The county is also designated as part of the John Marshall Soil and Water Conservation District.

== Geography ==
Midland is in southern Fauquier County along State Route 28, northeast of Bealeton and southwest of Calverton. Warrenton, the Fauquier County seat, is 11 miles (18 km) to the north. According to the U.S. Census Bureau, the CDP has a total area of 4.1 square miles (10.5 km^{2}), of which 0.01 square miles (0.02 km^{2}), or 0.20%, is water.

The Warrenton–Fauquier Airport is situated in Midland. Ross Industries is a company that has its headquarters in Midland. Smith-Midland Corporation, formerly Smith Cattleguard Company, was founded in Midland in 1960. It has been one of the largest employers in Fauquier County since the 1980’s. Smith-Midland is a manufacturer of precast concrete products.

C. M. Crockett Park is located just north of Midland. It has Germantown Lake and the archeological sites of Germantown. The park has many facilities available to the public and is often used for county-wide events.

== Demographics ==
Historical population
Census	Pop.	Note	%±
2010	218		—
2020	214		−1.8%
U.S. Decennial Census; 2010 2020

Midland was first listed as a census designated place in the 2010 U.S. census.
