= Fauquier County, Virginia =

County in Virginia, United States

- County
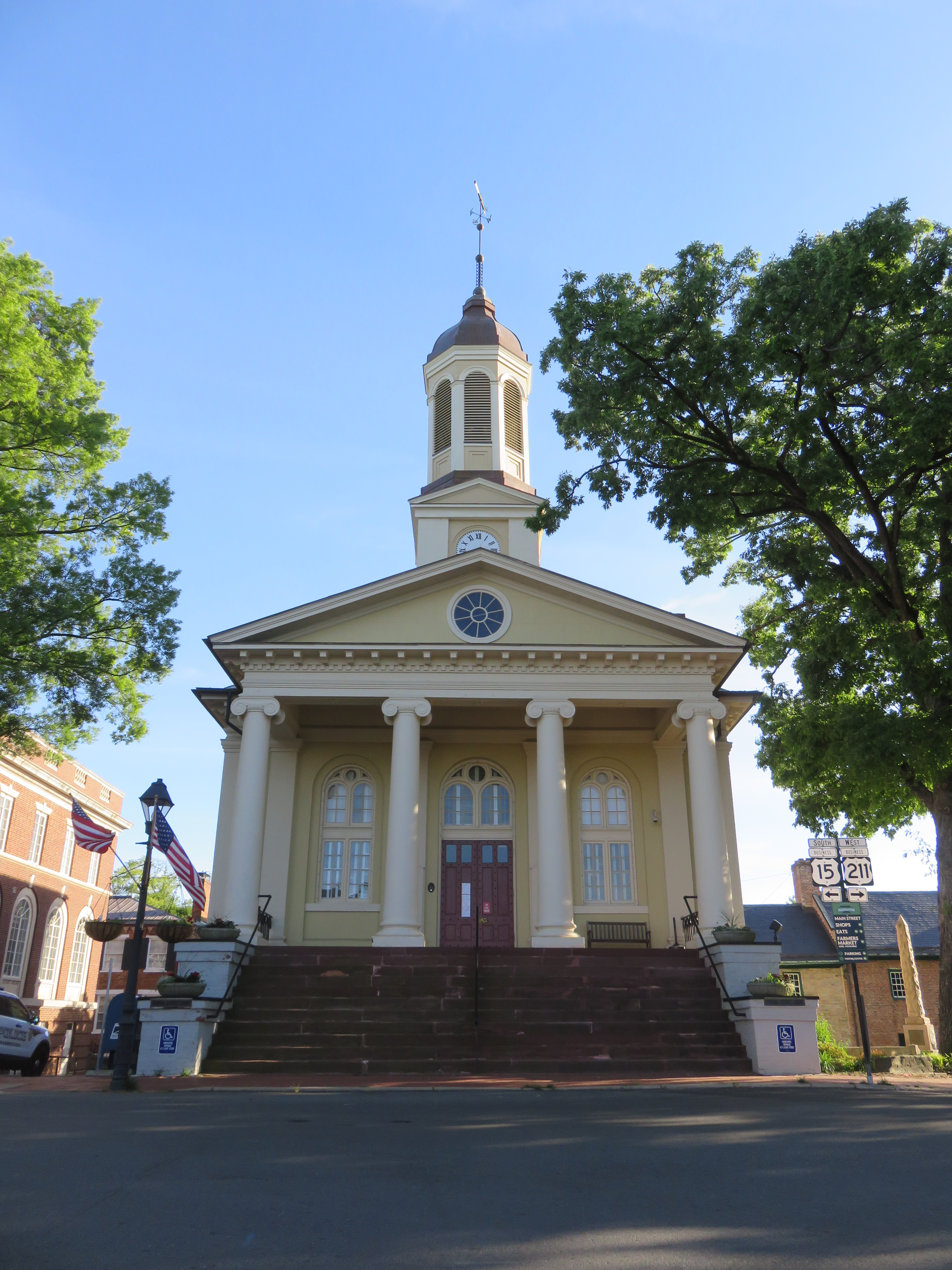
- Fauquier County Courthouse in Warrenton

- Flag Seal

- Location within the U.S. state of Virginia
- Coordinates: 38°44′N 77°49′W
- Country: United States
- State: Virginia
- Founded: 1759
- Named for: Francis Fauquier
- Seat: Warrenton
- Largest community: New Baltimore

Area
  - Total: 651 sq mi (1,690 km^{2})
  - Land: 647 sq mi (1,680 km^{2})
  - Water: 3.8 sq mi (9.8 km^{2}) 0.6%

Population (2020)
  - Total: 72,972
  - Estimate (2025): 76,503 ▲
  - Density: 113/sq mi (43.5/km^{2})
- Time zone: UTC−5 (Eastern)
  - Summer (DST): UTC−4 (EDT)
- Congressional district: 10th
- Website: www.fauquiercounty.gov

Fauquier County /fɔːˈkɪər/ is a United States county located on the Piedmont plateau of the Commonwealth of Virginia. Part of the Northern Virginia region, Fauquier is included in the Washington metropolitan area. As of the 2020 census, the county population was 72,972. The county seat is the large historic town of Warrenton.

The county was created in 1759 from part of Prince William County and was named in honor of Francis Fauquier, the administrative head of Virginia Colony at the time. Fauquier hosts the Virginia Gold Cup, which, having started in 1922, is one of the longest running steeplechase horse race events in the United States.

== History ==
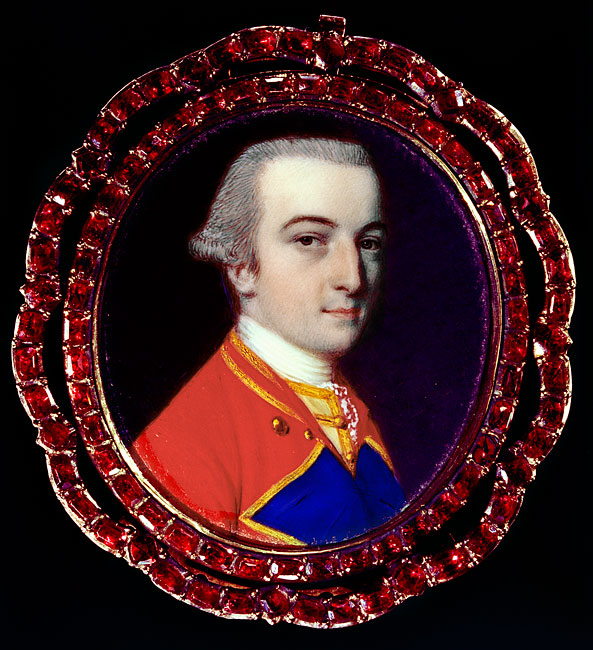
Portrait of Francis Fauquier, for whom Fauquier County was named

In 1608, the first European to explore in the vicinity, Captain John Smith, reported that the Whonkentia (a subgroup of the Siouan-speaking Manahoac tribe) inhabited the area. The Manahoac were forced out around 1670 by the Iroquois (Seneca), who did not resettle the area. The Conoy camped briefly near The Plains, from 1697 to 1699. The Six Nations ceded the entire region including modern Fauquier to Virginia Colony at the Treaty of Albany, in 1722.

Fauquier County was established on May 1, 1759, from Prince William County. It is named for Francis Fauquier, Lieutenant Governor of Virginia at the time, who won the land in a poker game, according to legend.

American Civil War battles in Fauquier County included (in order) the First Battle of Rappahannock Station, the Battle of Thoroughfare Gap, the Battle of Kelly's Ford, the Battle of Aldie, the Battle of Middleburg, the Battle of Upperville, the First and Second Battle of Auburn, the Battle of Buckland Mills, and the Second Battle of Rappahannock Station.

== Geography ==
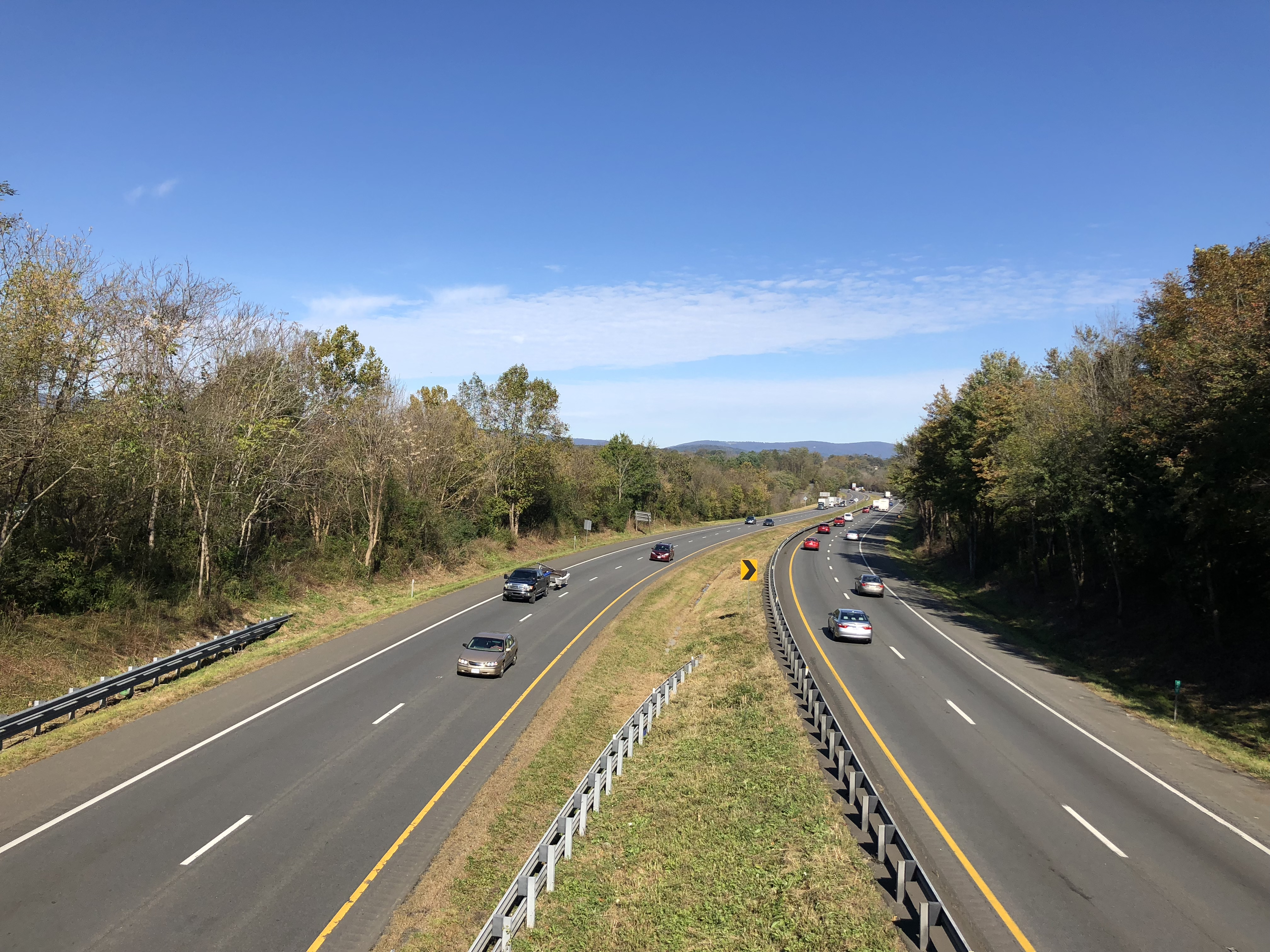
View west along I-66/SR 55 and north along US 17 in northwestern Fauquier County

Fauquier and adjacent counties

According to the U.S. Census Bureau, the county has an area of 651 square miles (1,690 km^{2}), of which 647 square miles (1,680 km^{2}) is land and 3.8 square miles (9.8 km^{2}) (0.6%) is water.

Fauquier County is not densely populated, but exurban development from Washington, DC has sprung up in some parts. Even in rural areas, housing complexes can be seen along highways. The highest point by elevation is Blue Mountain at 2,208 ft (673 meters) on the county's northwestern border with Warren County.

=== Adjacent counties ===
- Clarke County (north)
- Loudoun County (north)
- Prince William County (east)
- Stafford County (southeast)
- Culpeper County (southwest)
- Rappahannock County (west)
- Warren County (northwest)

=== Major highways ===
- I-66
- US 15
- US 17
- US 29
- US 50
- US 211
- SR 28
- SR 55
- SR 215
- SR 245
- SR 355

== Demographics ==
Historical population
Census	Pop.	Note	%±
1790	17,892		—
1800	21,329		19.2%
1810	22,689		6.4%
1820	23,103		1.8%
1830	26,086		12.9%
1840	21,897		−16.1%
1850	20,868		−4.7%
1860	21,706		4.0%
1870	19,690		−9.3%
1880	22,993		16.8%
1890	22,590		−1.8%
1900	23,374		3.5%
1910	22,526		−3.6%
1920	21,869		−2.9%
1930	21,071		−3.6%
1940	21,039		−0.2%
1950	21,248		1.0%
1960	24,066		13.3%
1970	26,375		9.6%
1980	35,889		36.1%
1990	48,741		35.8%
2000	55,139		13.1%
2010	65,203		18.3%
2020	72,972		11.9%
2025 (est.)	76,503	▲	4.8%
U.S. Decennial Census; 1790–1960 1900–1990; 1990–2000 2010 2020

=== Racial and ethnic composition ===
Fauquier County, Virginia – Racial and ethnic composition Note: the US Census treats Hispanic/Latino as an ethnic category. This table excludes Latinos from the racial categories and assigns them to a separate category. Hispanics/Latinos may be of any race.
Race / Ethnicity (NH = Non-Hispanic)	Pop 1980	Pop 1990	Pop 2000	Pop 2010	Pop 2020	% 1980	% 1990	% 2000	% 2010	% 2020
White alone (NH)	29,836	42,291	48,064	53,410	54,969	83.13%	86.77%	87.17%	81.91%	75.33%
Black or African American alone (NH)	5,579	5,425	4,801	5,232	4,999	15.55%	11.13%	8.71%	8.02%	6.85%
Native American or Alaska Native alone (NH)	43	109	132	186	128	0.12%	0.22%	0.24%	0.29%	0.18%
Asian alone (NH)	122	289	318	826	1,204	0.34%	0.59%	0.58%	1.27%	1.65%
Native Hawaiian or Pacific Islander alone (NH)	x	x	17	27	49	x	x	0.03%	0.04%	0.07%
Other race alone (NH)	50	25	67	103	339	0.14%	0.05%	0.12%	0.16%	0.46%
Mixed race or Multiracial (NH)	x	x	626	1,241	3,491	x	x	1.14%	1.90%	4.78%
Hispanic or Latino (any race)	259	602	1,114	4,178	7,793	0.72%	1.24%	2.02%	6.41%	10.68%
Total	35,889	48,741	55,139	65,203	72,972	100.00%	100.00%	100.00%	100.00%	100.00%

=== 2020 census ===
As of the 2020 census, the county had a population of 72,972. The median age was 41.9 years. 23.1% of residents were under the age of 18 and 17.1% of residents were 65 years of age or older. For every 100 females there were 97.8 males, and for every 100 females age 18 and over there were 95.6 males age 18 and over.

The racial makeup of the county was 77.6% White, 7.0% Black or African American, 0.4% American Indian and Alaska Native, 1.7% Asian, 0.1% Native Hawaiian and Pacific Islander, 4.3% from some other race, and 8.8% from two or more races. Hispanic or Latino residents of any race comprised 10.7% of the population.

42.5% of residents lived in urban areas, while 57.5% lived in rural areas.

There were 26,400 households in the county, of which 33.2% had children under the age of 18 living with them and 21.1% had a female householder with no spouse or partner present. About 21.2% of all households were made up of individuals and 10.3% had someone living alone who was 65 years of age or older.

There were 28,249 housing units, of which 6.5% were vacant. Among occupied housing units, 79.7% were owner-occupied and 20.3% were renter-occupied. The homeowner vacancy rate was 1.3% and the rental vacancy rate was 4.7%.

=== 2000 Census ===
In 2000, there were 19,842 households, out of which 36.10% had children under the age of 18 living with them, 63.80% were married couples living together, 8.60% had a female householder with no husband present, and 23.70% were non-families. 18.70% of all households were made up of individuals, and 6.20% had someone living alone who was 65 years of age or older. The average household size was 2.75 and the average family size was 3.14.

In 2013, 24.2% of the population was under the age of 18, 6.40% was from 18 to 24, 30.30% from 25 to 44, 26.00% from 45 to 64, and 14.4% was 65 years of age or older. The median age was 38 years. For every 100 females, there were 98.8 males. For every 100 females aged 18 and over, there were 95.4 males.

The median income for a household in the county was $93,762. The per capita income for the county was $39,600. About 3.70% of families and 5.60% of the population were below the poverty line, including 4.70% of those under age 18 and 8.70% of those age 65 or over.

The county is exurban. There has been increased growth in Warrenton and New Baltimore in recent years. The subdivisions of Brookside and Vint Hill have facilitated the growth in the eastern part of the county. There is some industry in Fauquier County, however the largest employer in the county is the county government and the hospital. As of the 2000 census, 47% of county residents that work have jobs that are outside the county. The average travel time to work is 39.2 minutes.

== Government ==
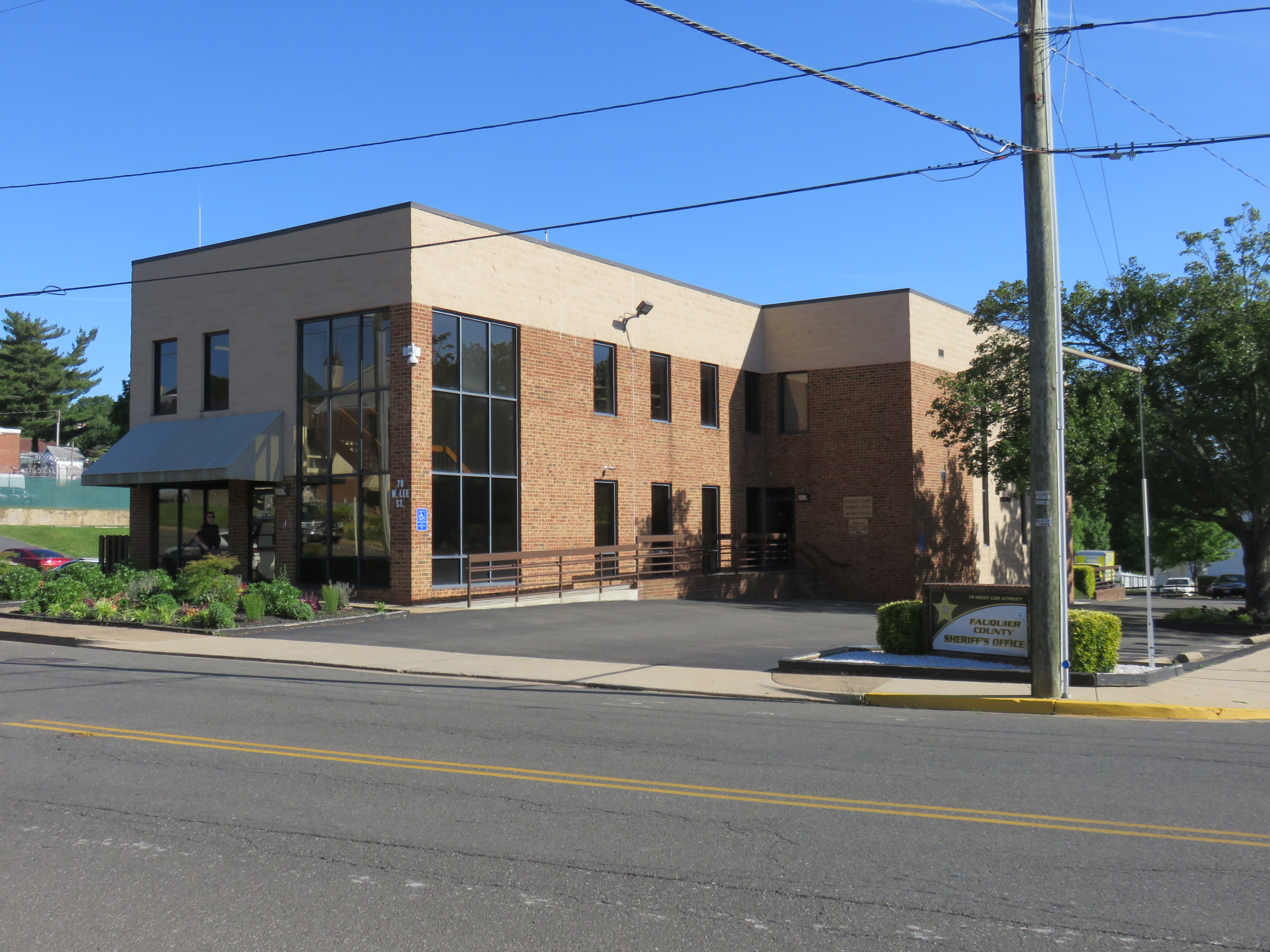
Sheriff's Office headquarters in Warrenton

=== Board of Supervisors ===
- Cedar Run District: Richard Gerhardt (R) – Chairman
- Center District: Kevin T. Carter (R) - Vice Chairman
- Lee District: Daron Culbertson (R)
- Marshall District: Regan Washer (R)
- Scott District: Edwin W. "Ike" Broaddus (I)

=== Constitutional officers ===
- Clerk of the Circuit Court: Gail H. Barb (R)
- Commissioner of the Revenue: Eric Maybach (R)
- Commonwealth's Attorney: Scott C. Hook (R)
- Sheriff: Jeremy A. Falls (R)
- Treasurer: Tanya Remson Wilcox (R)

=== Legislators ===
The Virginia Senate:

- Bryce Reeves (R)

The Virginia House of Delegates:

- Michael J. Webert (R)
- Geary Higgins (R)

The U.S. House of Representatives:

- Suhas Subramanyam (D)

=== Law enforcement ===
The Fauquier County Sheriff's Office is the primary law enforcement agency in Fauquier County, Virginia. Its headquarters are in Warrenton. It supports the Warrenton Training Center, a CIA site in Warrenton.

Warrenton and Remington have their own police departments.

== Politics ==
Since 1952, Fauquier County has voted for the Republican Party in all but one presidential election.

United States presidential election results for Fauquier County, Virginia
Year	Republican		Democratic		Third party(ies)	
Year	No.	%	No.	%	No.	%
1912	182	12.46%	1,187	81.25%	92	6.30%
1916	367	23.32%	1,204	76.49%	3	0.19%
1920	568	29.26%	1,365	70.32%	8	0.41%
1924	345	20.14%	1,277	74.55%	91	5.31%
1928	972	38.83%	1,531	61.17%	0	0.00%
1932	379	15.82%	1,999	83.43%	18	0.75%
1936	629	23.54%	2,037	76.24%	6	0.22%
1940	756	28.67%	1,874	71.07%	7	0.27%
1944	1,089	33.99%	2,110	65.86%	5	0.16%
1948	1,102	41.32%	1,291	48.41%	274	10.27%
1952	2,068	56.27%	1,597	43.46%	10	0.27%
1956	2,112	55.55%	1,567	41.22%	123	3.24%
1960	2,123	51.86%	1,958	47.83%	13	0.32%
1964	2,101	37.43%	3,506	62.46%	6	0.11%
1968	2,845	43.76%	2,099	32.29%	1,557	23.95%
1972	4,654	67.71%	2,039	29.67%	180	2.62%
1976	4,715	51.75%	4,002	43.92%	394	4.32%
1980	6,782	58.11%	4,119	35.30%	769	6.59%
1984	10,319	71.41%	4,056	28.07%	76	0.53%
1988	11,733	69.86%	4,837	28.80%	226	1.35%
1992	10,497	50.57%	6,600	31.79%	3,662	17.64%
1996	11,063	57.45%	6,759	35.10%	1,436	7.46%
2000	14,456	61.56%	8,296	35.33%	729	3.10%
2004	19,011	63.55%	10,712	35.81%	192	0.64%
2008	19,227	56.19%	14,616	42.71%	376	1.10%
2012	21,034	59.16%	13,965	39.28%	556	1.56%
2016	22,127	59.06%	12,971	34.62%	2,369	6.32%
2020	25,106	57.50%	17,565	40.23%	990	2.27%
2024	26,825	59.92%	17,180	38.38%	763	1.70%

== Education ==
=== K-12 schools ===
Most of the county is in the Fauquier County Public Schools school division. The portion on Marine Corps Base Quantico is within the Department of Defense Education Activity (DoDEA) school district.

Fauquier County Public Schools facilities include:

Elementary schools

- C. M. Bradley Elementary School
- James G. Brumfield Elementary School
- W. G. Coleman Elementary School
- Grace Miller Elementary School
- H. M. Pearson Elementary School
- C. Hunter Ritchie Elementary School
- P. B. Smith Elementary School
- Claude Thompson Elementary School
- Mary Walter Elementary School
- Greenville Elementary School
- M. M. Pierce Elementary School

Middle schools

- Auburn Middle School
- Cedar Lee Middle School
- W. C. Taylor Middle School
- Marshall Middle School

High schools

- Fauquier High School
- Liberty High School
- Southeastern Alternative School
- Kettle Run High School
- Mountain Vista Governor's School

The zoned schools for areas on-post at MCB Quantico are Crossroads Elementary School and Quantico Middle/High School.

Private schools

- Fresta Valley Christian School
- Highland School
- St. John The Evangelist Catholic School
- Wakefield School

=== Higher education ===
- Laurel Ridge Community College
- Thorpe House Adult Learning Center

== Economy ==
=== Top employers ===
According to the county's 2023 Comprehensive Annual Financial Report, the county's largest employers are:

Rank	Employer	Number of Employees
1	Fauquier County School Board	1,000 and over
2	County of Fauquier	500 to 999
3	Fauquier Health System	500 to 999
4	United States Department of Transportation	500 to 999
5	Walmart	250 to 499
6	Town of Warrenton	100 to 249
7	Food Lion	100 to 249
8	White Horse OPCO LLC	100 to 249
9	The Home Depot	100 to 249
10	Blue Ridge Orthopedic Associates	100 to 249

== Communities ==
=== Towns ===
- Remington
- The Plains
- Warrenton (county seat)

=== Census-designated places ===
- Bealeton
- Calverton
- Catlett
- Marshall
- Midland
- New Baltimore
- Opal
- Paris
- Rectortown
- Upperville

=== Other unincorporated communities ===
- Airlie
- Atoka
- Belle Meade
- Belvoir
- Bleak
- Bristersburg
- Broad Run
- Casanova
- Delaplane
- Elk Run
- Germantown
- Goldvein
- Halfway
- Hume
- Liberty
- Linden
- Markham
- Morrisville
- Old Tavern
- Orlean
- Somerville
- Sumerduck

== Notable people ==
- James Markham Ambler, naval surgeon
- Turner Ashby, born in Fauquier County, Confederate Army colonel in the American Civil War.
- Martin Berkofsky, classical pianist and philanthropist.
- Matt Carson, entrepreneur and author
- Irv Cross, American footballer and sportscaster.
- Susan Cummings, an heiress infamous for killing Argentine polo player Roberto Villegas.
- Robert Duvall, actor. He maintained a farm in The Plains.
- Bertram and Diana Firestone, owners of Newstead Farm.
- George B. Fitch, businessman, Mayor of Warrenton, founder of Jamaican Bobsled Team.
- Rear Admiral Cary Travers Grayson, owner of historic Blue Ridge Farm.
- Eppa Hunton, U.S. Representative and Senator from Virginia, born and lived in Warrenton.
- Sandy Lerner, Cisco founder who maintains a farm in Upperville.
- Charles Marshall, born in Warrenton, assistant adjutant general, aide de camp and military secretary to Gen. Robert E. Lee. Grandnephew of Chief Justice John Marshall.
- James K. Marshall, Colonel in the Confederate States Army, killed in action during Pickett's Charge at the Battle of Gettysburg while leading the brigade of J. Johnston Pettigrew, grandson of Chief Justice John Marshall.
- John Marshall, born in Fauquier County, Chief Justice of the United States.
- Paul Mellon, philanthropist, an Exemplar of Racing and owner of Rokeby Farm.
- John S. Mosby, lived in Warrenton, was a Confederate partisan ranger and cavalry officer during the American Civil War. Buried in Warrenton cemetery.
- Presley O'Bannon, of the First Barbary War, born in Fauquier County
- Karen O'Connor and David O'Connor, Olympic eventing riders
- Dorothy B. Porter, bibliographer and curator, built the Moorland-Spingarn Research Center at Howard University
- Albert Rust, 19th-century politician who served as a senior officer of the Confederate States Army during the American Civil War (1861–1865).
- Michaele Salahi and Tareq Salahi, the White House Gate Crashers.
- Willard Scott, media personality best known for his work on NBC's The Today Show who lived in Paris, Virginia.
- Scott Shipp, born in Warrenton, Superintendent of Virginia Military Institute from 1890 to 1907.
- Isabel Dodge Sloane, owner of Brookmeade Stud.
- William "Extra Billy" Smith, died in Warrenton, was a lawyer, congressman, two-time Governor of Virginia and one of the oldest Confederate generals in the American Civil War.
- Shedrick Thompson, lynching victim
- Liz Whitney Tippett, owner of the Llangollen estate.
- William B. Waddell (Pony Express founder), Pony Express founder

== See also ==
- Fauquier County Sheriff's Office
- National Register of Historic Places listings in Fauquier County, Virginia
- Timeline of Fauquier County, Virginia in the Civil War
- Fauquier, British Columbia
