= Liberty, Halifax County, Virginia =

Unincorporated community in Virginia, United States

Coordinates: 36°53′4″N 78°58′29″W

Liberty is an unincorporated community in Halifax County, Virginia, United States, near Nathalie. It lies at an elevation of 680 feet (186 m).
