= Great Meadow (events center) =

Steeplechase course in Plains, Virginia

Coordinates: 38°49′45″N 77°48′32″W

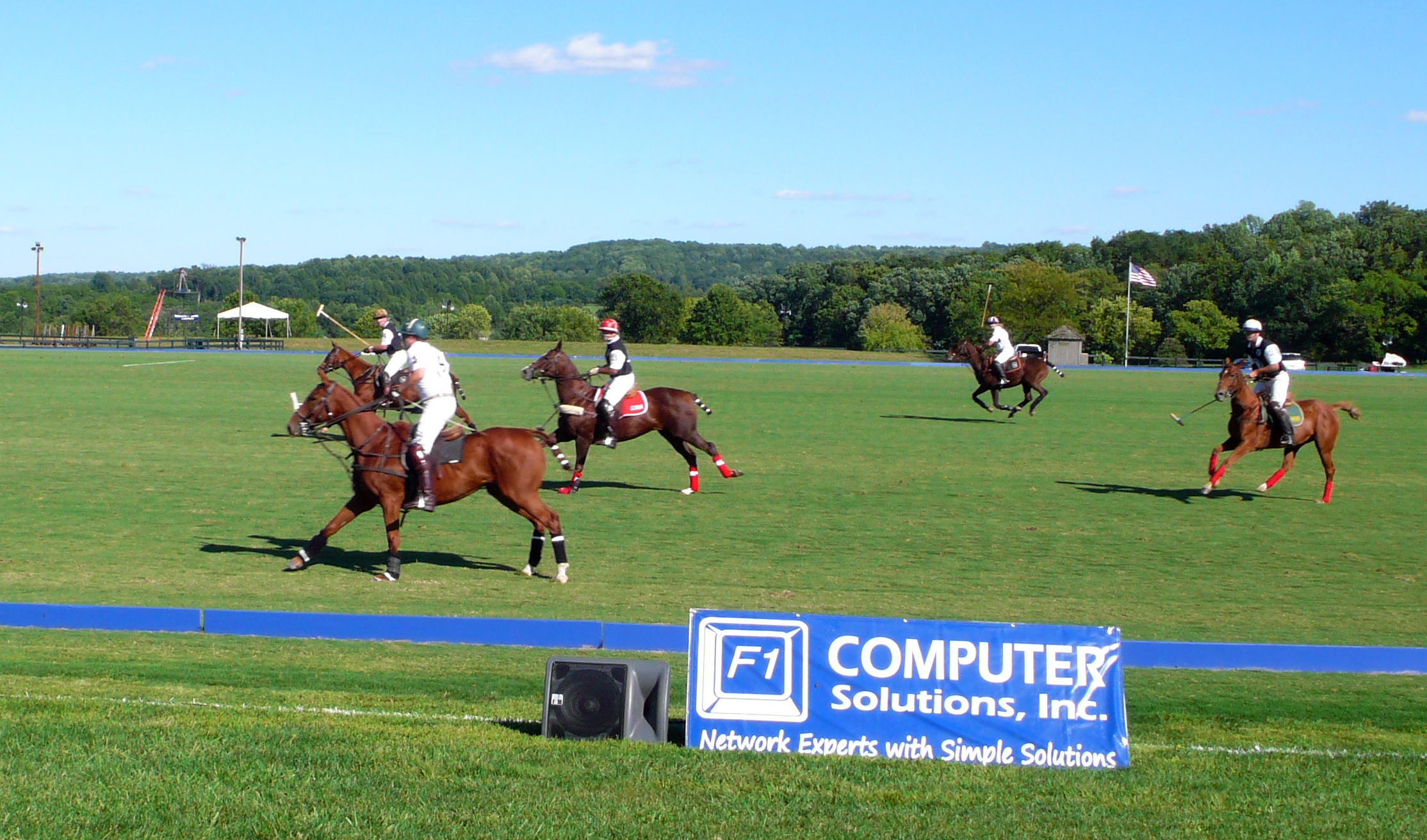
Polo match at Great Meadow in 2007

Great Meadow is a 380-acre (1.5 km^{2}) field events center and steeplechase course located in The Plains, Virginia. It is operated under the stewardship of the Great Meadow Foundation, a 501(c)(3) non-profit organization dedicated to the preservation of open space for community use.

Great Meadow and the Great Meadow Foundation were founded and the land donated by news executive and philanthropist Arthur W. Arundel in 1982, when the Virginia Gold Cup lost its lease on Broadview Race Course in Warrenton, VA and needed a new location. Until Arundel's donation, the property had been slated to become a development of more than 500 homes. The site has instead become a model for adaptive use of open space for community events.

The grounds contain four ponds, a small open air stadium used for Twilight Polo, The Shelia C. Johnson Grass Polo Field, and space for public and private events and activities.

Today, Great Meadow has become a valued member of the Virginia charitable and national equestrian sports communities, and is home to the annual Virginia Gold Cup steeplechase races the first Saturday in May, as well as the International Gold Cup Races, held every third Saturday in October, the Saturday night Twilight Polo series during the summer, and the Twilight Jumper series on select Friday evening during the summer. It is also the home to the annual Fourth of July celebration and fireworks, model rocket launches such as the annual American Rocketry Challenge, the pitch of the Warrenton Rugby Football Club's Molly's Marauders, the VHSL Virginia State Cross Country Meet, the Virginia Scottish Games and Festival, the Virginia Wine Festival, and public astronomy events hosted regularly by the Northern Virginia Astronomy Club.
