= Battle of Buckland Mills =

Battle of the American Civil War

Coordinates: 38.7747°N 77.692°W

- Part of American Civil War
- Buckland from Mr. Huntons house (sketch of A. R. Waud, later published in Harper's Weekly magazine)
Date	October 19, 1863
Location	Fauquier County, Virginia
Result	Confederate victory

Belligerents
United States (Union)	(Confederate States of America) CSA (Confederacy)

Commanders and leaders
Hugh Judson Kilpatrick; George A. Custer; Henry Eugene Davies	J.E.B. Stuart; Fitzhugh Lee

Strength
4,000	8,000

Casualties and losses
261	41

The Battle of Buckland Mills, also known as The Buckland Races or Chestnut Hill, was fought on October 19, 1863, between Union and Confederate forces in the American Civil War. Union cavalry led by Brig. Gen. Judson Kilpatrick were caught in a Confederate ambush and defeated.

Near Buckland Mills, on Broad Run, Confederate cavalry commander Maj. Gen. J.E.B. Stuart, with Maj. Gen. Wade Hampton's cavalry division, were covering Gen. Robert E. Lee's retirement from his defeat at Bristoe to the Rappahannock River. On October 19, they turned on Kilpatrick's pursuing Federal cavalry, while Maj. Gen. Fitzhugh Lee's division charged the Federal flank. Kilpatrick was routed, fleeing five miles to Haymarket and Gainesville. The Confederates derisively called the affair "The Buckland Races", although some Confederate commanders likened it to a fox hunt. The Condeferate forces incurred 41 casualties. The Union forces lost about 261 men, most of which were taken prisoner.

== Battlefield preservation ==
The Civil War Trust (a division of the American Battlefield Trust) and its partners have acquired and preserved 91 acres (0.37 km^{2}) of the battlefield.
