= Bleak, Virginia =

Unincorporated community in Virginia, United States

- Unincorporated community
- Location within Virginia Location within the United States
- Coordinates: 38°31′17″N 77°40′54″W
- Country: United States
- State: Virginia
- County: Fauquier
- Elevation: 436 ft (133 m)
- Time zone: UTC−5 (Eastern (EST))
  - Summer (DST): UTC−4 (EDT)
- GNIS feature ID: 1495275

Bleak is an unincorporated community in Fauquier County, Virginia, United States.

Bleak had postal facilities in the early 1900s.
