= Liberty, Fauquier County, Virginia =

Unincorporated community in Virginia, United States

Liberty
- Unincorporated community
- Location within Northern Virginia Location within Virginia Location within the United States
- Coordinates: 38°36′00″N 77°46′18″W
- Country: United States
- State: Virginia
- County: Fauquier
- Time zone: UTC−5 (Eastern (EST))
  - Summer (DST): UTC−4 (EDT)
- GNIS feature ID: 1749282

Liberty is an unincorporated community in Fauquier County, Virginia, United States, near Remington. It lies at an elevation of 358 feet (109 m).
