= The Plains, Virginia =

- Town
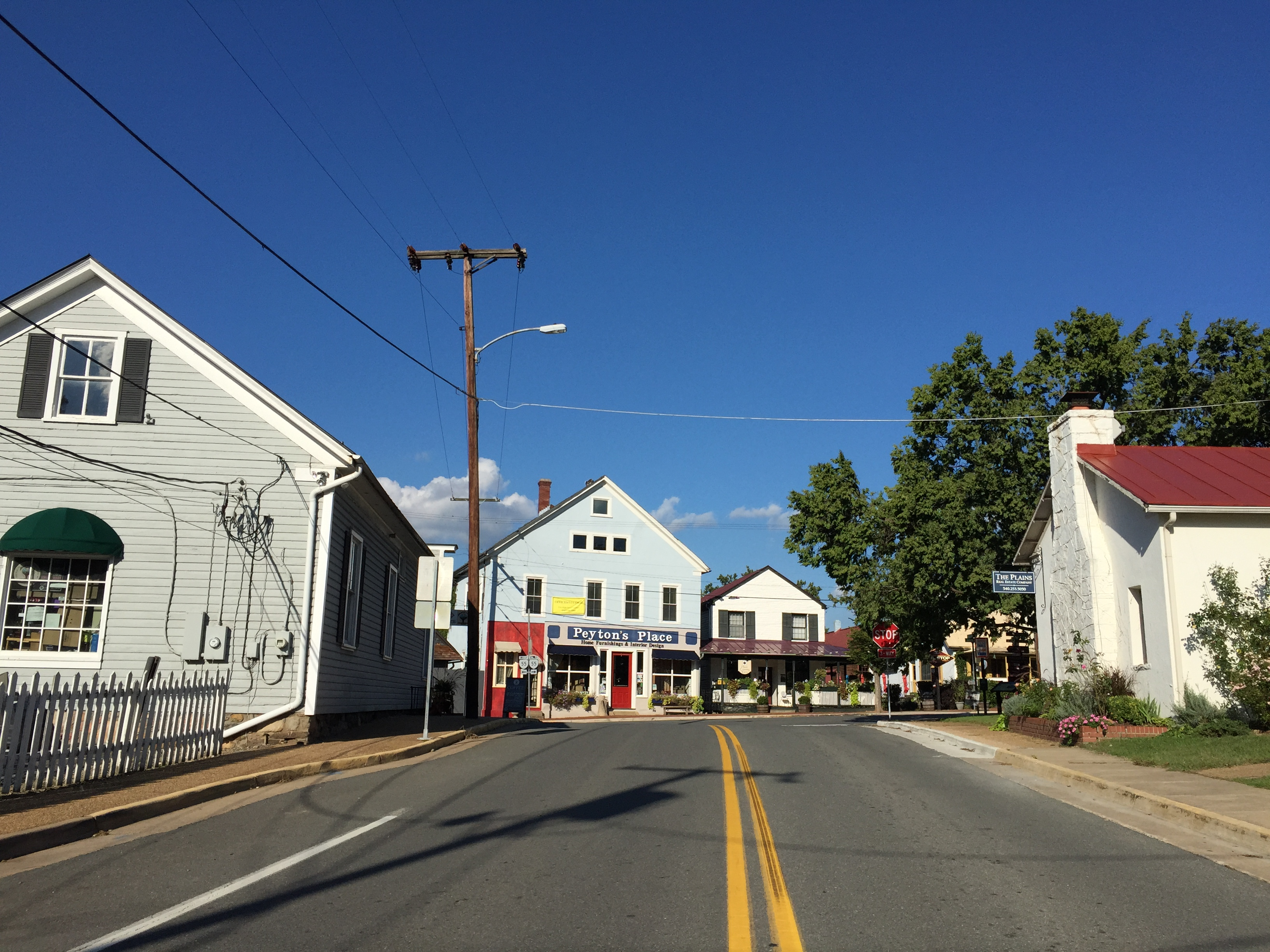
- The center of town

- Seal

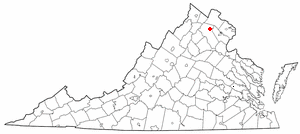
- Location of The Plains in Virginia
- Coordinates: 38°51′46″N 77°46′32″W
- Country: United States
- State: Virginia
- County: Fauquier
- Founded: 1910

Government
  - Mayor: Lori Sisson

Area
  - Total: 0.27 sq mi (0.71 km^{2})
  - Land: 0.27 sq mi (0.71 km^{2})
  - Water: 0 sq mi (0.00 km^{2})
- Elevation: 610 ft (190 m)

Population (2020)
  - Total: 245
  - Estimate (2022): 239
  - Density: 890/sq mi (350/km^{2})
- Time zone: UTC-5 (Eastern (EST))
  - Summer (DST): UTC-4 (EDT)
- ZIP Code: 20198
- Area code: 540
- FIPS code: 51-78192
- GNIS feature ID: 1496309
- Website: www.townoftheplainsvirginia.gov
- The Plains Historic District
- U.S. National Register of Historic Places
- U.S. Historic district
- Location within Virginia
- Location: Parts of Main, Mosby, Lee, Bragg, Stuart, Jackson, Pickett & Broad Sts., Fauquie, The Plains, Virginia
- Area: 130.9 acres (53.0 ha)
- NRHP reference No.: 14000232
- Added to NRHP: May 21, 2014

The Plains is a small incorporated town in Fauquier County, Virginia, United States. The population was 245 as of the 2020 census, up from 217 at the 2010 census. It is centered on the intersection of VA 55 (John Marshall Highway) and VA 245 (Old Tavern Road). The town of The Plains is situated off I-66. As of November 2024, the mayor of The Plains is Lori Sisson.

== History ==
In the 18th century, the Colony of Virginia progressively expanded westward and allowed Europeans to begin to construct settlements in the area. Before and during the Civil War, the area was called "White Plains" on maps and a Post Office was named "The Plains" in 1831. A two-story house, with a blacksmith's shop above, was built in 1852. During the Civil War, John S. Mosby and his Mosby's Raiders used The Plains as part of the raiding area they controlled. The Plains was incorporated as a town in 1910.

== Geography ==
The Plains is located in northeastern Fauquier County at 38°51′46″N 77°46′32″W (38.862698, -77.775464). VA 55 leads southeast 10 miles (16 km) to Gainesville and west 4.5 miles (7.2 km) to Marshall. VA 245 leads southwest 1 mile (1.6 km) to I-66 at Exit 31. I-66 leads east 45 miles (72 km) to Washington, D.C., and west 24 miles (39 km) to Front Royal.

According to the United States Census Bureau, the town has a total area of 0.3 square miles (0.7 km^{2}), all land.

=== Climate ===
The climate in this area is characterized by hot, humid summers and generally mild to cool winters. According to the Köppen Climate Classification system, The Plains has a humid subtropical climate, abbreviated "Cfa" on climate maps.

== Demographics ==
Historical population
Census	Pop.	Note	%±
1920	275		—
1930	414		50.5%
1940	372		−10.1%
1950	405		8.9%
1960	484		19.5%
1970	418		−13.6%
1980	382		−8.6%
1990	219		−42.7%
2000	266		21.5%
2010	217		−18.4%
2020	245		12.9%
2022 (est.)	239	▼	−2.4%
U.S. Decennial Census

As of the census of 2000, there were 266 people, 110 households, and 70 families residing in the town. The population density was 1,035.1 people per square mile (395.0/km^{2}). There were 118 housing units at an average density of 459.2 per square mile (175.2/km^{2}). The racial makeup of the town was 89.85% White and 10.15% African American. Hispanic or Latino of any race were 0.38% of the population.

There were 110 households, out of which 25.5% had children under the age of 18 living with them, 44.5% were married couples living together, 14.5% had a female householder with no husband present, and 35.5% were non-families. 31.8% of all households were made up of individuals, and 10.9% had someone living alone who was 65 years of age or older. The average household size was 2.42 and the average family size was 3.01.

In the town, the population was spread out, with 21.1% under the age of 18, 5.6% from 18 to 24, 32.0% from 25 to 44, 26.3% from 45 to 64, and 15.0% who were 65 years of age or older. The median age was 42 years. For every 100 females, there were 91.4 males. For every 100 females aged 18 and over, there were 85.8 males.

The median income for a household in the town was $43,750, and the median income for a family was $45,313. Males had a median income of $41,250 versus $33,542 for females. The per capita income for the town was $27,909. About 13.7% of families and 14.1% of the population were below the poverty line, including 11.1% of those under the age of eighteen and 14.8% of those 65 or over.

== Attractions ==
The Plains is home to Great Meadow, a large open-air and open-field facility that hosts several large events throughout the year, such as the Virginia Gold Cup steeplechase horse race, which attracts over 50,000 guests on the first Saturday of each May, as well as being the home of the Team America Rocketry Challenge held in the same month.

Archwood Green Barns Farmer's Market features fresh, homemade and local products. Hours are Sunday, 10:00 a.m. to 3:00 p.m. beginning the last Sunday in April through the 2nd Sunday in November. It is open the first two Sundays in December for the "Christmas on the Farm" show.

A museum exhibit, "Footprint to Change", is located at 4243 Loudoun Avenue near the train tracks that go through town. The building houses the Afro-American Historical Association of Fauquier County offices, library and archives as well as the museum.

Long Branch Baptist Church (est. 1786), the third oldest Baptist church in Virginia, lies 4 miles (6 km) north of The Plains in the unincorporated area called Halfway. The evangelist William Broaddus, founder of Southwestern Seminary in Louisville, Kentucky, was pastor there in the 1830s. His nephew John Broadus is often called "the father of homiletics" (preaching).

Wakefield School, a pre-school through Grade 12 independent school, is located just south of the town limits.

Actor Robert Duvall once owned a restaurant in The Plains called "The Rail Stop", named after the Norfolk Southern B-Line, which runs through the town. He made his residence north of town at his 360-acre (1.5 km^{2}) Byrnley Farm. The town is also home to a seasonal corn maze owned and operated by a family in Charlottesville.

The National Association of Rocketry held their annual meet, NARAM-50, there in the summer of 2008 after NARAM-46 was held at The Plains in 2004.

The Masonic lodge was organized on a site near the present post office. The Plains Lodge U.D. held its first meeting on December 29, 1898, and continued to work "Under Dispensation" until the Grand Lodge of Virginia met in Alexandria on December 15, 1899, and issued the lodge a charter under the name of Cochran Lodge No. 271.

Beverley Mill was listed on the National Register of Historic Places in 1972, and most of the town was listed as The Plains Historic District in 2014.

== Transportation ==
Highways directly serving The Plains include Virginia State Route 55 and Virginia State Route 245. SR 55 extends east and west, serving as a local service road to nearby I-66, while SR 245 provides the most direct connection to I-66 from The Plains.

== Gallery ==
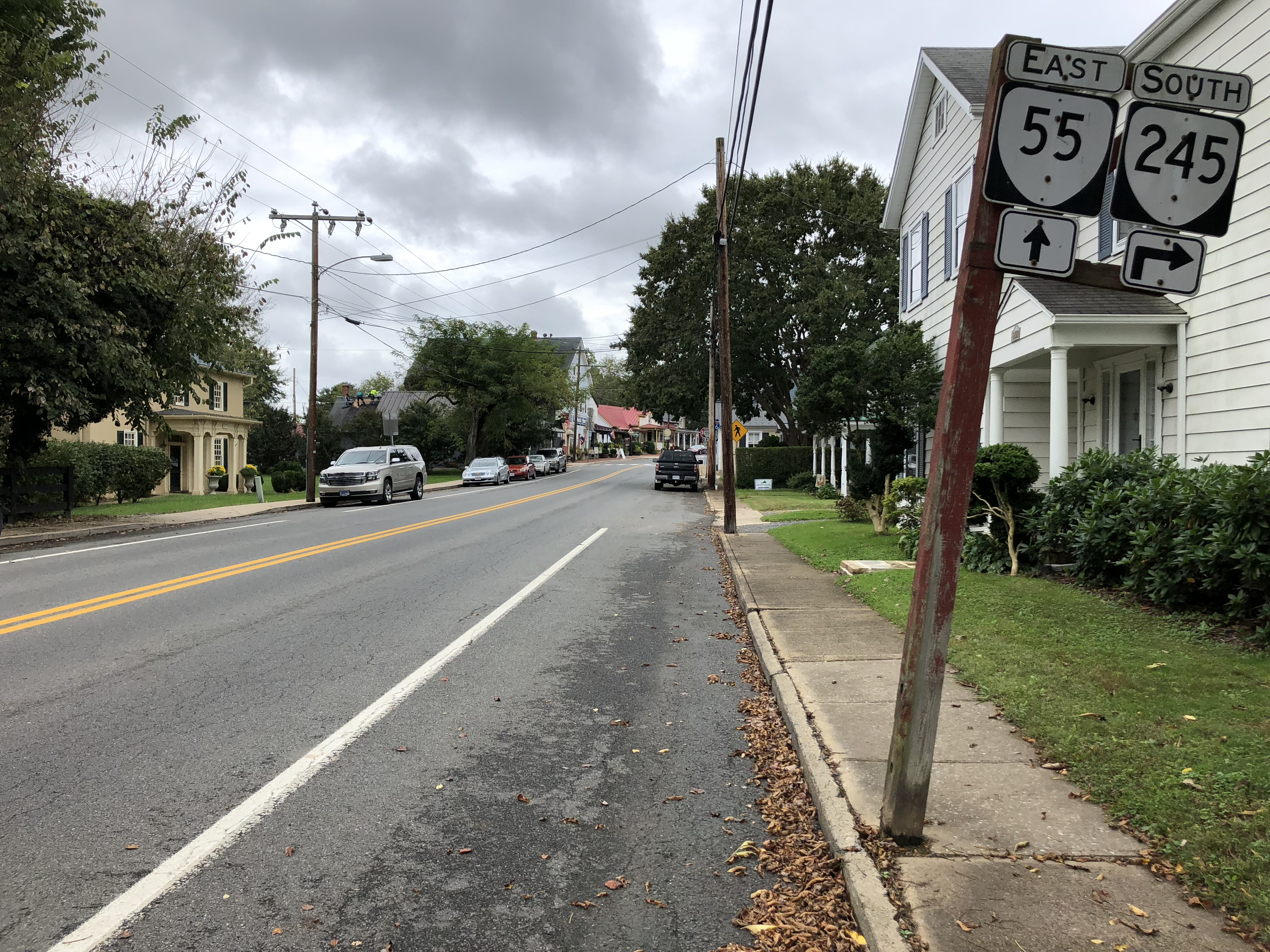
View east along SR 55 approaching SR 245

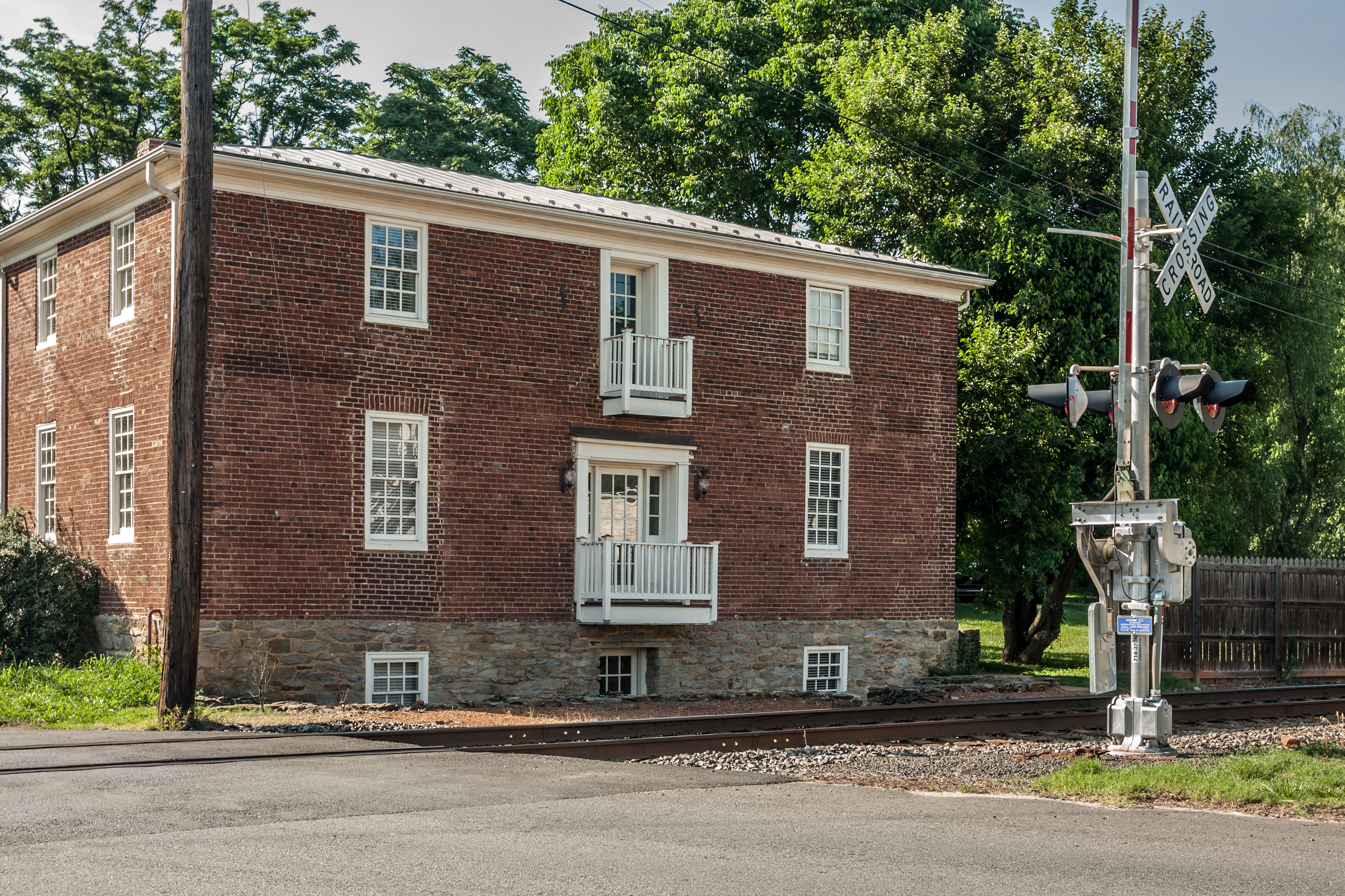
Carter Hotel next to Norfolk Southern RR tracks

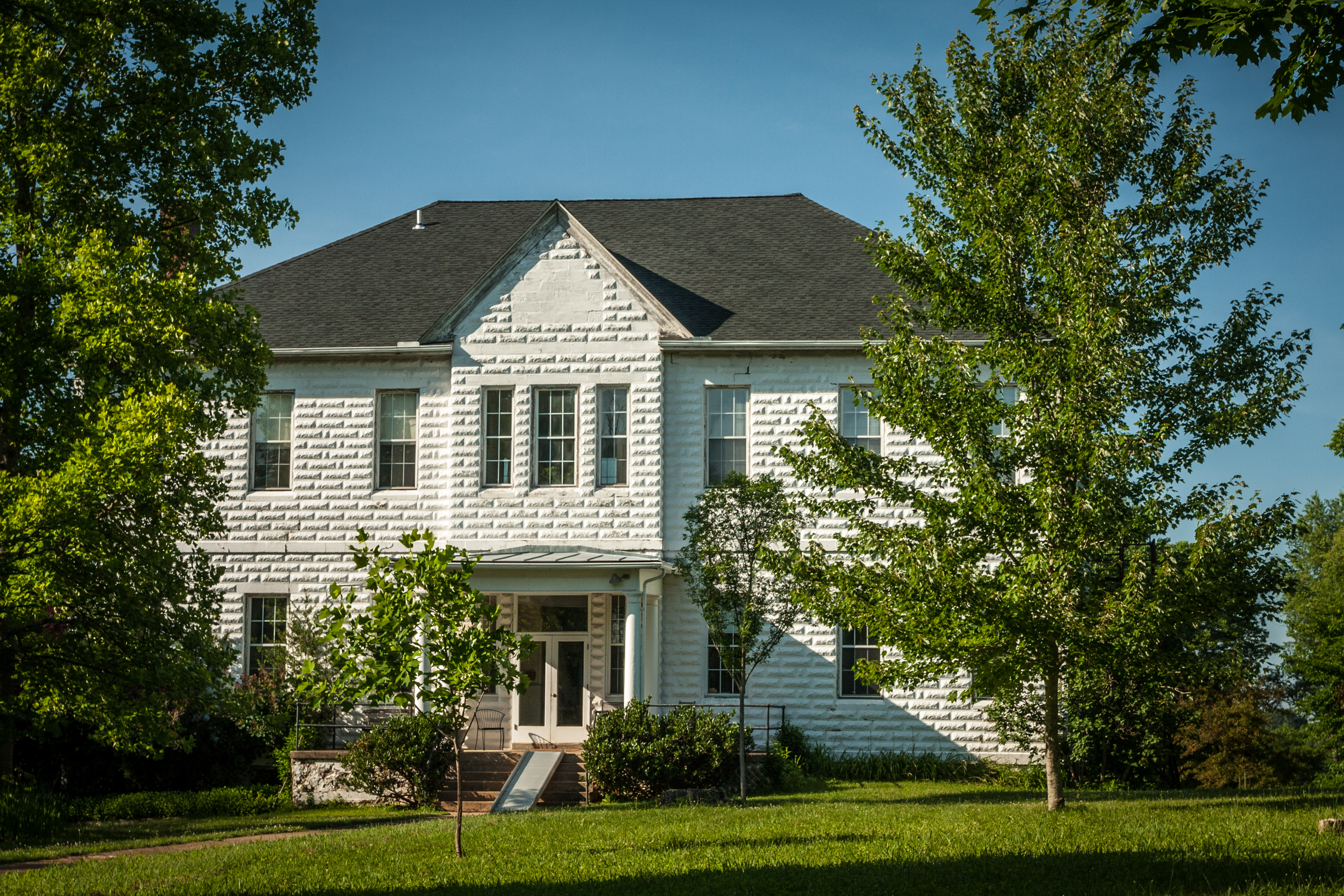
Old High School at west end of town

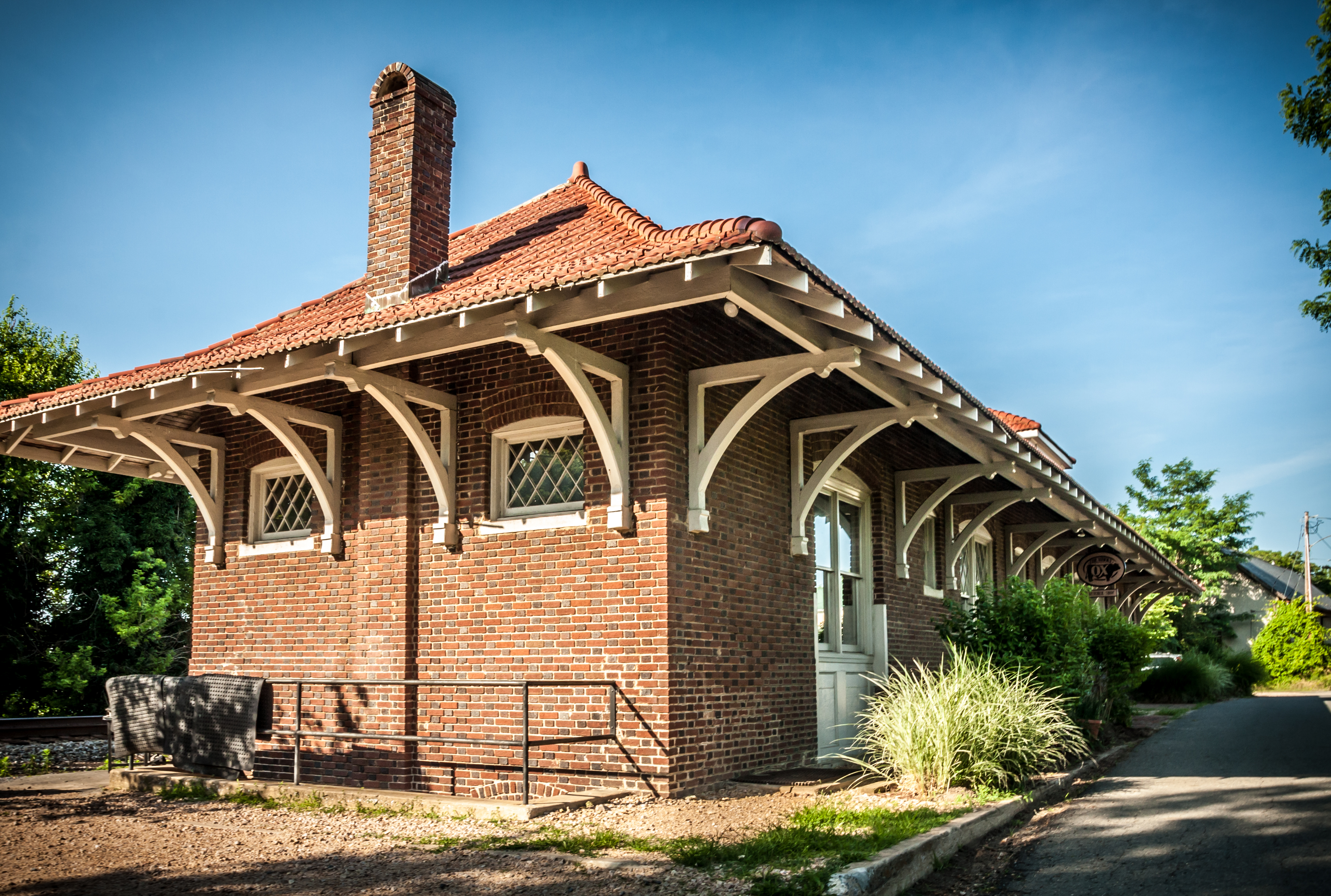
Train depot - brick

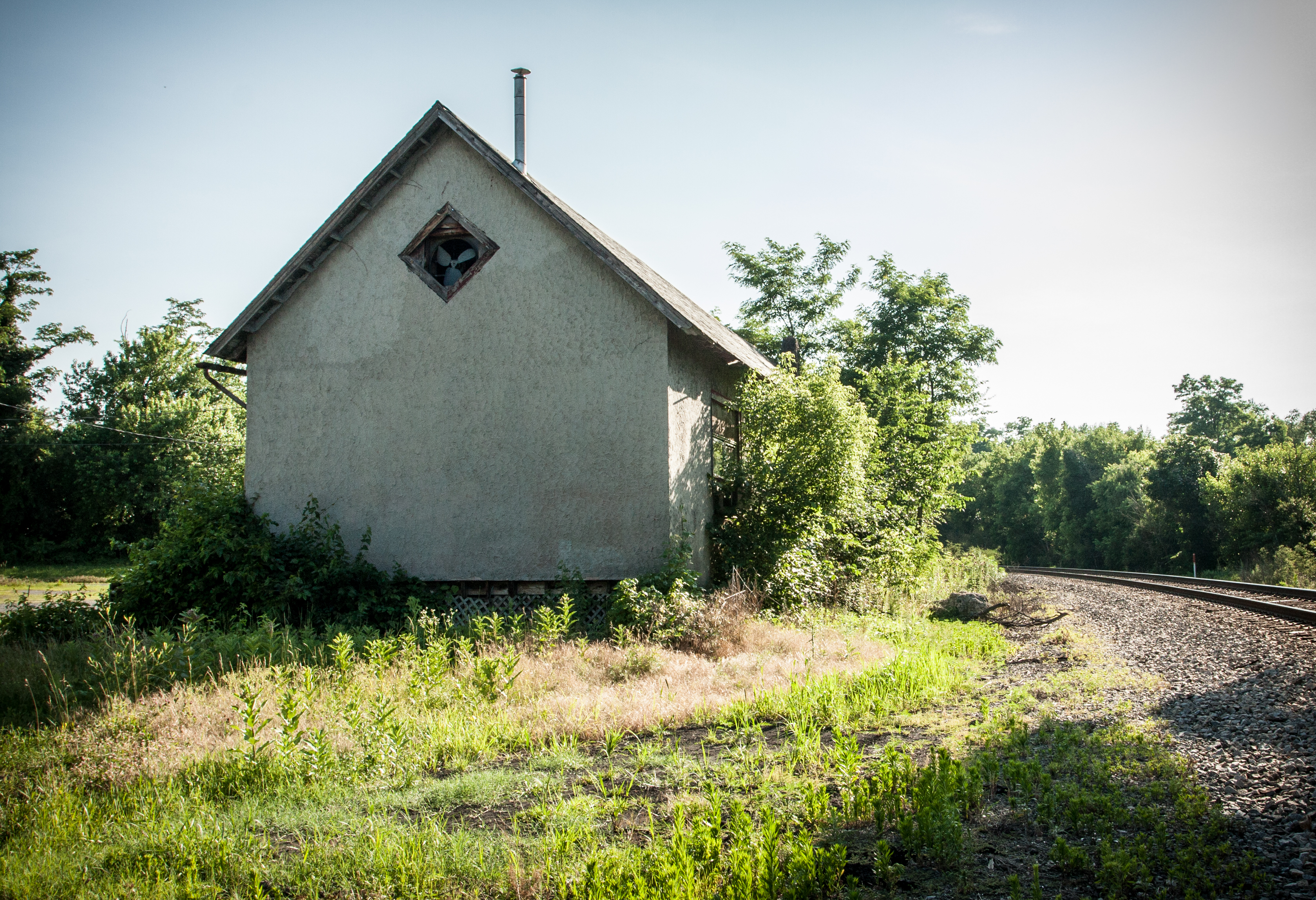
Train depot - frame

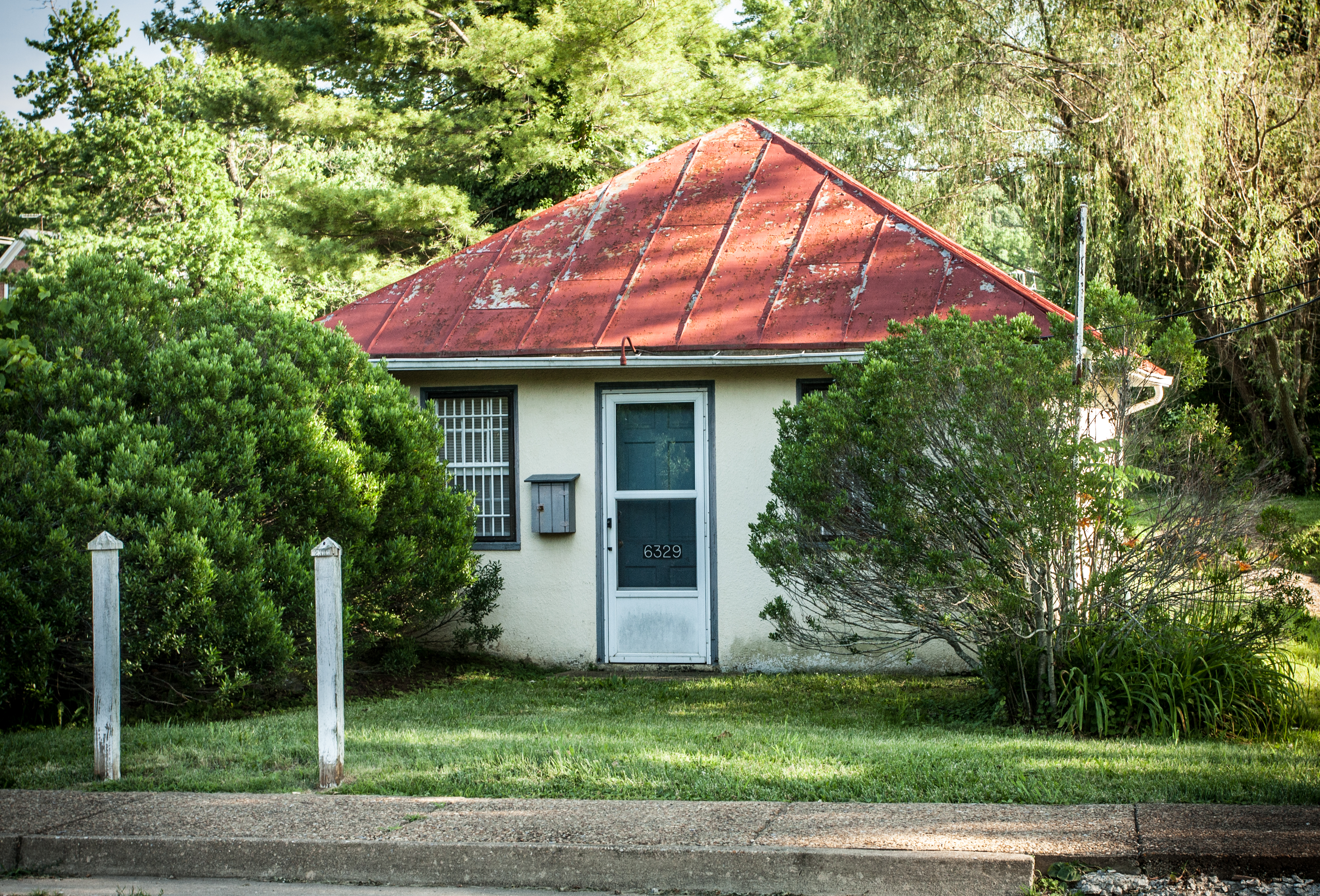
Former jail

== See also ==
- National Register of Historic Places listings in Fauquier County, Virginia
- Virginia Plain
