= Fauquier =

Fauquier may refer to:

== People ==
- Francis Fauquier (1703–1768), lieutenant governor of Virginia Colony
- Frederick Fauquier (1817–1881), Canadian Anglican priest
- Frederick G. Fauquier, Canadian politician
- George Fauquier (1798–1887), English cricketer
- Harry Fauquier (born 1942), Canadian tennis player
- John Emilius Fauquier (1909–1981), Canadian aviator and Second World War Bomber Command leader

== Places ==
=== Canada ===
- Fauquier, British Columbia, Canada
- Fauquier-Strickland, Ontario, Canada

=== United States ===
- Fauquier County, Virginia, United States
  - Fauquier County Public Schools
    - Fauquier High School
  - Fauquier County Sheriff's Office
  - Old Fauquier County Jail
  - Warrenton-Fauquier Airport
