= Ziegfeld (disambiguation) =

Florenz Ziegfeld Jr. (1867–1932) was an American theatre impresario, famous for the Ziegfeld Follies revues.

Ziegfeld may also refer to:

- Ziegfeld: The Man and His Women, a 1978 television film
- Ziegfeld Theatre (disambiguation)
- Ziegfeld girl, a woman appearing in the eponymous follies

== See also ==
- Ziegfeld's, a bar in Washington, D.C.
