= Ella Fitzgerald (drag queen) =

American drag queen

Donnell Robinson
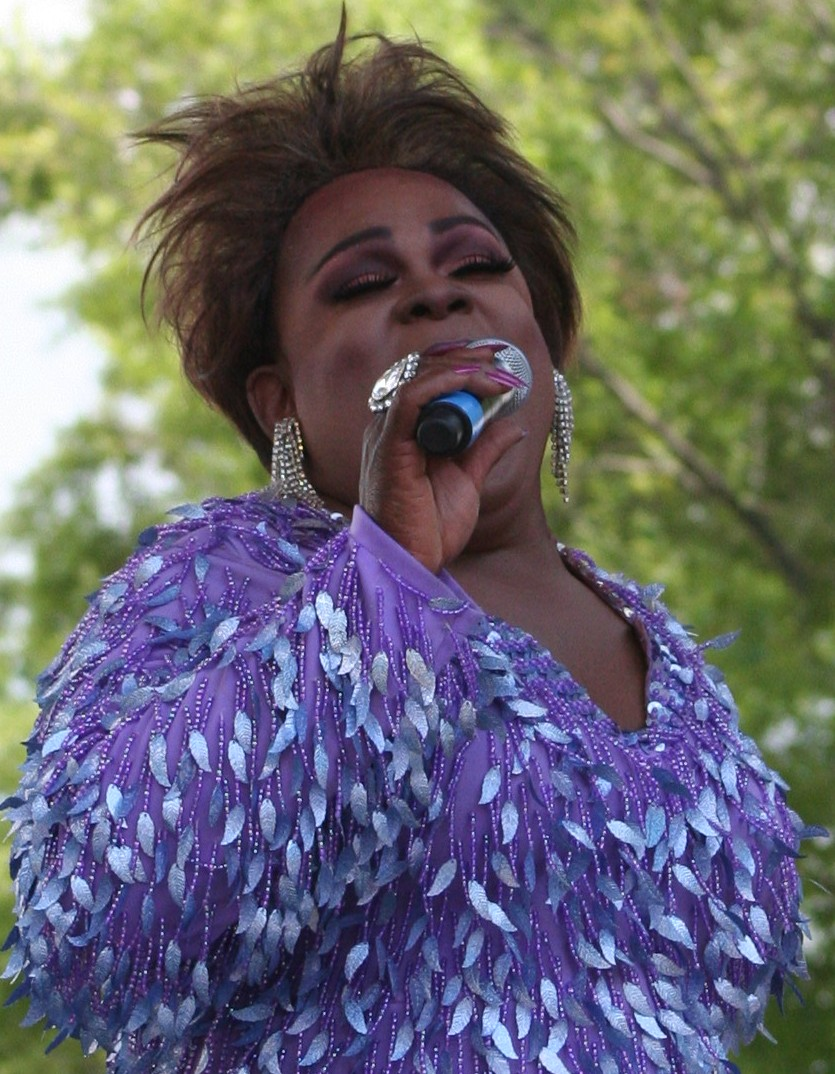
- Ella Fitzgerald performs at Capital Pride in 2008.
- Born: Donnell Robinson c. 1955 (age 70–71); Warrenton, Virginia
- Occupation: Drag queen
- Years active: 1975-present

Ella Fitzgerald is the drag persona of Donnell Robinson (born c. 1955), an American drag queen based in Washington, D.C. Known as "the doyenne of D.C.'s drag scene," she hosted a long-running show at the drag club Ziegfeld's and is a mainstay of the city's annual Capital Pride.

== Early life ==
Donnell Robinson was born in the mid-1950s. He grew up on a farm in the area of Warrenton, Virginia, where he was raised by his grandparents while his mother worked as a domestic worker in Fairfax, Virginia. His first foray into drag, before he was even aware of drag's existence, was portraying the Flip Wilson character Geraldine Jones at an eighth-grade talent show.

After struggling at Fauquier High School while balancing schoolwork with farmwork and caring for his grandparents, he managed to graduate in 1974, though he was not able to attend college due to his family's financial situation. A friend took him to the Pier 9 nightclub, where he watched a drag performance for the first time. He would go on to win his first drag competition there.

== Career ==
Robinson moved to Arlington and began performing drag in D.C. in 1975. After initially taking the stage under the name Sharyn O'Brien, someone suggested that "you need an African American name. At your size, you should be Ella Fitzgerald," so Robinson began performing under that name.

Ella Fitzgerald came to play a central role in the city's drag scene, described by the LGBTQ magazine Metro Weekly as "a local drag legend" and "the doyenne of D.C.’s drag scene," and by the Washington Post as "the doyenne of Washington drag queens."

She was a key member of the Academy of Washington, a now-shuttered social club for drag performers, and won various awards from the organization before it closed in 2015. At the Academy, she led the "Drag Daughters" house.

Before moving to Ziegfeld's in 1980, she had performed at clubs such as the Rogue, the Plus One, and the Other Side. There, she hosted the long-running Ladies of Illusion show on weekends until the nightclub's closure during the 2020 COVID-19 pandemic. Fitzgerald, who created the show, served as director, emcee, and performer, and became one of the club's best-known acts, sometimes referred to as the "First Lady of Ziegfeld's." She has also performed periodically at other clubs, such as Freddie's Beach Bar in Virginia, and is a mainstay of Capital Pride, D.C.'s annual LGBTQ pride parade. By 2026, she had largely retired from performing, making only occasional appearances.

Beginning in the 1980s, Fitzgerald hosted fundraisers in response to the HIV/AIDs crisis, a cause she continues to support.

Ella Fitzgerald at Capital Pride
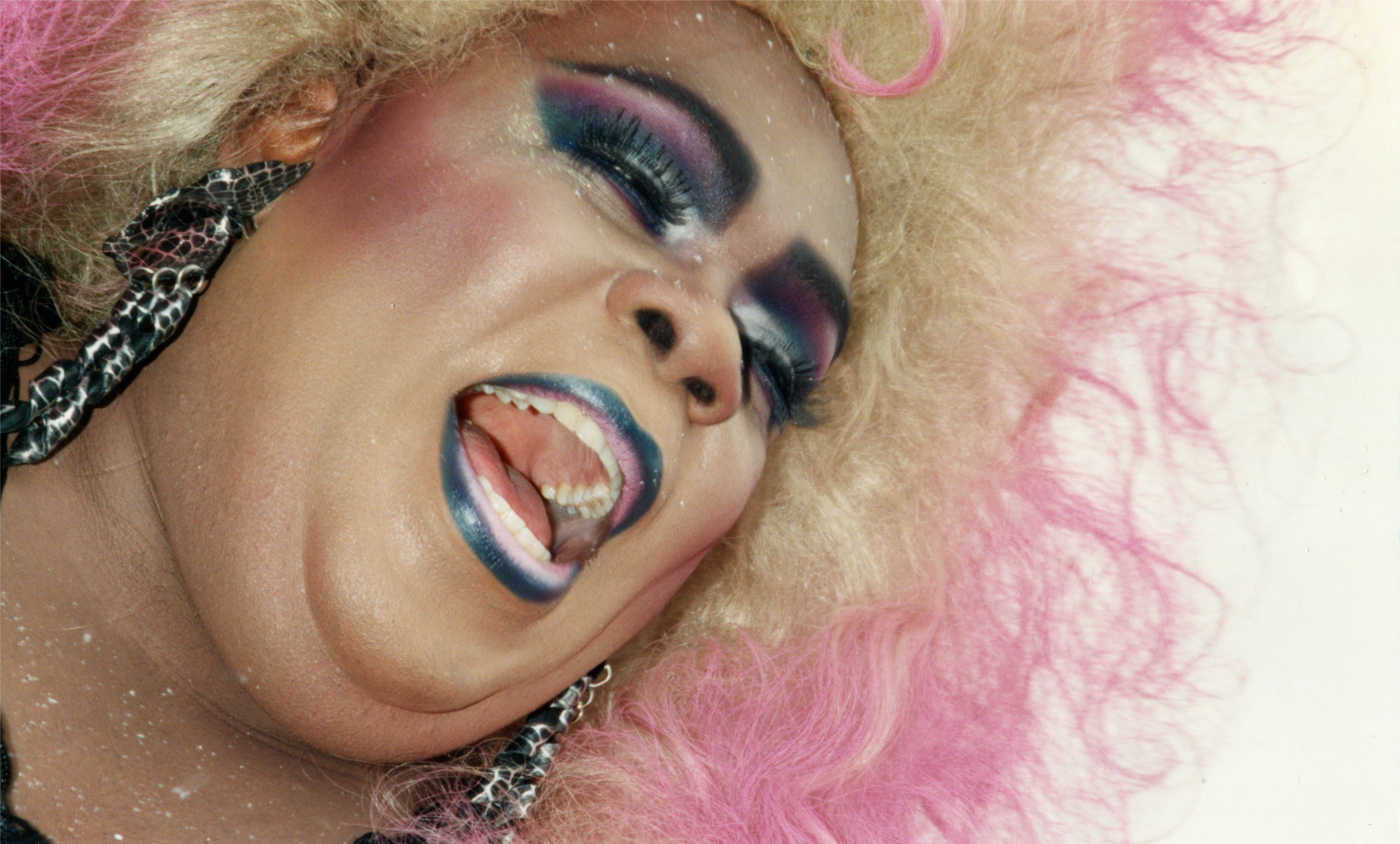
Ella Fitzgerald performs at Capital Pride in 1994.

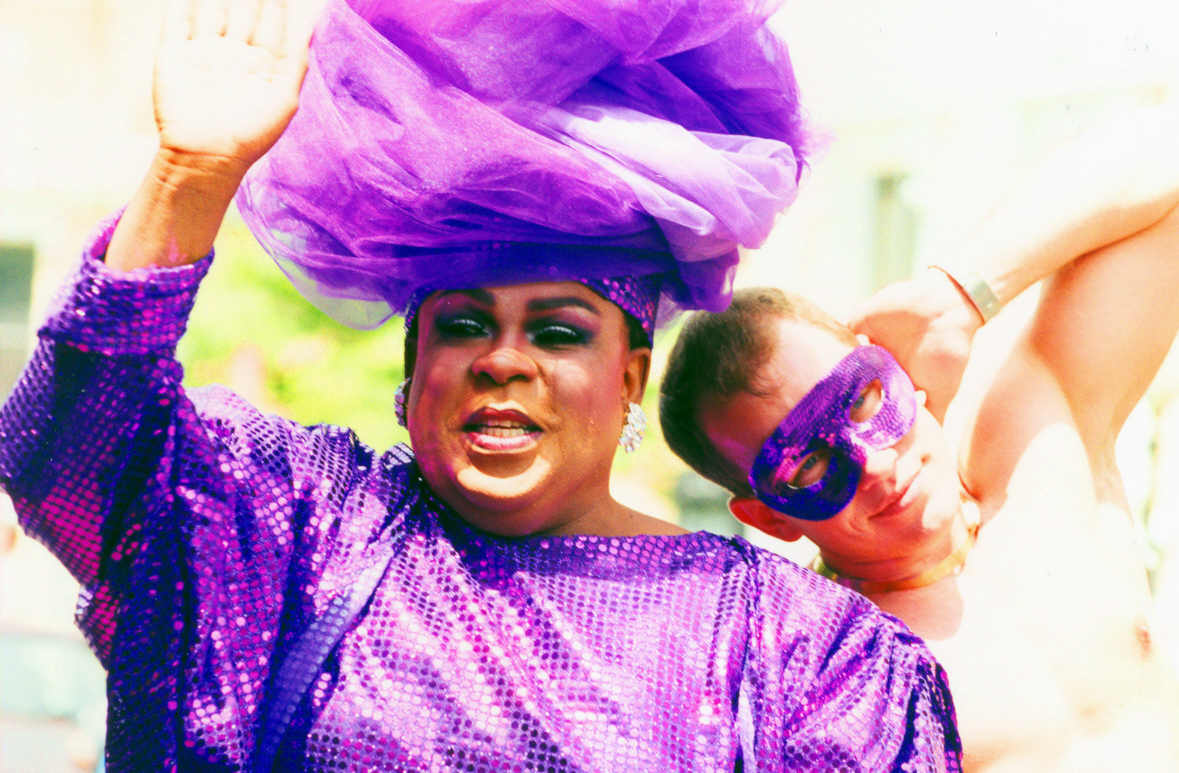
Fitzgerald at Capital Pride in 1998.

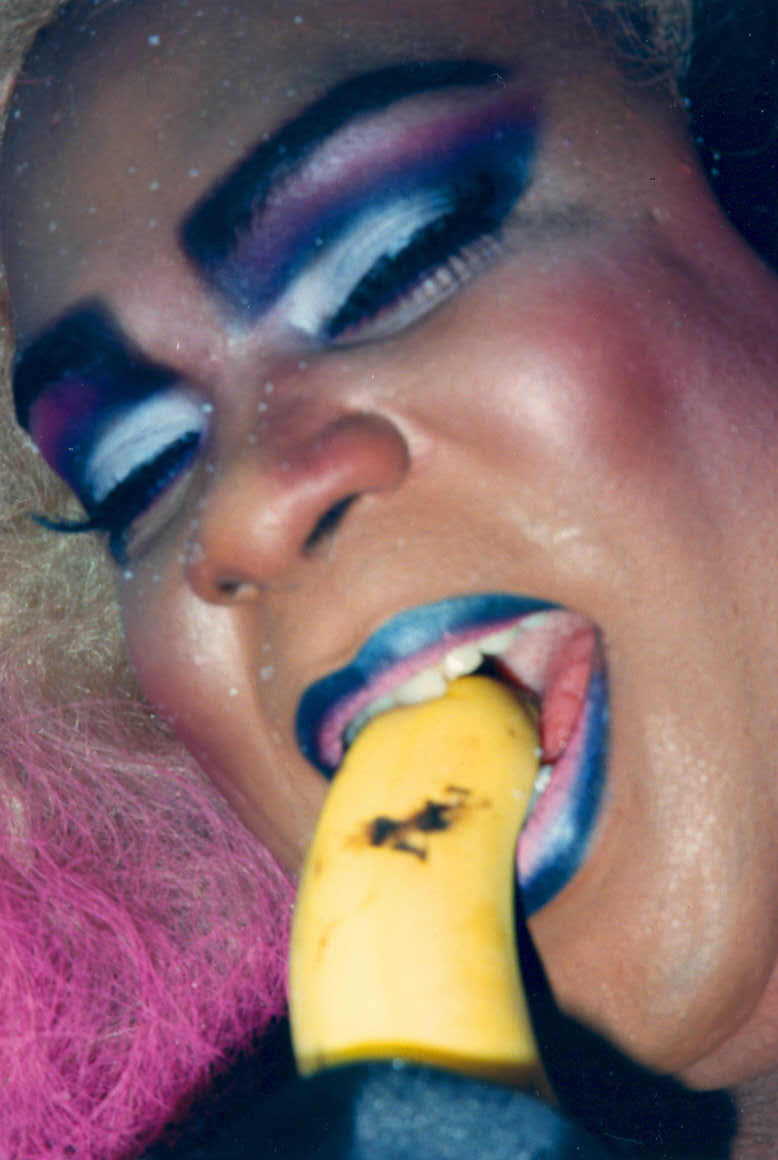
Fitzgerald with a banana, a signature element of her Capital Pride performances, in 1994.

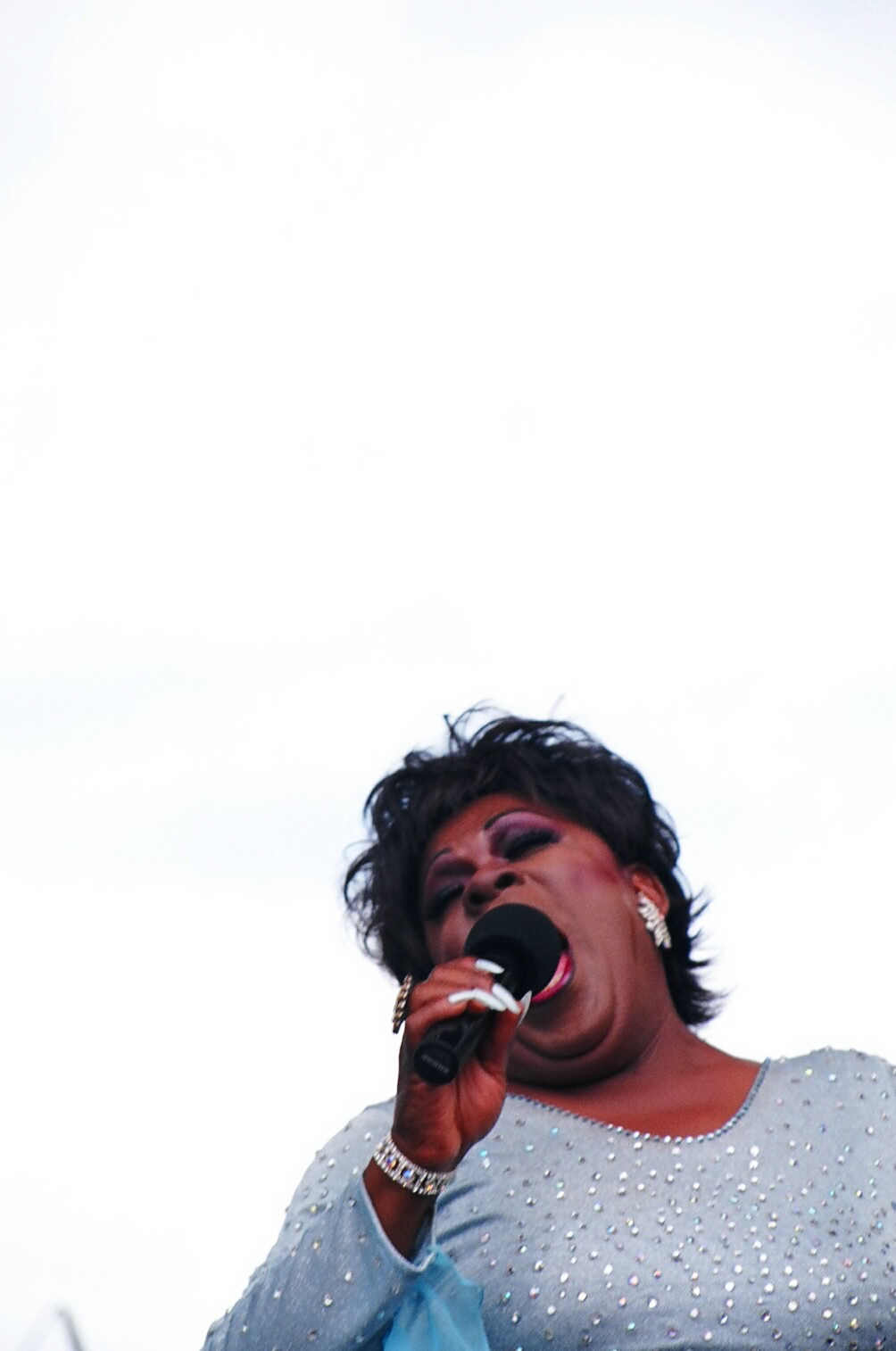
Fitzgerald performs at Capital Pride in 2005.
