= Kettle Run High School =

Kettle Run High School can refer to:

- Kettle Run High School (Nokesville, Virginia), in Fauquier County
- Patriot High School (Prince William County, Virginia) (originally named Kettle Run)
