= Liberty High School (Bealeton, Virginia) =

Coordinates: 38°35′22.3″N 77°45′55.8″W

Location
- 6300 Independence Avenue; Bealeton, Virginia 22712

Information
- School type: Public high school
- Motto: "Leadership, High expectations, Service"
- Founded: 1994
- School board: Charles Keith
- School district: AA Evergreen District
- Superintendent: Dr. David Jeck
- Principal: Sam Cox
- Grades: 9–12
- Enrollment: 1,246 (2016-17)
- Language: English
- Campus: Rural
- Colors: Red, White, and Navy Blue
- Mascot: Eagle
- Rival Schools: Fauquier High School; Kettle Run High School
- Athletic Conference: Evergreen District; Region II
- Website: https://lhs.fcps1.org/

Liberty High School is a public secondary school in Bealeton, Virginia. The school is part of Fauquier County Public School System and is located at 6300 Independence Avenue.

== History ==
Liberty opened in 1994 to alleviate crowding at Fauquier High School, the sole high school in Fauquier County at the time. The school was also built to accommodate the sprawling southern part of the county, close to the Fredericksburg area; this is one of the fastest-growing areas in Virginia.

Liberty High School opened under the leadership of Mr. John C. Harrison, Liberty's first principal and longtime educator in the Fauquier County School System. Liberty's original administrative team included John C. Harrison, Roger Lee, Linda Neiderer and John Fitzgerald. Mr. Fitzgerald was the first to leave his post (date unknown), followed by Roger Lee, who took a position as assistant principal at neighboring Fauquier High School. Mr. Harrison retired at the completion of the 1999–2000 school year.

Mr. Harrison's successor, Dr. Trudy K. Peterman, took the helm as Liberty's second principal but her tenure proved short-lived after a battle with the school system's superintendent, and school board over the handling of the schools' HVAC system and resulting mold issues. Dr. Peterman was placed on administrative leave in late January, 2001 and did not return to the helm of the school.

A familiar face, former principal John C. Harrison, returned to head Liberty temporarily to provide a calming effect for the community, the faculty and staff and, most importantly, the students for the completion of the 2000–2001 school year. Mr. Harrison remained principal for the following school year as time was taken to find a proper replacement.

At the beginning of the 2002–2003 school year, former assistant principal Roger Lee, a member of the school's original administrative team, returned to become Liberty's third principal. Mr. Lee continues to serve as Liberty's principal for the 2008–2009 school year, working with Linda Neiderer, the assistant principal who has been at Liberty from the start.

In 2008, Kettle Run High School opened in Fauquier County under the leadership of Major Warner II, who had been a former guidance director at Liberty during the 2000 school year. This reduced Liberty's enrollment from 1771 to around 1400.

== Demographics ==
In 2017–18, Liberty's student body was 67.8% White; 10.8% Black; 16.8% Hispanic; 1% Asian; and 3% consisted of Two or More Races.

== Accreditation ==
Liberty High School is a fully accredited high school based on its performance on the Standards of Learning tests in Virginia.

== Academic Opportunities ==
Select students at the high school are eligible to apply to Mountain Vista Governor's School to take advanced math, science, humanities, and research courses.

== Athletics ==
The mascot is a bald eagle and the sports teams currently play in the AA Evergreen District The Eagles have won four AA state titles, two for cheerleading in 1999 and 2001; and one in 1998 for Girls Outdoor Track, and most recently in 2011 for Girls Basketball. Notable alum include Jazmon Gwathmey, WNBA player. Another notable alum, is NFL 2nd team All-Pro offensive guard, Wyatt Teller, who now plays for the Cleveland Browns. Kalani Heppe and Ryan Washington are alumni who went to play college football as well.

== Notable alumni ==
- Dillon Stith (2010), basketball player who plays professionally in Australia
- Jazmon Gwathmey (2011), WNBA player, represented Puerto Rico internationally
- Wyatt Teller (2013), NFL All-Pro (guard)
