= Mountain Vista =

Mountain Vista may refer to:

- Mountain Vista High School (Highlands Ranch, Colorado)
- Mountain Vista Governor's School (Virginia State Governor's School)
