= Eddie Generazio =

American actor and musician

Eddie Danger
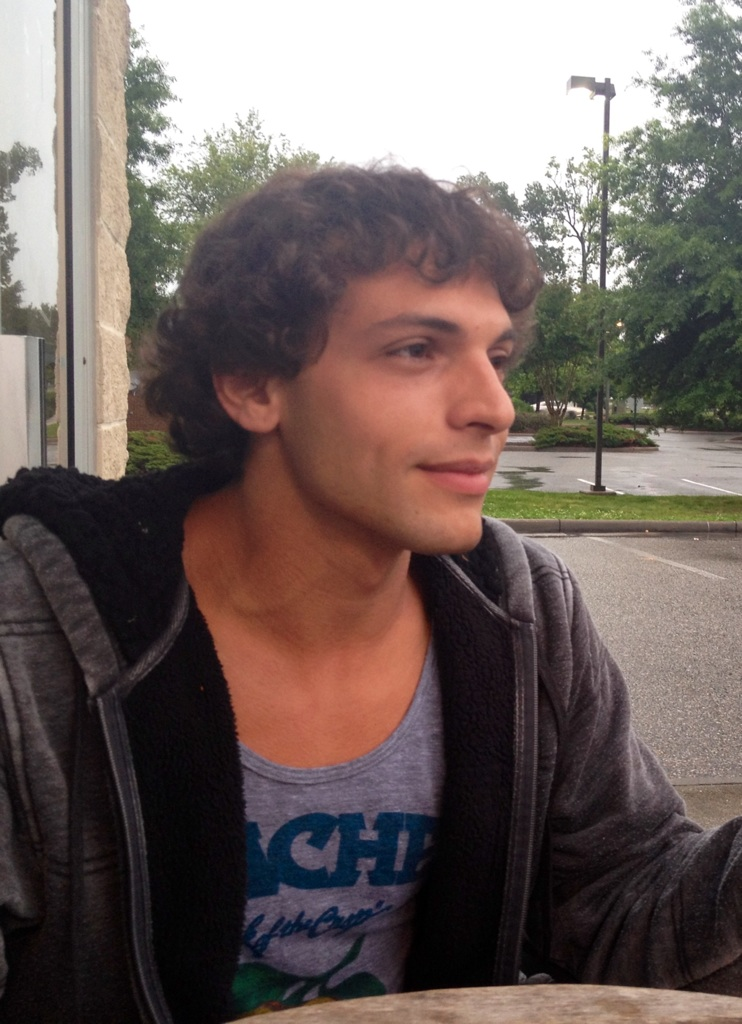
- Generazio in 2012
- Born: August 2, 1990 (age 36); Cleveland, Ohio, U.S.
- Other names: Eddie Generazio, Christian Lezzil
- Occupation: Student
- Known for: Crimson & Caramel (book of poetry), exotic dancing, modeling

Edward Danger Generazio II (born August 2, 1990), also known as Eddie Generazio or Eddie Danger, is an American model, author, musician, dancer and software developer. He is best known for two works of poetry, Crimson & Caramel and The Maniac in the Coffee Shop. He is also the drummer and a vocalist in the band Black Clover. In 2012, he adopted the stage name Christian Lezzíl and began exotic dancing. Members of the public voted him the "hottest stripper or gogo dancer" in the District of Columbia in October 2013.

== Early life ==
Generazio was born in Cleveland, Ohio, in August 1990. His maternal grandparents, were immigrants from Italy (his grandmother was born in Torre dei Passeri). Generazio's father was a doctorate in physics and a research scientist. His mother had a master of Science. Yorktown, Virginia. He attended Tabb High School in Yorktown, where he was editor of his high school newspaper (the Tiger Times) and contributed to a relationship advice column under the pseudonym "Pumpkin Joe". He later wrote a series of editorials titled "In The Fast Lane". Generazio also became increasingly interested in music during high school as well. He played the drums, and in 2011 became a member of a new competitive indoor drumline, the Tabb X-Treme Team. The drumline team won second place in the novice category at its first competition, and second place at the Atlantic Indoor Association. Generazio also organized fundraising concerts in high school to benefit local social service agencies such as Transitions Family Violence Shelter in Hampton, Virginia.

He attended Virginia Wesleyan College, where he was accepted into the Honors and Scholars Program (an individualized honors program). After grudgingly taking a required Spanish language course, he found he greatly enjoyed the language and became intensely interested in Spanish culture. He later spent a semester in Mexico, and ended up majoring in English—Creative Writing and Spanish. English literature and creative writing classes at Virginia Wesleyan also sparked his interest in poetry. While an undergraduate, he was editor of the college literary magazine The Outlet. He also spent time writing poetry, playing the guitar and drums, traveling, and bodybuilding.

== Written works ==
While studying abroad in Mexico, Generazio conceived his first poetry collection. His first book of poetry, Crimson & Caramel, was published by Floating Head Press in August 2011. Generazio, who drew artwork for and designed the book, said the poems "deal with self-identification in an otherwise anonymous society".

In October 2011, Generazio said his next book would also be a work of poetry, titled Rocky.

Instead, Generazio released a travel narrative, The Maniac in the Coffee Shop, on May 17, 2012. The e-book, published in the Amazon Kindle format, covers his travels around the world as a high school and college student.

A third book, planned for publication in late 2013 or early 2014, under the working title I'm a Weird Guy, Now: Christian Lezzil's Guide to Stripping will cover Generazio's experiences as an exotic dancer. Generazio says that there is "a lot of poetry" in exotic dancing and the alternative lifestyle scene, and he found his experiences generated so much material that the "book kind of wrote itself."

Rocky was re-titled Slowly, in your Sweetest Hour and released in November 2014.

== Black Clover ==
When he was in middle school, Generazio participated in a Metallica tribute band. This band dissolved in 2004, and Generazio, a former bandmate, and new band member Sam Haywood created an experimental rock band they named Black Clover. Generazio played drums and sang for the band. Black Clover played a series of dates in the Hampton Roads, Virginia, area and went through several membership changes. Their multimedia shows included projected images and sound effects produced on pieces of metal or with children's toys. Their stage performances also consisted of puppet shows, robots, and balloon art.

A live album, An Observation by Black Clover, was followed by a studio album, The Happy Friends EP. Additional membership changes occurred, during which Corey Bartos joined the band. A series of songs, collectively known as "The Muppet Sessions", were written, and the band toured regionally. Black Clover went on hiatus, reuniting occasionally to write new songs and working sporadically with other artists. The band released a third album, Bucket O' Money! The Essential Black Clover, on May 5, 2012, on Flying Robert Records.

In December 2013, Black Clover reunited to release a new album entitled We Used to Have a Band.

The various members of Black Clover were interviewed by "fourculture," a website and magazine dedicated to music, literature, and the arts. Aaron Wallace (fourculture) writes: "The band certainly doesn’t shy away from their sordid histories. In fact, they celebrate them and include them in the tracks as inspiration for their music."

In 2016, Black Clover reunited with bassist, Nik Warman, and recorded an album entitled Pornocopia, released on September 27, 2016.

While working with Black Clover, Generazio also contributed to a street punk band, The Vons, and a glam metal band, Bigfoot.

== Exotic dancing ==
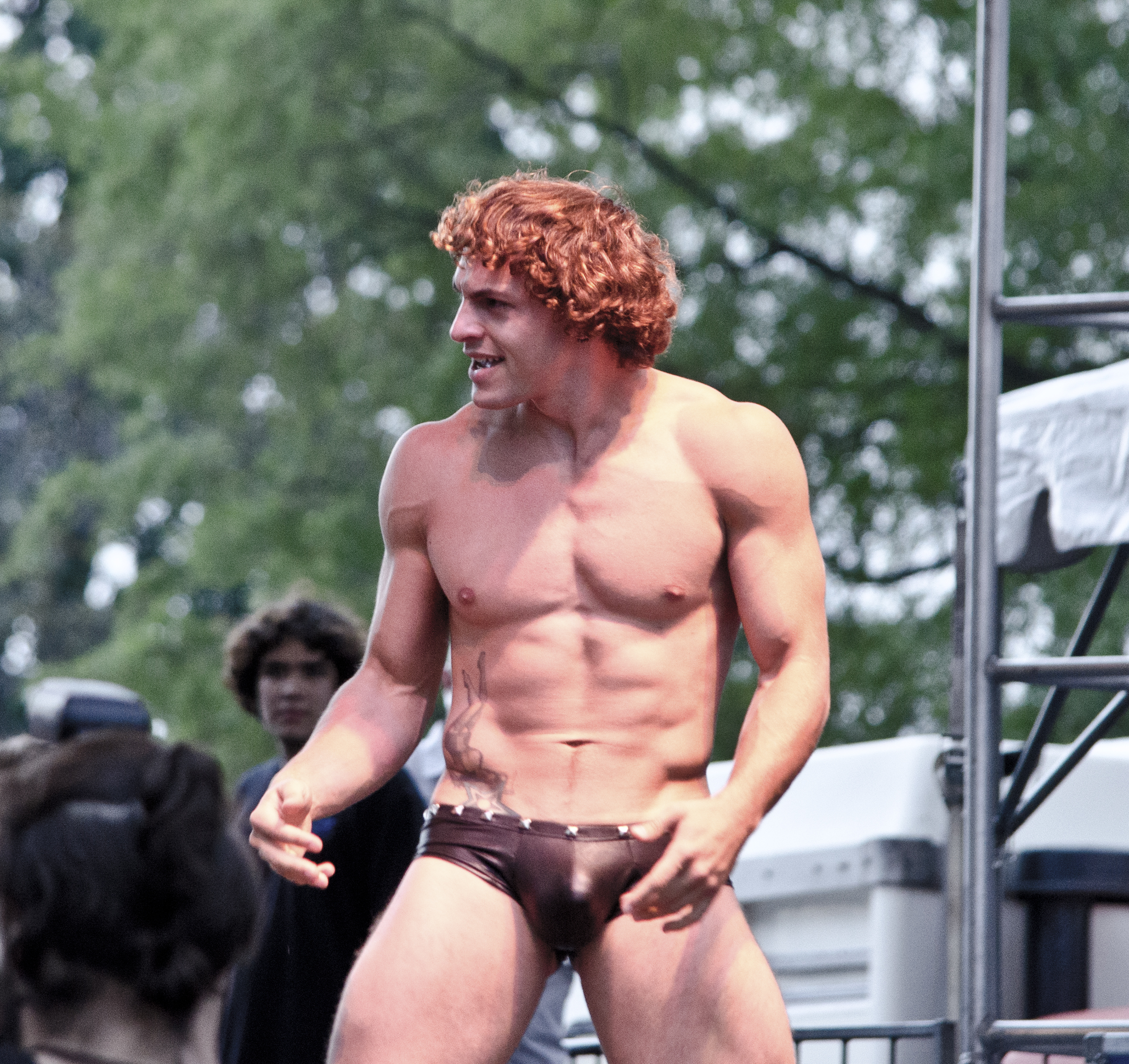
Generazio as "Christian Lezzil" at Gay Pride in Washington D.C. in 2013

After graduating from Virginia Wesleyan in 2011, Generazio spent six months researching The Maniac in the Coffee Shop, and taking modeling and acting classes. He signed with a modeling agency, and began working as a photographer's model. He then enrolled in a master's degree program at George Mason University. His anticipated graduation is the spring of 2014.

In the fall of 2012, Generazio began exotic dancing under the stage name Christian Lezzil while waiting for his application to graduate school to be accepted. His first performance was at a "hot student body" competition in Virginia Beach, Virginia. He was looking for experience in an alternative lifestyle, and an all-male revue met that requirement. A friend who performed as a drag queen suggested that he then seek work in Washington, D.C., as a full-time exotic dancer. Shortly after he adopted a drag daughter “Rumor Millz Lezzil” who later became just “Rumor Millz” and seemingly no longer has any affiliation with the dancer. Generazio said he started dancing as a lark, but the work generated enough income to pay for his graduate education. He works primarily at Ziegfeld's in Washington, D.C., although he has made special appearances in cities such as New York City and Charlotte, North Carolina. Generazio says he greatly enjoys exotic dancing. "Maybe I'm just a jerk and I'm inflating it, but I think of it as a kind of performance art." He also finds the juxtaposition of being an academic and stripper enjoyably ironic (although he emphasizes that many fellow dancers are similarly situated).

In July 2013, Generazio appeared under his "Christian Lezzil" pseudonym in Beautiful Mag, photographed by Woody Norvell.

In October 2013, members of the public in the D.C. metropolitan area voted him D.C.'s "Hottest Stripper or GoGo Dancer" in the Washington Blade's "Best of Gay D.C." The following year, he was voted runner up against Adult Entertainment mogul, Steven Pena.

In December 2013, readers of Metro Weekly voted him "Coverboy of the Year."

In May 2014, Generazio appeared under his "Christian Lezzil" pseudonym for a two article photography series in an Australian publication DNA Magazine, photographed by Eric Russell.

In September 2016, Generazio joined the cast of SIR, a Magic Mike-inspired brunch and burlesque show at Washington DC's Sax Restaurant & Lounge.
