= 2025 EchoPark Automotive Grand Prix =

NASCAR Cup Series race

Race details
- Race 3 of 36 in the 2025 NASCAR Cup Series
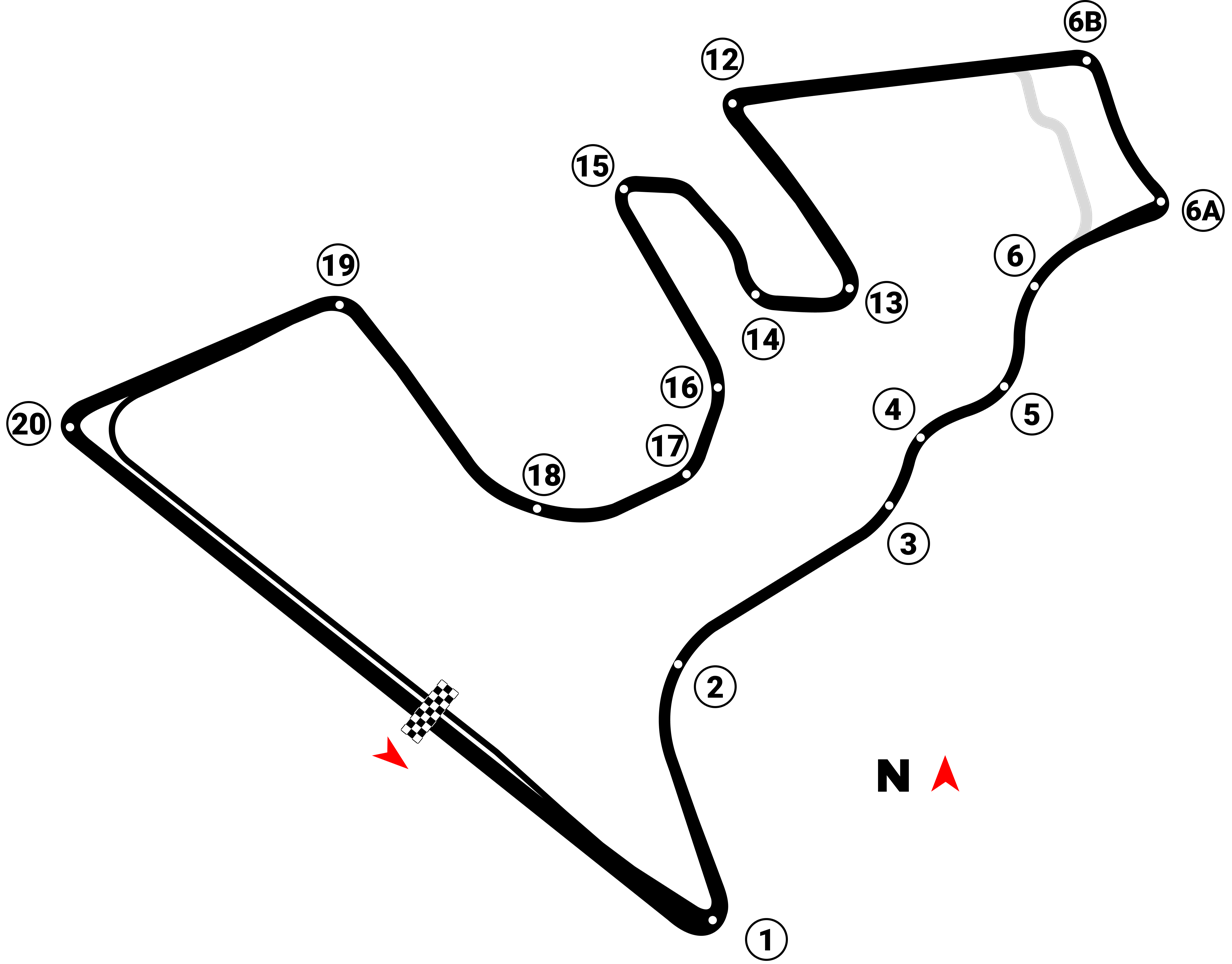
- Date: March 2, 2025
- Location: Circuit of the Americas in Austin, Texas
- Course: Permanent racing facility
- Course length: 2.400 miles (3.862 km)
- Distance: 95 laps, 228 mi (367 km)
- Average speed: 73.025 miles per hour (117.522 km/h)

Pole position
Driver	Tyler Reddick	23XI Racing
- Time: 1:38.076

Most laps led
Driver	Kyle Busch	Richard Childress Racing
- Laps: 42

Fastest lap
Driver	Kyle Larson	Hendrick Motorsports
- Time: 1:39.244

Winner
No. 20	Christopher Bell	Joe Gibbs Racing

Television in the United States
- Network: Fox
- Announcers: Mike Joy, Clint Bowyer, and Kevin Harvick
- Nielsen ratings: 2.15 (4.132 million viewers)

Radio in the United States
- Radio: PRN
- Booth announcers: Brad Gillie and Mark Garrow
- Turn announcers: Rob Albright (Turn 1), Doug Turnbull (Turns 2–6A), Pat Patterson (Turns 6B–15), and Alex Hayden (Turns 16–20)

The 2025 EchoPark Automotive Grand Prix was a NASCAR Cup Series race held on March 2, 2025, at Circuit of the Americas in Austin, Texas. Contested over 95 laps on the 2.400 mi (3.862 km) road course, it was the third race of the 2025 NASCAR Cup Series season.

Christopher Bell won the race. William Byron finished 2nd, and Tyler Reddick finished 3rd. Chase Elliott and Kyle Busch rounded out the top five, and Shane van Gisbergen, Chris Buescher, Noah Gragson, Alex Bowman, and Todd Gilliland rounded out the top ten.

== Report ==
=== Background ===
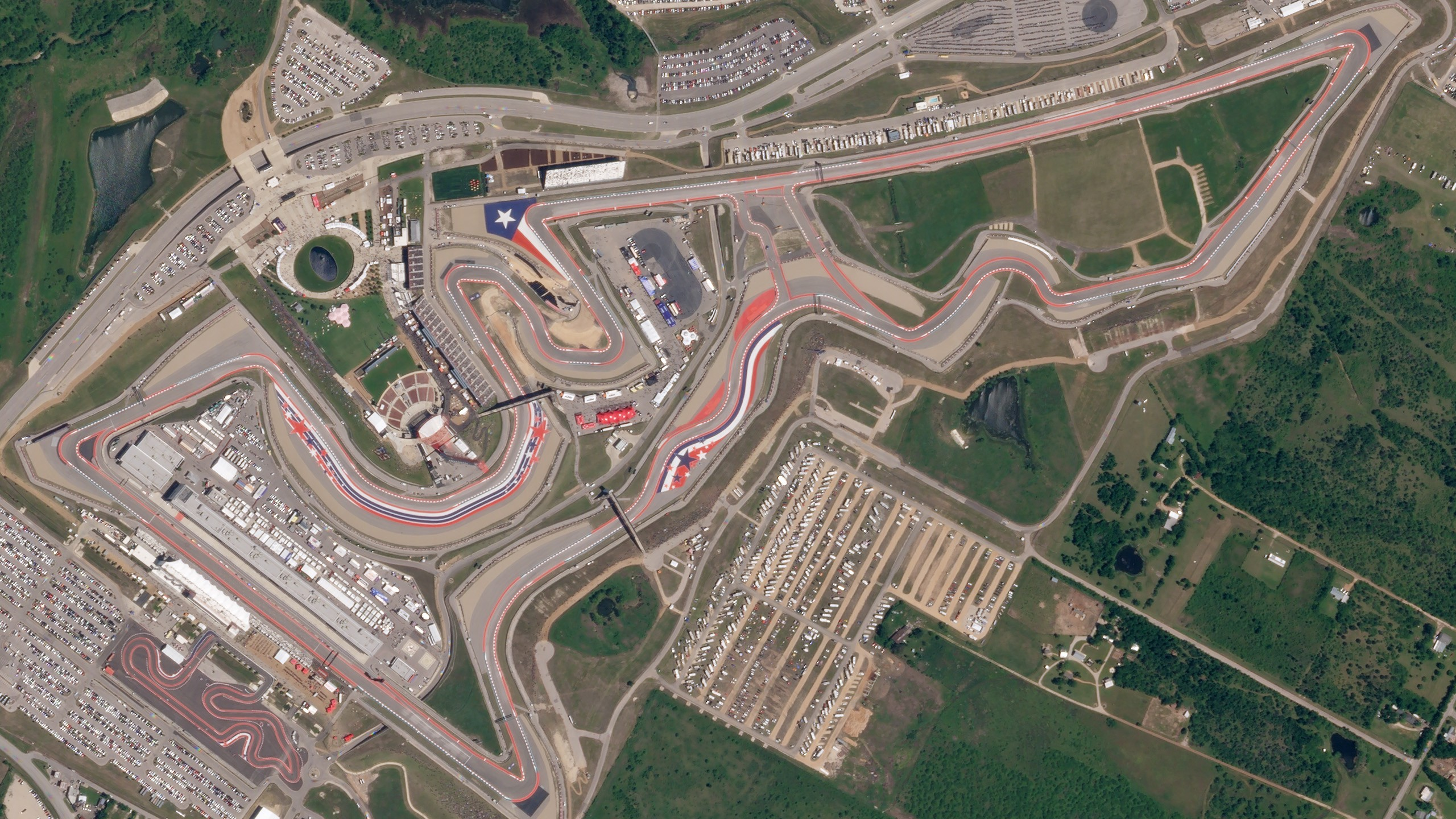
Aerial view of Circuit of the Americas, the track where the race was held.

Circuit of the Americas (COTA) is a grade 1 FIA-specification motorsports facility located within the extraterritorial jurisdiction of Austin, Texas. It features a 3.426-mile (5.514 km) road racing circuit. The facility is home to the Formula One United States Grand Prix, and the Motorcycle Grand Prix of the Americas, a round of the FIM Road Racing World Championship. It previously hosted the Supercars Championship, the FIA World Endurance Championship, the IMSA SportsCar Championship, and IndyCar Series.

On November 20, 2024, it was announced that the race would move to the 2.400 mi (3.862 km) layout.

==== Entry list ====
- (R) denotes rookie driver.
- (i) denotes driver who is ineligible for series driver points.

No.	Driver	Team	Manufacturer
1	Ross Chastain	Trackhouse Racing	Chevrolet
2	Austin Cindric	Team Penske	Ford
3	Austin Dillon	Richard Childress Racing	Chevrolet
4	Noah Gragson	Front Row Motorsports	Ford
5	Kyle Larson	Hendrick Motorsports	Chevrolet
6	Brad Keselowski	RFK Racing	Ford
7	Justin Haley	Spire Motorsports	Chevrolet
8	Kyle Busch	Richard Childress Racing	Chevrolet
9	Chase Elliott	Hendrick Motorsports	Chevrolet
10	Ty Dillon	Kaulig Racing	Chevrolet
11	Denny Hamlin	Joe Gibbs Racing	Toyota
12	Ryan Blaney	Team Penske	Ford
16	A. J. Allmendinger	Kaulig Racing	Chevrolet
17	Chris Buescher	RFK Racing	Ford
19	Chase Briscoe	Joe Gibbs Racing	Toyota
20	Christopher Bell	Joe Gibbs Racing	Toyota
21	Josh Berry	Wood Brothers Racing	Ford
22	Joey Logano	Team Penske	Ford
23	Bubba Wallace	23XI Racing	Toyota
24	William Byron	Hendrick Motorsports	Chevrolet
34	Todd Gilliland	Front Row Motorsports	Ford
35	Riley Herbst (R)	23XI Racing	Toyota
38	Zane Smith	Front Row Motorsports	Ford
41	Cole Custer	Haas Factory Team	Ford
42	John Hunter Nemechek	Legacy Motor Club	Toyota
43	Erik Jones	Legacy Motor Club	Toyota
45	Tyler Reddick	23XI Racing	Toyota
47	Ricky Stenhouse Jr.	Hyak Motorsports	Chevrolet
48	Alex Bowman	Hendrick Motorsports	Chevrolet
51	Cody Ware	Rick Ware Racing	Ford
54	Ty Gibbs	Joe Gibbs Racing	Toyota
60	Ryan Preece	RFK Racing	Ford
71	Michael McDowell	Spire Motorsports	Chevrolet
77	Carson Hocevar	Spire Motorsports	Chevrolet
87	Connor Zilisch (i)	Trackhouse Racing	Chevrolet
88	Shane van Gisbergen (R)	Trackhouse Racing	Chevrolet
99	Daniel Suárez	Trackhouse Racing	Chevrolet
Official entry list

== Practice ==
=== First practice ===
Shane van Gisbergen was the fastest in the first practice session with a time of 1:38.855 seconds and a speed of 87.401 mph (140.658 km/h).

Pos	No.	Driver	Team	Manufacturer	Time	Speed
1	88	Shane van Gisbergen (R)	Trackhouse Racing	Chevrolet	1:38.855	87.401
2	48	Alex Bowman	Hendrick Motorsports	Chevrolet	1:39.144	87.146
3	87	Connor Zilisch (i)	Trackhouse Racing	Chevrolet	1:39.282	87.025
Official first practice results

=== Final practice ===
Shane van Gisbergen was the fastest in the final practice session with a time of 1:38.846 seconds and a speed of 87.409 mph (140.671 km/h).

Pos	No.	Driver	Team	Manufacturer	Time	Speed
1	88	Shane van Gisbergen (R)	Trackhouse Racing	Chevrolet	1:38.846	87.409
2	24	William Byron	Hendrick Motorsports	Chevrolet	1:39.434	86.892
3	77	Carson Hocevar	Spire Motorsports	Chevrolet	1:39.478	86.853
Official final practice results

== Qualifying ==
Tyler Reddick scored the pole for the race with a time of 1:38.076 and a speed of 88.095 mph (141.775 km/h).

=== Qualifying results ===
Pos	No.	Driver	Team	Manufacturer	Time	Speed
1	45	Tyler Reddick	23XI Racing	Toyota	1:38.076	88.095
2	23	Bubba Wallace	23XI Racing	Toyota	1:38.300	87.894
3	9	Chase Elliott	Hendrick Motorsports	Chevrolet	1:38.358	87.842
4	77	Carson Hocevar	Spire Motorsports	Chevrolet	1:38.453	87.758
5	99	Daniel Suárez	Trackhouse Racing	Chevrolet	1:38.482	87.732
6	88	Shane van Gisbergen (R)	Trackhouse Racing	Chevrolet	1:38.519	87.699
7	5	Kyle Larson	Hendrick Motorsports	Chevrolet	1:38.579	87.645
8	8	Kyle Busch	Richard Childress Racing	Chevrolet	1:38.589	87.637
9	1	Ross Chastain	Trackhouse Racing	Chevrolet	1:38.702	87.536
10	34	Todd Gilliland	Front Row Motorsports	Ford	1:38.718	87.522
11	11	Denny Hamlin	Joe Gibbs Racing	Toyota	1:38.740	87.503
12	16	A. J. Allmendinger	Kaulig Racing	Chevrolet	1:38.785	87.463
13	54	Ty Gibbs	Joe Gibbs Racing	Toyota	1:38.848	87.407
14	87	Connor Zilisch (i)	Trackhouse Racing	Chevrolet	1:38.928	87.336
15	24	William Byron	Hendrick Motorsports	Chevrolet	1:39.098	87.186
16	71	Michael McDowell	Spire Motorsports	Chevrolet	1:39.184	87.111
17	4	Noah Gragson	Front Row Motorsports	Ford	1:39.205	87.092
18	19	Chase Briscoe	Joe Gibbs Racing	Toyota	1:39.210	87.088
19	20	Christopher Bell	Joe Gibbs Racing	Toyota	1:39.215	87.084
20	38	Zane Smith	Front Row Motorsports	Ford	1:39.237	87.064
21	48	Alex Bowman	Hendrick Motorsports	Chevrolet	1:39.239	87.063
22	47	Ricky Stenhouse Jr.	Hyak Motorsports	Chevrolet	1:39.369	86.949
23	22	Joey Logano	Team Penske	Ford	1:39.426	86.899
24	17	Chris Buescher	RFK Racing	Ford	1:39.456	86.873
25	12	Ryan Blaney	Team Penske	Ford	1:39.490	86.843
26	6	Brad Keselowski	RFK Racing	Ford	1:39.541	86.798
27	3	Austin Dillon	Richard Childress Racing	Chevrolet	1:39.550	86.791
28	60	Ryan Preece	RFK Racing	Ford	1:39.774	86.596
29	7	Justin Haley	Spire Motorsports	Chevrolet	1:39.850	86.530
30	41	Cole Custer	Haas Factory Team	Ford	1:39.902	86.485
31	35	Riley Herbst (R)	23XI Racing	Toyota	1:39.932	86.459
32	43	Erik Jones	Legacy Motor Club	Toyota	1:39.991	86.408
33	42	John Hunter Nemechek	Legacy Motor Club	Toyota	1:40.044	86.362
34	10	Ty Dillon	Kaulig Racing	Chevrolet	1:40.062	86.346
35	21	Josh Berry	Wood Brothers Racing	Ford	1:40.291	86.149
36	2	Austin Cindric	Team Penske	Ford	1:40.702	85.798
37	51	Cody Ware	Rick Ware Racing	Ford	1:42.062	84.654
Official starting lineup

== Race ==
=== Race results ===
==== Stage Results ====
Stage One Laps: 20

Pos	No	Driver	Team	Manufacturer	Points
1	23	Bubba Wallace	23XI Racing	Toyota	10
2	22	Joey Logano	Team Penske	Ford	9
3	88	Shane van Gisbergen (R)	Trackhouse Racing	Chevrolet	8
4	8	Kyle Busch	Richard Childress Racing	Chevrolet	7
5	9	Chase Elliott	Hendrick Motorsports	Chevrolet	6
6	45	Tyler Reddick	23XI Racing	Toyota	5
7	5	Kyle Larson	Hendrick Motorsports	Chevrolet	4
8	99	Daniel Suárez	Trackhouse Racing	Chevrolet	3
9	24	William Byron	Hendrick Motorsports	Chevrolet	2
10	16	A. J. Allmendinger	Kaulig Racing	Chevrolet	1
Official stage one results

Stage Two Laps: 45

Pos	No	Driver	Team	Manufacturer	Points
1	60	Ryan Preece	RFK Racing	Ford	10
2	12	Ryan Blaney	Team Penske	Ford	9
3	71	Michael McDowell	Spire Motorsports	Chevrolet	8
4	8	Kyle Busch	Richard Childress Racing	Chevrolet	7
5	88	Shane van Gisbergen (R)	Trackhouse Racing	Chevrolet	6
6	16	A. J. Allmendinger	Kaulig Racing	Chevrolet	5
7	24	William Byron	Hendrick Motorsports	Chevrolet	4
8	23	Bubba Wallace	23XI Racing	Toyota	3
9	20	Christopher Bell	Joe Gibbs Racing	Toyota	2
10	99	Daniel Suárez	Trackhouse Racing	Chevrolet	1
Official stage two results

=== Final Stage Results ===
Stage Three Laps: 95

Pos	Grid	No	Driver	Team	Manufacturer	Laps	Points
1	19	20	Christopher Bell	Joe Gibbs Racing	Toyota	95	42
2	15	24	William Byron	Hendrick Motorsports	Chevrolet	95	41
3	1	45	Tyler Reddick	23XI Racing	Toyota	95	39
4	3	9	Chase Elliott	Hendrick Motorsports	Chevrolet	95	39
5	8	8	Kyle Busch	Richard Childress Racing	Chevrolet	95	46
6	6	88	Shane van Gisbergen (R)	Trackhouse Racing	Chevrolet	95	45
7	24	17	Chris Buescher	RFK Racing	Ford	95	30
8	17	4	Noah Gragson	Front Row Motorsports	Ford	95	29
9	21	48	Alex Bowman	Hendrick Motorsports	Chevrolet	95	28
10	10	34	Todd Gilliland	Front Row Motorsports	Ford	95	27
11	16	71	Michael McDowell	Spire Motorsports	Chevrolet	95	34
12	9	1	Ross Chastain	Trackhouse Racing	Chevrolet	95	25
13	4	77	Carson Hocevar	Spire Motorsports	Chevrolet	95	24
14	18	19	Chase Briscoe	Joe Gibbs Racing	Toyota	95	23
15	26	6	Brad Keselowski	RFK Racing	Ford	95	22
16	29	7	Justin Haley	Spire Motorsports	Chevrolet	95	21
17	31	35	Riley Herbst (R)	23XI Racing	Toyota	95	20
18	22	47	Ricky Stenhouse Jr.	Hyak Motorsports	Chevrolet	95	19
19	25	12	Ryan Blaney	Team Penske	Ford	95	27
20	2	23	Bubba Wallace	23XI Racing	Toyota	95	30
21	11	11	Denny Hamlin	Joe Gibbs Racing	Toyota	95	16
22	33	42	John Hunter Nemechek	Legacy Motor Club	Toyota	95	15
23	30	41	Cole Custer	Haas Factory Team	Ford	95	14
24	23	22	Joey Logano	Team Penske	Ford	95	22
25	36	2	Austin Cindric	Team Penske	Ford	95	-38
26	35	21	Josh Berry	Wood Brothers Racing	Ford	95	11
27	32	43	Erik Jones	Legacy Motor Club	Toyota	95	10
28	34	10	Ty Dillon	Kaulig Racing	Chevrolet	95	9
29	20	38	Zane Smith	Front Row Motorsports	Ford	95	8
30	12	16	A. J. Allmendinger	Kaulig Racing	Chevrolet	95	13
31	37	51	Cody Ware	Rick Ware Racing	Ford	95	6
32	7	5	Kyle Larson	Hendrick Motorsports	Chevrolet	95	10
33	28	60	Ryan Preece	RFK Racing	Ford	95	4
34	13	54	Ty Gibbs	Joe Gibbs Racing	Toyota	95	3
35	27	3	Austin Dillon	Richard Childress Racing	Chevrolet	80	2
36	5	99	Daniel Suárez	Trackhouse Racing	Chevrolet	50	5
37	14	87	Connor Zilisch (i)	Trackhouse Racing	Chevrolet	49	0
Official race results

=== Race statistics ===
- Lead changes: 20 among 9 different drivers
- Cautions/Laps: 4 for 15 laps
- Red flags: 0
- Time of race: 3 hours, 7 minutes and 20 seconds
- Average speed: 73.025 miles per hour (117.522 km/h)

== Media ==
=== Television ===
Fox Sports covered the race on the television side. Mike Joy, Clint Bowyer, and Kevin Harvick called the race from the broadcast booth. Regan Smith, Josh Sims, and Kaitlyn Vincie handled pit road for the television side, and Larry McReynolds provided insight on-site during the race.

Fox
Booth announcers	Pit reporters	In-race analyst
Lap-by-lap: Mike Joy; Color-commentator: Clint Bowyer; Color-commentator: Kevin Harvick	Regan Smith; Josh Sims; Kaitlyn Vincie	Larry McReynolds

=== Radio ===
PRN had the radio call for the race which was also simulcasted on Sirius XM NASCAR Radio.

PRN
Booth announcers	Turn announcers	Pit reporters
Lead announcer: Brad Gillie; Announcer: Mark Garrow	Turn 1: Rob Albright; Turns 2–6A: Doug Turnbull; Turns 6B–15: Pat Patterson; Turns 16–20: Alex Hayden	Wendy Venturini; Brett McMillan; Heather Debeaux

== Standings after the race ==
Drivers' Championship standings

	Pos	Driver	Points
1	1	William Byron	116
1	2	Ryan Blaney	114 (–2)
	3	Tyler Reddick	111 (–5)
8	4	Christopher Bell	95 (–21)
5	5	Chase Elliott	95 (–21)
1	6	Bubba Wallace	94 (–22)
2	7	Alex Bowman	87 (–29)
6	8	Michael McDowell	85 (–31)
14	9	Kyle Busch	81 (–35)
2	10	Ricky Stenhouse Jr.	80 (–36)
6	11	Chris Buescher	77 (–39)
1	12	Joey Logano	77 (–39)
6	13	John Hunter Nemechek	76 (–40)
2	14	Carson Hocevar	72 (–44)
	15	Chase Briscoe	72 (–44)
10	16	Kyle Larson	71 (–45)
Official driver's standings

Manufacturers' Championship standings

	Pos	Manufacturer	Points
1	1	Toyota	115
1	2	Chevrolet	110 (–5)
	3	Ford	93 (–22)

- Note: Only the first 16 positions are included for the driver standings.

Previous race: 2025 Ambetter Health 400	NASCAR Cup Series; 2025 season	Next race: 2025 Shriners Children's 500
