= Kaitlyn Vincie =

American sports presenter and journalist (born 1987)

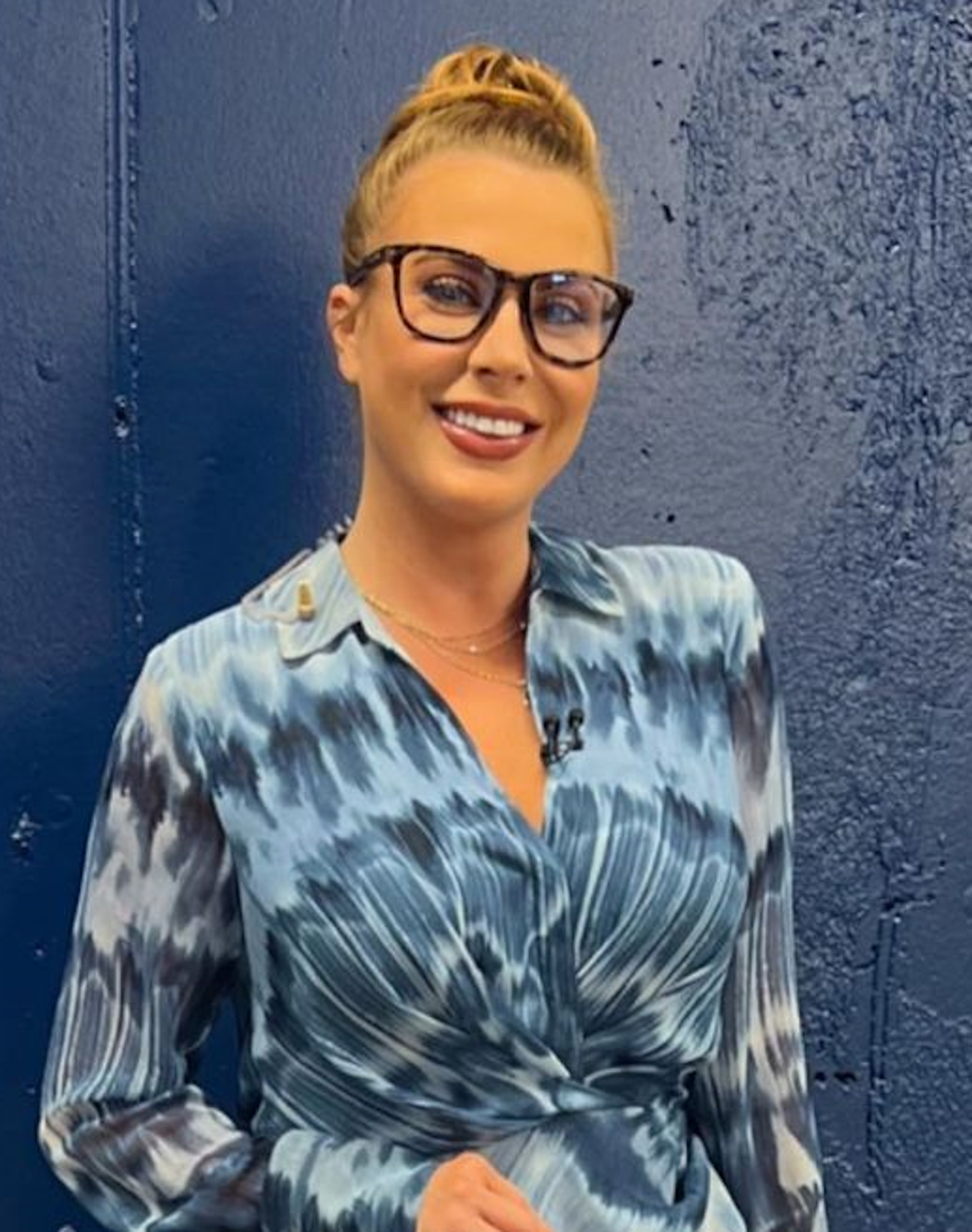
- Vincie in 2023
- Born: Kaitlyn Anne Vincie; December 10, 1987 (age 38); Harrisonburg, Virginia, U.S.
- Occupations: Television presenter, journalist
- Employer: Fox Sports

Kaitlyn Anne Vincie (born December 10, 1987) is an American sports presenter and journalist. She works for the Fox NASCAR team as a reporter and presents in their daily news and update show NASCAR Race Hub. Vincie's interest in stock car racing began when she was issued with a pit lane pass, and after graduation from Christopher Newport University, she worked as a reporter at Langley Speedway. She garnered attention after self-made video blogs on NASCAR were published on stock car racing website SceneDaily.

== Biography ==
Vincie was born on December 10, 1987, in Harrisonburg, Virginia, and was raised firstly in Bridgewater before her family moved to Warrenton when Vincie began high school. She is the daughter of John and Margaret Vincie, and has one older sister. Vincie's grandmother, Eleanor N. Logan, was a fifth-grade teacher, while her grandfather was part of the faculty of Bridgewater College. From an early age, she displayed an interest in journalism. Vincie attended John Wayland Elementary, Wilbur Pence Middle School, before graduating from Fauquier High School in 2006. She competed in track and field competitions, and worked as a manager for the school's wrestling team for four years. Vincie won the 800 meters event of the AAA Cedar Run District.

Having been drawn to sports journalism, Vincie authored stories for the high school paper and college paper. Journalist Al Pearce mentored her and provided her a large amount of information. She graduated from Christopher Newport University in 2010 with a bachelor's degree in communications. Vincie worked as an intern for the university's athletics department, and had a similar job for the USAR Pro Cup Series at Charlotte Motor Speedway. She wrote a senior dissertation on auto racing gender disparity which was focused on woman race car driver Danica Patrick, and became interested in the sport after she secured a pit lane pass for the NASCAR All-Star Race. She names Krista Voda and Wendy Venturini as her inspirations.

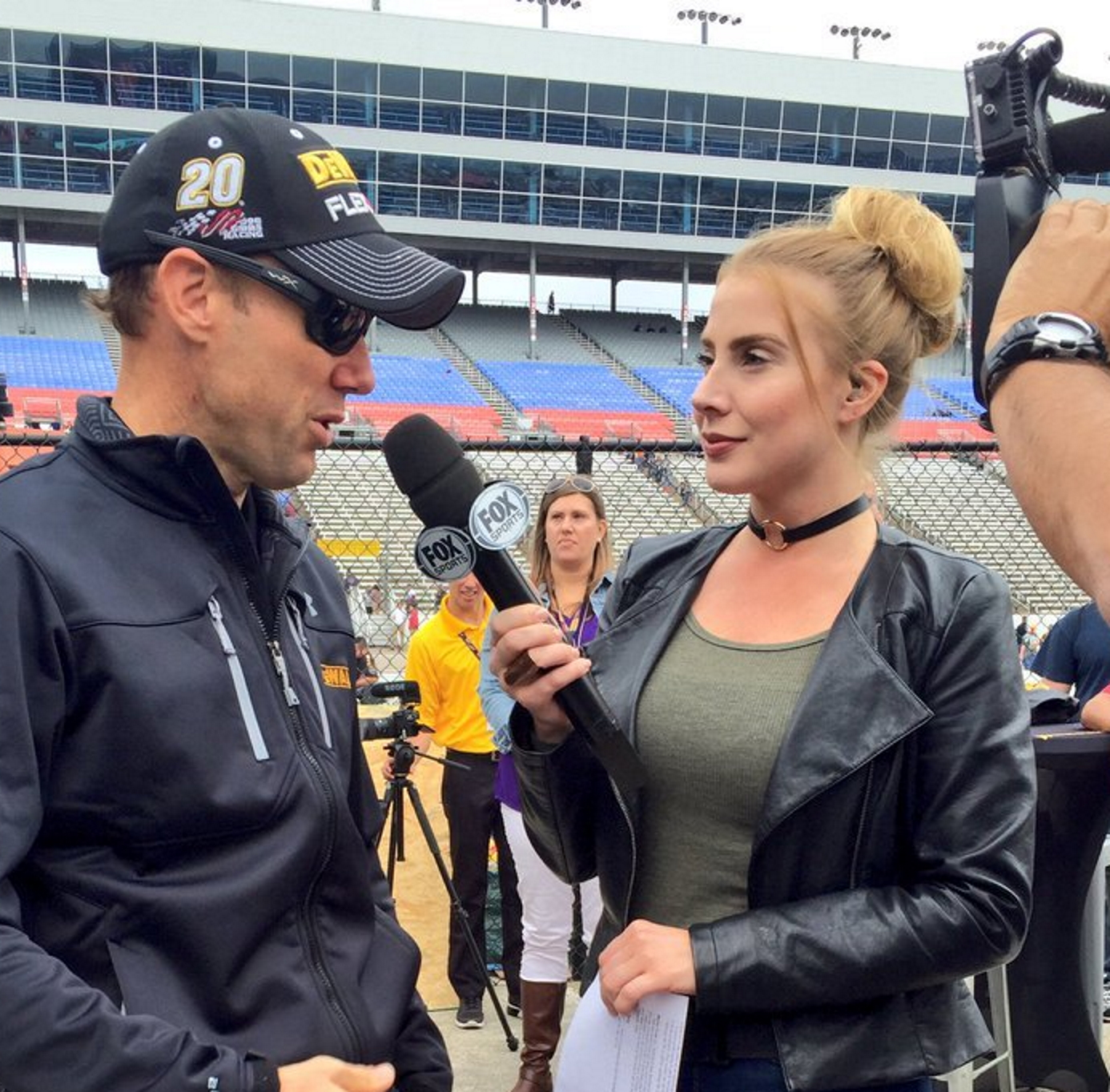
Vincie interviewing Matt Kenseth at Texas Motor Speedway in 2016

Vincie successfully auditioned for a job at Langley Speedway after a friend discovered the opportunity while browsing on Craigslist. During her time at Langley Speedway, she waited tables for three nights each week. She interviewed drivers for Langley Speedway TV which were telecast on local television station WSKY and on Cox on Demand. After the conclusion of her first racing season, Vincie became concerned over her future and chose to upload self-made NASCAR reports onto YouTube. She uploaded a video blog series aimed towards racing fans called Hot for NASCAR where she interviewed drivers and gave her opinions on the Sprint Cup Series. Vincie was assisted by producers from Langley Speedway who provided her with a chroma key and installed video equipment. She also studied computer software to allow her to edit her videos. The blogs achieved a large amount of success, that it caused stock car racing website SceneDaily to broadcast them on their site every week. Following her new popularity, Langley Speedway's management elected to keep her for the next racing season, after which she left. Vincie auditioned for Miss Sprint Cup in 2010 but did not make the final round.

Vincie subsequently worked as the marketing director for a Newport News–based tanning salon. She received an email from Speed who hired her as a social media reporter after a successful interview. She worked as part of Speed's Road Tour Team which involved on-camera work for several of the channel's programs dedicated to NASCAR. Vincie moved to Charlotte, North Carolina in the summer of 2012, and Speed placed her on their daily news and update show NASCAR Race Hub late in the season. She hosted a series called Women-In-Racing, and said her favorite segments were on Hendrick Motorsports tire specialist Lisa Smokstad, and Christina Rudisill, a race engineer for Richard Petty Motorsports.

Vincie was involved in Speed's coverage of the NASCAR Sprint Cup Series season-ending award banquet held in Las Vegas in 2012. Vincie started working as a pit lane reporter for K&N Pro Series East races on Fox Sports 1 in 2014, and was made a feature reporter on NASCAR Race Hub that same year. She received help from fellow pit lane reporter Steve Byrnes. Late in the 2014 season, she began working as a garage reporter for NASCAR Race Day and NASCAR Live. In addition, Vincie filed feature reports for Fox Sports 1's coverage of the Camping World Truck Series, and was the co-host of The Mock Run a view of the latest developments in NASCAR taken from a comedic point of view. She secured help from Fox writer Dave Vrable to assist her in writing scripts and jokes.

In January 2023, Vincie's first novel, Save The Queen City, was published.

== Personal life ==
She was married to Hendrick Motorsports crew chief Blake Harris. They have two children. In August 2025, she announced on Samantha Busch’s podcast that she and her husband have separated due to the stresses of their respective careers.

== See also ==
- List of Fox NASCAR broadcasters
