= Douglas Hunt =

Douglas Hunt may refer to:

- Douglas Hunt (footballer) (1914–1989), English footballer
- N. Douglas Hunt, American educator
- Douglas I. Hunt (1937–2024), American college football coach and politician
