= Wyatt Teller =

American football player (born 1994)

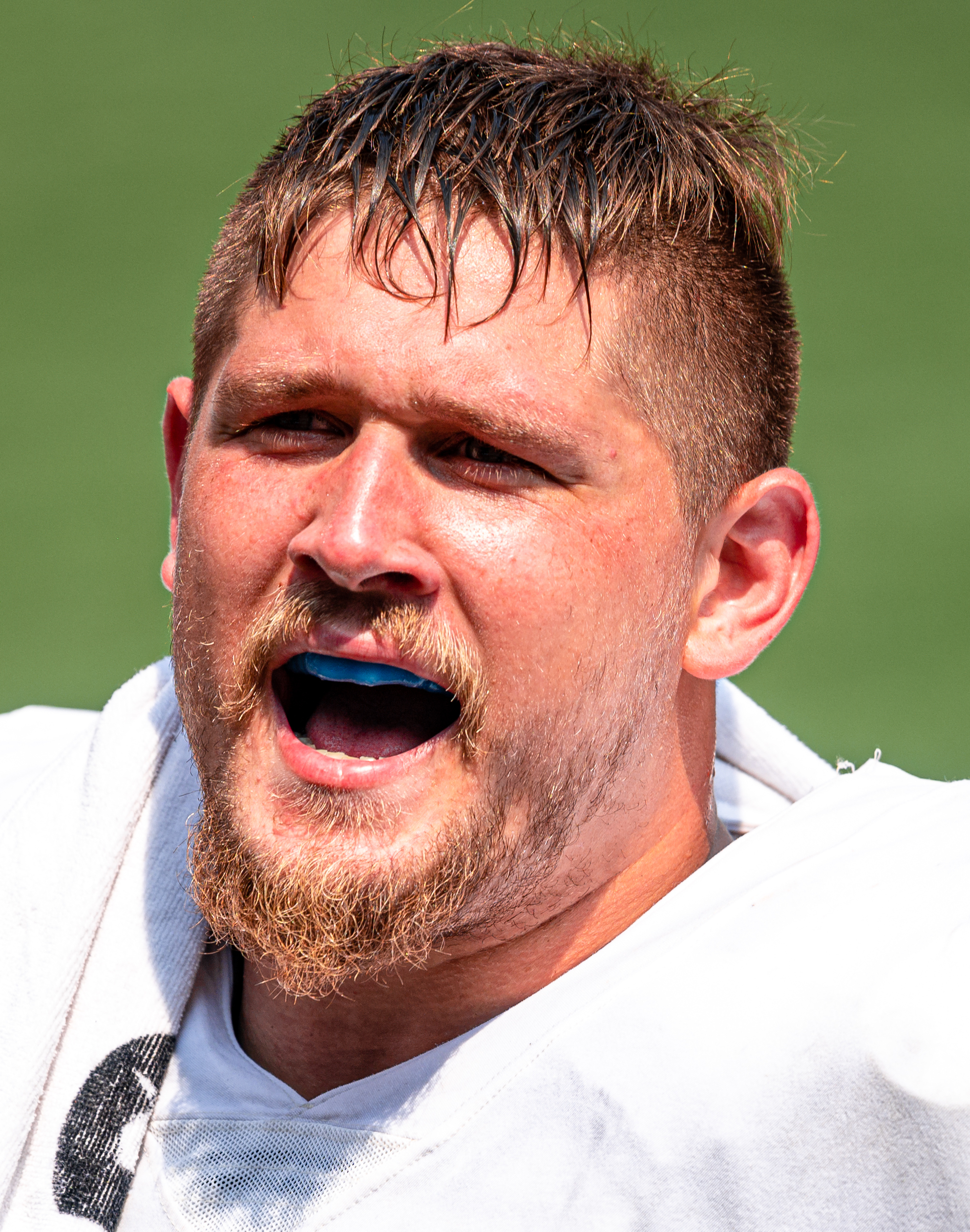
- Teller with the Cleveland Browns in 2025

No. 75 – Houston Texans
- Position: Guard
- Roster status: Active

Personal information
- Born: November 21, 1994 (age 31); Bealeton, Virginia, U.S.
- Listed height: 6 ft 4 in (1.93 m)
- Listed weight: 315 lb (143 kg)

Career information
- High school: Liberty (Bealeton)
- College: Virginia Tech (2013–2017)
- NFL draft: 2018: 5th round, 166th overall pick

Career history
- Buffalo Bills (2018); Cleveland Browns (2019–2025); Houston Texans (2026–present)

Awards and highlights
- 2× Second-team All-Pro (2020, 2021); 3× Pro Bowl (2021–2023); First-team All-ACC (2017)

Career NFL statistics as of Week 9, 2026
- Games played: 117
- Games started: 103
- Stats at Pro Football Reference

Wyatt Teller (born November 21, 1994) is an American professional football guard for the Houston Texans of the National Football League (NFL). He played college football for the Virginia Tech Hokies.

== College career ==
After high school, Teller committed to play football at Virginia Tech over at least 16 other Football Bowl Subdivision programs. After his senior season with the Hokies, Teller was named to the All-Atlantic Coast Conference (ACC) first team, as well as the runner up for the ACC Jacobs Blocking Trophy. He was also invited to the 2018 Senior Bowl.

== Professional career ==
=== Pre-draft ===
Pre-draft measurables
| Height | Weight | Arm length | Hand span | Wingspan | 40-yard dash | 10-yard split | 20-yard split | 20-yard shuttle | Three-cone drill | Vertical jump | Broad jump | Bench press |
|---|---|---|---|---|---|---|---|---|---|---|---|---|
| 6 ft 4 1/2 in (1.94 m) | 314 lb (142 kg) | 34 in (0.86 m) | 10 1/4 in (0.26 m) | 6 ft 9 7/8 in (2.08 m) | 5.24 s | 1.85 s | 3.06 s | 4.79 s | 7.45 s | 29.0 in (0.74 m) | 9 ft 6 in (2.90 m) | 30 reps |
All values from NFL Combine/Pro Day

After his senior season, Teller was invited to the 2018 NFL Combine, where he recorded the second best broad jump of all the offensive lineman as well as the fifth most bench press reps and fifth fastest 3-cone drill time.

=== Buffalo Bills ===
Teller was selected by the Buffalo Bills in the fifth round (166th overall) of the 2018 NFL draft. The Bills previously acquired the pick used to select Teller in a trade that sent Marcell Dareus to the Jacksonville Jaguars. He entered his rookie season as a backup guard, but then was named the starting left guard in Week 10, where he started the final seven games.

=== Cleveland Browns ===
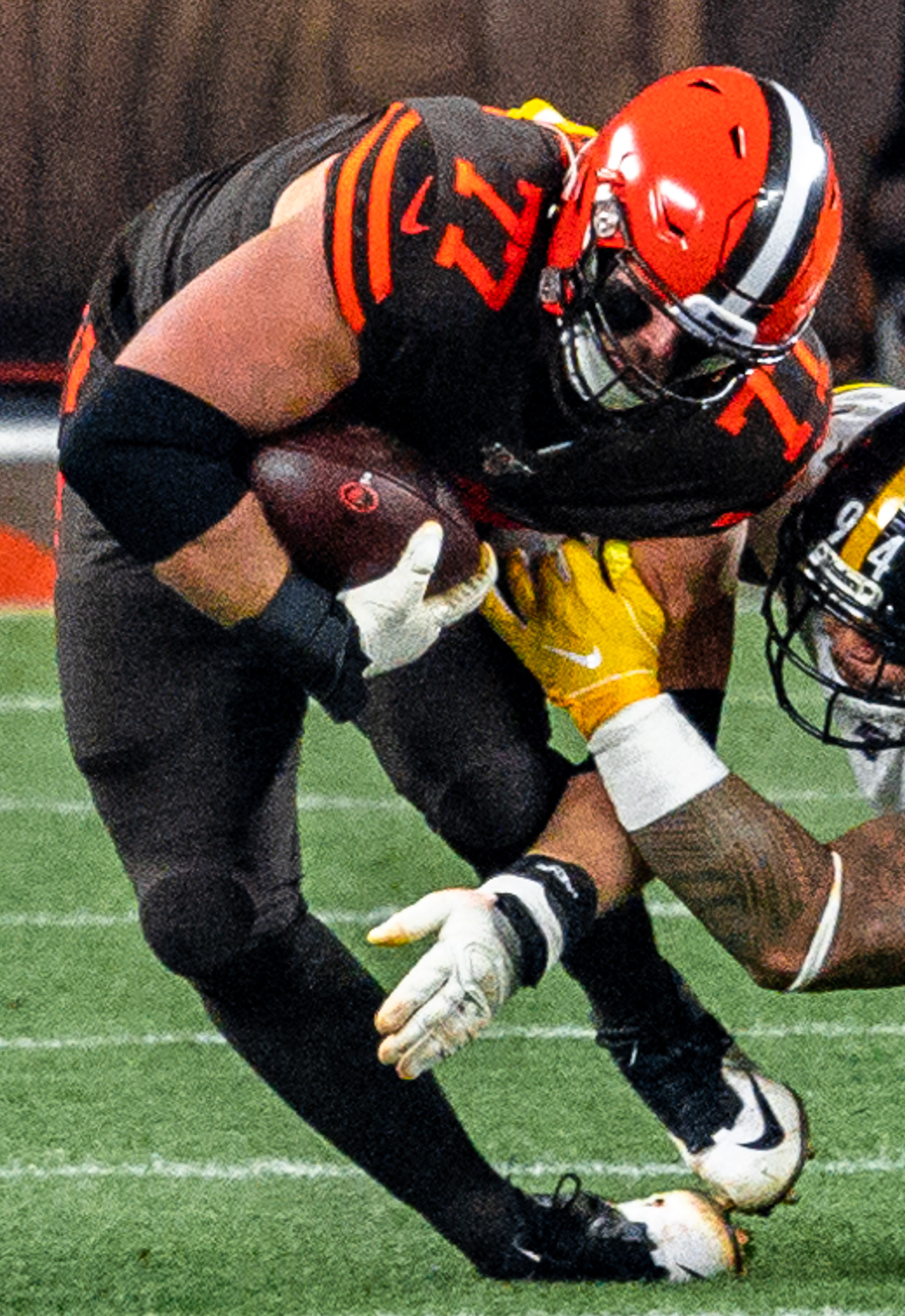
Teller with the Cleveland Browns in 2019

On August 29, 2019, Teller—along with a 2021 seventh-round pick—was traded to the Cleveland Browns for 2020 fifth- and sixth-round picks. After serving as a backup for the first half of his debut season in Cleveland, Teller earned a spot in the starting line up in Week 9, and went on to start the rest of the season. Heading into week five of the 2020 NFL season, NFL.com writer Nick Shook mentioned Teller as an MVP candidate for the performance of Cleveland's running game, mainly led by him and offensive tackle Jack Conklin. Teller was placed on the reserve/COVID-19 list by the team on December 8, 2020, and activated on December 13. Teller was named to the 2020 All-Pro Team, along with three of his teammates: defensive end Myles Garrett, tackle Jack Conklin, and fellow guard Joel Bitonio.

On November 9, 2021, Teller signed a four-year, $56.8 million contract extension with the Browns through the 2025 season.

In the 2021 season, Teller started in all 17 games. He earned his first Pro Bowl nomination. He was ranked 83rd by his fellow players on the NFL Top 100 Players of 2022. In the 2022 season, Teller made 15 appearances and starts. He earned a second Pro Bowl nomination following the 2022 season. In the 2023 season, Teller appeared in all 17 games and made 16 starts. He earned a third consecutive Pro Bowl nomination.

Teller started all 13 of his appearances for Cleveland during the 2025 season. On December 31, 2025, Teller was placed on season-ending injured reserve after reaggravating a calf injury in Week 17 against the Pittsburgh Steelers.

=== Houston Texans ===
On March 17, 2026, Teller signed a two-year, $16 million contract with the Houston Texans.
