= Maggie L. Walker Governor's School for Government and International Studies =

Public magnet high school in Richmond, Virginia

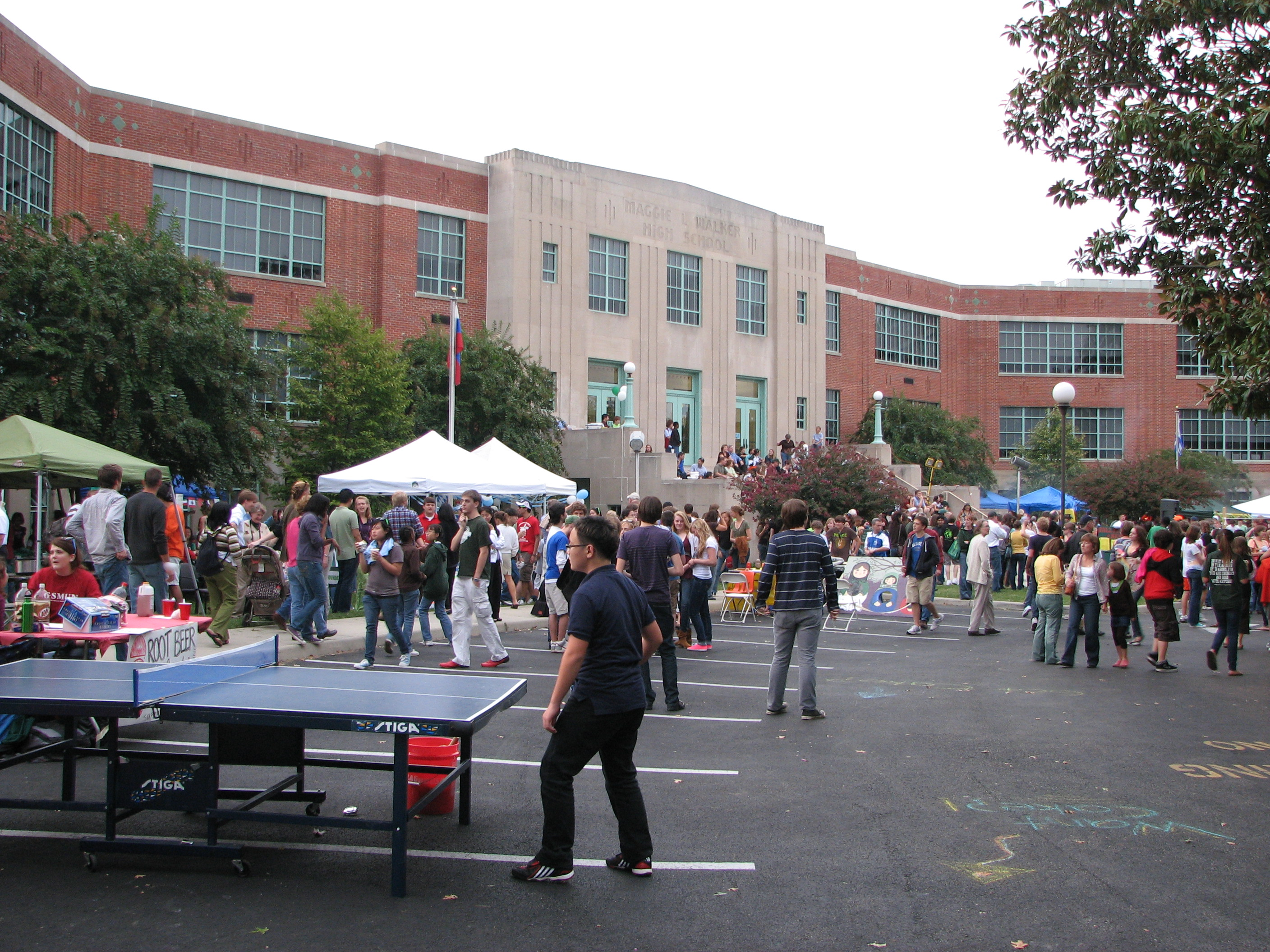

Location
- 1000 North Lombardy Street; Richmond, Virginia 23220; 37°33′28.5″N 77°27′13.5″W

Information
- School type: Public, Magnet high school
- Founded: 1991; 35 years ago
- Executive Director: Kristin K. Janssen
- Grades: 9–12
- Enrollment: 746 (2021)
- Colors: Green, gold, and white
- Athletics conference: Virginia High School League, Class 3 Region B
- Mascot: Green Dragon
- Rivals: Thomas Jefferson High School for Science and Technology
- Focus areas: Government and international studies
- Website: mlwgs.com
- Maggie L. Walker High School
- U.S. National Register of Historic Places
- Virginia Landmarks Register
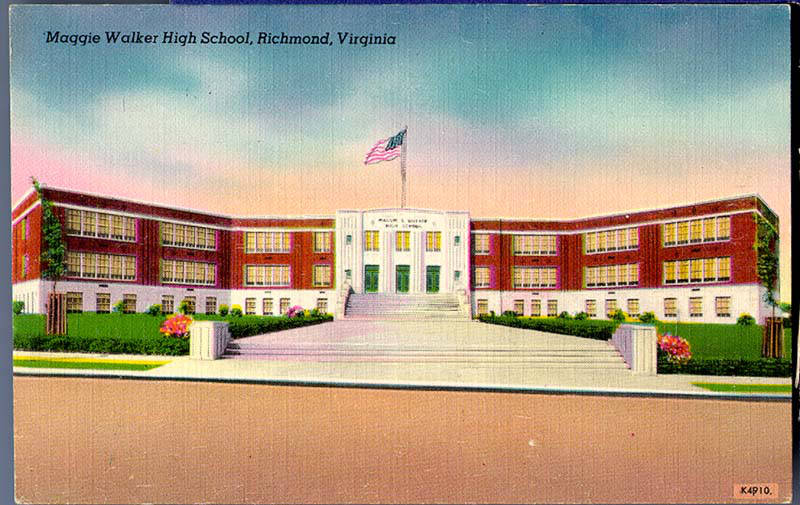
- The school in 1938
- Area: 12 acres (4.9 ha)
- Built: 1938
- Architect: Carneal, Johnston & Wright
- Architectural style: Art Deco
- NRHP reference No.: 98001160
- VLR No.: 127-0414

Significant dates
- Added to NRHP: September 9, 1998
- Designated VLR: June 17, 1998

The Maggie L. Walker Governor's School for Government and International Studies (MLWGS) is a public regional magnet high school in Richmond, Virginia, United States. Founded in 1991, it is one of Virginia's 18 Governor's Schools and draws students from 14 school divisions in the Richmond and Petersburg areas. Since 2001 it has occupied the former Maggie L. Walker High School, a 1938 Art Deco building listed on the National Register of Historic Places and named for Maggie Lena Walker, the first African-American woman to charter a bank in the United States. Kristin K. Janssen is the executive director.

== History ==
=== Maggie L. Walker High School ===
The original Maggie L. Walker High School opened in 1938 as a school for African-American students under segregation, in a building designed by Carneal, Johnston & Wright. Its alumni include civil rights lawyer and politician Henry L. Marsh, tennis champion Arthur Ashe, Pro Football Hall of Famer Willie Lanier, and Basketball Hall of Famer Bob Dandridge. The building was later abandoned by Richmond Public Schools and was added to the Virginia Landmarks Register and the National Register of Historic Places in 1998.

=== Governor's School ===
The Governor's School for Government and International Studies was founded in 1991 and initially shared the Thomas Jefferson High School building in Richmond's West End. Richmond Public Schools intended to phase out Thomas Jefferson and turn the building over to the Governor's School by 1995, but protests from Thomas Jefferson parents, students, alumni, and city officials led the district to reverse course in 1992, and the Governor's School began searching for a permanent home.

After several years of false starts and administrative turnover, the school acquired the vacant Maggie L. Walker High School building. Following a multimillion-dollar renovation, the Governor's School moved in for the fall of 2001 and took its current name. The Green Dragon mascot was adopted from the original Maggie L. Walker High School.

== Campus ==
The school occupies the renovated Maggie L. Walker High School building at 1000 North Lombardy Street in Richmond's Carver neighborhood, near the campus of Virginia Commonwealth University. The 12-acre site includes the 1938 Art Deco building, which is listed on the National Register of Historic Places.

== Organization and admissions ==
Each participating city or county funds the students it sends to the school and provides their transportation. The Governor's School sets an allotment for each locality, but each locality decides how many students it will send within that allotment. The regional school board that oversees the school consists of one school board member from each participating locality.

The 14 participating divisions are the counties of Charles City, Chesterfield, Dinwiddie, Goochland, Hanover, Henrico, King and Queen, New Kent, Powhatan, and Prince George, and the cities of Colonial Heights, Hopewell, Petersburg, and Richmond.

Students apply during eighth grade and may apply only once. Applicants must be enrolled in Algebra I or a higher mathematics course and must have earned a B average in core subjects in seventh grade. Applications are scored on grades, course rigor, teacher recommendations, and a regional evaluation session that includes a timed essay; the school scores the applications, but each home division selects its own students based on those scores and available funding. About 1,200 eighth graders apply each year for a freshman class of roughly 190.

== Academics ==
The school is known for a demanding curriculum, strong performance in academic competitions, and high rates of admission to selective universities. Its focus areas are government and international studies, with extensive course offerings in world languages and social studies; students must study more than one language to graduate. A Governor's School diploma requires a minimum of 31 credits, including a senior seminar and mentorship, and meets or exceeds the requirements for a Virginia advanced studies diploma. Students also take Advanced Placement courses and dual enrollment courses through a partnership with Virginia Commonwealth University, which also gives them access to the university library system; seven dual-enrollment courses were offered in 2023–24.

The class of 2025 had 193 graduates, including eight National Merit finalists and 42 commended students, with an average SAT score of 1356 and average ACT score of 30. Newsweek listed the school among its "Public Elites" annually from 2006 to 2010, and The Daily Beast ranked it 10th nationally and 7th in the South in 2014.

== Athletics ==
The Green Dragons compete in the Virginia High School League in Class 3, Region B. The school moved from Class 2 to Class 3 after the 2019 season because of its growing enrollment. It offers the following sports; it does not field a football team.

- Baseball (boys)
- Basketball (boys, girls)
- Cross country (boys, girls)
- Dance (coed)
- Field hockey (girls)
- Golf (coed)
- Soccer (boys, girls)
- Softball (girls)
- Swimming (boys, girls)
- Tennis (boys, girls)
- Track and field (indoor and outdoor; boys, girls)
- Volleyball (boys, girls)
- Wrestling (coed)

=== State championships ===
The boys' cross country team won the VHSL Group AAA state championship in 2001 under head coach Jim Holdren, and the girls' team was Group AAA runner-up in 2010. In 2013–14, the boys' and girls' cross country teams, the boys' and girls' indoor track teams, the boys' outdoor track team, and the girls' swim team all won Group A state championships. The baseball team won the school's first baseball state title in 2016, defeating Goochland 3–1 in the Group 2A final, and the boys' soccer team won the Class 2 state championship in 2017. The girls' cross country team won the Class 3 state championship in 2019.

== Student activities ==
All students must complete 140 hours of community service to receive a Governor's School diploma, and school clubs regularly take part in neighborhood cleanup projects. The class of 2025 performed 41,169 hours of community service. The school hosts visiting speakers on government and international affairs, including ambassadors and public officials.

== Alumni ==
- Arthur Ashe, three-time Grand Slam singles champion and International Tennis Hall of Fame inductee; attended the original Maggie L. Walker High School
- Willie Lanier (class of 1963), Pro Football Hall of Fame linebacker for the Kansas City Chiefs and Super Bowl IV champion
- Bob Dandridge (class of 1965), two-time NBA champion and Naismith Memorial Basketball Hall of Fame inductee
- Emmanuel Pratt (class of 1995), urban designer, co-founder of the Sweet Water Foundation, and 2019 MacArthur Fellow
- Sara Schaefer (class of 1996), Emmy Award-winning writer and comedian
- Colin Van Ostern (class of 1996), former member of the New Hampshire Executive Council and 2016 Democratic nominee for Governor of New Hampshire
- Mohammad Alavi (class of 1998), video game designer known for his work on the Call of Duty and Titanfall series
- Jenny Han (class of 1998), New York Times bestselling author of To All the Boys I've Loved Before and The Summer I Turned Pretty
- Jillian Johnson (class of 1999), member of the Durham City Council from 2015 to 2023 and Mayor Pro Tempore from 2017 to 2021
- Jamey Stegmaier (class of 1999), founder of Stonemaier Games and designer of Scythe
- Esther Erb (class of 2004), long-distance runner and 2014 USA Marathon champion
- Marguerite Bennett (class of 2006), comic book writer for DC Comics and Marvel Comics
- Cheta Emba (class of 2011), rugby player who represented the United States at the 2020 Summer Olympics
- Lucy Dacus (class of 2013), Grammy Award-winning musician and member of Boygenius

== See also ==
- Appomattox Regional Governor's School for the Arts and Technology
- Governor's Schools (Virginia)
- N. Douglas Hunt, executive director from 2002 to 2009
