= Holdren =

Holdren is a surname. Notable people with the surname include:

- Dax Holdren (born 1972), American beach volleyball player
- Jim Holdren (born 1942), American track and field coach
- John Holdren (born 1944), American scientist, writer and presidential advisor
- Judd Holdren (1915–1974), American actor
