= Vaquera (fashion brand) =

American ready-to-wear fashion brand

Vaquera is an American ready-to-wear fashion label. The label was founded by Patric DiCaprio and Bryn Taubensee. Vaquera was nominated for the 2017 Edition of the CFDA/Vogue Fashion Fund.

Vaquera is known for its dadaist, D.I.Y. sensibilities and "fashion fan fiction" pieces such as the Tiffany and Co. bag dress, loose, oversized garments, and bra t-shirts.

== History ==
The label was founded in 2013 by Alabama-born Patric DiCaprio, with co-designers Bryn Taubensee, Claire Sullivan, and David Moses working alongside the brand throughout the 2010s. Bryn Taubensee has stayed as the brand's co-creative director. Emma Wyman is the brand's stylist and Walter Pearce is the brand's casting director.

Devotees of the label include Rihanna, Tessa Thompson, Travis Barker, Emily Ratajkowski, Ella Emhoff, Emma Davidson, Tess McMillan, Jacob Bixenman, Sam Penn, and Charli XCX.

== Collaborations ==
Vaquera periodically collaborates with various arts and culture entities. In June 2017, the brand collaborated with Hulu's The Handmaid's Tale to create a runway collection. In 2020, Dover Street Market New York hosted the designers’ February runway show and subsequently joined Dover's Paris-based showroom-cum-incubator which also includes Eli Russell Linnetz, Rassvet, and Honey Dijon.
