= Emmanuel Pratt =

American Urban Designer (born 1995)

Emmanuel Pratt is an American Urban Designer. In 2009 he co-founded the Sweet Water Foundation, which practices "Regenerative Neighborhood Development" on the South Side of Chicago. The foundation is centered around bringing inter-generational members of the community together for education and to work on urban agriculture and reclaiming abandoned properties and transforming them into productive landscapes.

== Biography ==
Pratt was born in Virginia and graduated in 1995 from Maggie L. Walker Governor's School in Richmond, Virginia. In 1999, he graduated with a Bachelors of Architecture from Cornell University, and he received a Masters of Science in architecture and urban design from Columbia University in 2003. From 2016 to 2017, Pratt was a Loeb Fellow at Harvard University Graduate School of Design.

From 2011 to 2018, Pratt was director of the aquaponics program at Chicago State University. He was the Charles Moore Visiting Professor at the Taubman College of Architecture and Urban Planning at the University of Michigan, and is a visiting lecturer in Environmental and Urban Studies at the University of Chicago.

In 2019, Pratt was invited to participate in the third Chicago Architecture Biennial, where his entry Reroot + Redux explored the connections between architecture and the Great Migration. Pratt was also named a MacArthur Fellow.
