= Governor's School of Southside Virginia =

Magnet school in Virginia, United States

Coordinates: 36.838828°N 77.917739°W

Information
- School type: Magnet high school

The Governor's School of Southside Virginia is a public magnet high school in Keysville, Virginia and Alberta, Virginia. The Governor's School of Southside Virginia is located at Southside Virginia Community College—John H. Daniel campus just outside Keysville, Virginia and the Christanna campus near Alberta, Virginia. It is one of 18 magnet Governor's Schools in Virginia.

The Governor's School of Southside Virginia covers the counties of Amelia, Brunswick, Buckingham, Charlotte, Cumberland, Greensville, Lunenburg, Mecklenburg, Nottoway, and Prince Edward.
