= Chesapeake Bay Governor's School for Marine and Environmental Science =

High school in Virginia, United States

Location
- Tappahannock, Virginia; United States; 37°57′26.6″N 76°45′29.4″W

Information
- School type: Public school (government funded), Regional Magnet school
- Established: 1998
- Director: Rob Wright
- Grades: 10-12
- Campuses: Bowling Green, Virginia; Glenns, Virginia; Warsaw, Virginia
- Website: http://www.cbgs.k12.va.us/

The Chesapeake Bay Governor's School for Marine Environmental Science (CBGS) is a public regional magnet high school. Its main building is located in Tappahannock, Virginia, directed by Dr. Rob Wright.

According to the main site, "The Chesapeake Bay Governor's School for Marine and Environmental Science provides a community of learners the opportunity to explore connections among the environment, math, science, and technology -- developing leaders who possess the research and technical skills, global perspective, and vision needed to address the challenges of a rapidly changing society."

== Participating school systems ==
One of the 18 Virginia Governor's Schools, it draws students from 13 school districts divided among three sites:

=== Bowling Green Site ===
- Caroline
- King George
- King William

=== Glenns Site ===
- Middlesex
- King & Queen
- Gloucester
- Mathews
- New Kent

=== Warsaw Site ===
- Essex
- Lancaster
- Northumberland
- Richmond
- Westmoreland
- Colonial Beach

== Organization ==
There are three sites linked to the Chesapeake Bay Governor's School: Bowling Green site, located at the Caroline County School Board building; Glenns site, located at Rappahannock Community College's Glenns campus; and Warsaw Site, also located at Rappahannock Community College's Warsaw campus.

The sites generally remain separate, however there are occasional "all-site" days where students from all three sites are able to join collectively to perform an activity, often an educational field trip.

== Courses offered ==
Students take a combination of the following courses:

=== Sophomore Class ===
- College Biology
- Algebra III
- Foundations of Science

=== Junior Class ===
- College Chemistry
- Pre-Calculus and Trigonometry
- Marine and Environmental Science I

=== Senior Class ===
- College Physics
- Marine and Environmental Science II
- Calculus

All courses meet and/or exceed the Standards of Learning requirements. In addition, students earn dual enrollment credits for each course through Rappahannock Community College.

== Community service ==
To foster community improvement efforts, Governor's School students are encouraged to complete 120 hours of community service by graduation. School clubs frequently participate in neighborhood projects. All community service and credits must be completed by graduation to be recognized and to receive the Community Service Award.
