= Southwest Virginia Governor's School for Science, Mathematics, and Technology =

Location
- 5251 College Drive; Dublin, Virginia, Virginia 24084; United States; 37°3′31.9″N 80°46′45.9″W

Information
- School type: Public school (government funded), Magnet school
- Motto: Setting the pace for excellence in Southwest Virginia.
- Established: 1990
- Director: Rebecca Phillips
- Grades: 11-12
- Enrollment: 152
- Colors: Blue, White, Gold
- Website: http://www.swvgs.us/

The Southwest Virginia Governor's School for Science, Mathematics, and Technology is one of Virginia's 18 state-initiated magnet Governor's Schools. It is a part-time school where 11th and 12th grade students take advanced classes in the morning (receiving their remaining classes from their home high school.)

The school utilizes the combined resources of the participating school divisions to provide programs which facilitate the acquisition of scientific and technical knowledge through laboratory investigation and research. Students attend the Governor's School for half a day to take science, math, and research classes before returning to their neighborhood high schools. While all classes in the program satisfy high school requirements, they all count for college credit too.

The program's approach combines traditional classroom and laboratory training with specialized experiences such as visits from successful scientists and universities, unique internships, and various field research.

== Faculty ==
Name	Position	Degree
Mrs. Rebecca Phillips	Director, Biology Instructor	Masters of Science, Biology
Mrs. Sherry Pugh	Assistant Director, Mathematics Instructor	Masters of Science, Mathematics
Dr. Matthew Frazier	Physics and Astronomy Instructor	Doctors of Science, Physics
Mr. Jared Brown	Chemistry Instructor	Masters of Science, Chemistry
Mr. Greg Riffe	Mathematics Instructor	Masters of Science, Mathematics
Mrs. Megan Arnold	Guidance Counselor	Masters of Education, School Counseling
Mr. Sam Muriello	Mathematics Instructor	Masters of Science, Mathematics
Mr. Matthew Frazier	Physics and Astronomy Instructor	Master of Science, Flagellar Propulsion

== Participating school systems ==
- Carroll County
- Floyd County
- Galax City
- Giles County
- Montgomery County
- Pulaski County
- Radford City
- Smyth County
- Wythe County

== Offered courses ==
- College Chemistry
- College Physics
- Pre-Calculus
- AP Statistics/Research
- College Biology
- University Physics
- Applied Calculus
- Engineering Calculus
- Advanced Calculus
- Vector Calculus
- Differential Equations
- Linear Algebra
- Analytic Geometry
- Introduction to Microcomputer Software
- AP Environmental Science
- Anatomy/Physiology
- Organic Chemistry
- Astronomy
