= Kettle Run High School (Nokesville, Virginia) =

Coordinates: 38°43′58″N 77°40′51.15″W

Location
- 7403 Academic Avenue; Nokesville, Virginia 20181

Information
- School type: Public high school
- Established: 2008
- School district: Fauquier County Public Schools
- NCES District ID: 510132002785
- Superintendent: Major Warner
- Principal: Amanda Dorr
- Staff: 120
- Grades: 9–12
- Enrollment: 1,175 (2024-25)
- Language: English
- Campus: Suburban
- Colors: Green, Orange
- Mascot: Cougars
- Feeder schools: Auburn Middle School; W.C.Taylor Middle School & Marshall Middle
- Rival Schools: Fauquier High School; Brentsville District High School; James Monroe High School; Liberty High School
- Athletic Conference: Evergreen District; Region IV
- Website: Kettle Run HS

Kettle Run High School is a public high school in Nokesville, Virginia. The school is part of Fauquier County Public Schools and is located at 7403 Academic Avenue, Nokesville, VA. It has an enrollment of a little more than 1,200 students. The graduating class of 2015 consisted of 281 seniors. Kettle Run feeds into Mountain Vista Governor's School.

== History ==
Kettle Run High School opened in 2008 as the third high school in Fauquier County, with students zoned for Kettle Run transferring from Fauquier High School and Liberty High School. The location in the eastern part of the county is experiencing the highest rate of growth in the county. In the first year of operation there was no senior class, making 2010 the first graduating class.

== Accreditation ==
Kettle Run High School is fully accredited by the Virginia Department of Education and the Southern Association of Colleges and Schools.

== Extracurricular ==
The mascot is a Cougar and the sports teams currently play in the AA Evergreen District and AA Region II. Kettle Run offers Competition Cheer, Cross Country, Field Hockey, Football, Golf, Volleyball, Basketball, Swimming, Winter Track, Track & Field, Wrestling, Baseball, Lacrosse, Soccer, Softball, and Tennis. In addition to physical sports, Kettle Run also offers Academic Team, Esports, Technology Student Association, and Model UN.

Kettle Run's marching band program has been around since the school's establishment in 2008, winning "Superior" awards nearly every year since 2008.
