= Blue Ridge Virtual Governor's School =

Blue Ridge Virginia Governor's School
- Multiple Districts, Virginia

Information
- Established: 2000
- School board: Joint School Board
- Director: Wanda Elliott
- Grades: 9–12
- Enrollment: 618 (as of 2023)
- Website: http://www.brvgs.k12.va.us/

The Blue Ridge Virginia Governor's School ("BRVGS") is a Virginia Academic Year Governor's School available to public high school students enrolled in the counties of Fluvanna, Goochland, Greene, Louisa, Madison, Nelson and Orange in central Virginia. BRVGS emphasizes technology, science, mathematics, and the development of skills such as collaboration, problem-solving, communication, ethics, and the effective use of technology.

== Program details ==
=== Organization ===
BRVGS students take all BRVGS courses at their own local high school, but collaborate with their fellow students in other schools on projects, debates, experiments and field trips. In the early days of the program, instructional collaboration was accomplished through video conferencing. Today, most collaboration between students (and teachers) is accomplished through the Google Apps for Education platform, which provides students with shared online documents, chat and email to accomplish their learning.

=== Leadership ===
BRVGS is administered by a Joint School Board, consisting of superintendents and board members from each participating county. The program's Director is Wanda Elliott, whose educational experience includes service as a high school math teacher and principal. The program's Instructional Technology Resource Specialist is Sallie Hill Outten, a former high school science teacher and school technology resource teacher. Ms. Hill Outten holds the distinction of being the first Google-Certified Teacher in Virginia.

=== Selection process ===
The BRVGS program currently allots eighteen new 9th grade slots to each member school district per year, with more slots allotted for larger schools. Students from participating counties normally apply as 8th graders, through a multi-faceted application process that includes testing, interviews, writing and review of past grade performance and accomplishments. The top eighteen applications per school are selected for that governors school class. Once applicants have been accepted to the BRVGS program, they generally remain in BRVGS through their entire high school education. Students must maintain high grades and good disciplinary records at their local school or risk not being able to continue the program.

== Courses ==
=== Current courses ===
Blue Ridge Virginia Governors School students take a different BRVGS course in each year of high school, in most cases. Freshmen normally take World History I and II, with an emphasis on technology in history. Sophomores take AP Biology and collaborate with Virginia Tech to study Arabidopsis thaliana under multiple experimental conditions. Some of this research has contributed to an article in the journal Plant Physiology. Juniors choose from almost 30 different online courses. Seniors participate in a highly individualized internship, research and community service project. BRVGS students also have access to college elective courses, such as "Intro to Engineering" and "Digital Technology and Communication" through the University of Virginia and "Science in the Popular Novel" through James Madison University.

=== Past courses ===
The BRVGS program originally had Sophomores participate in Biotechnology classes instead of the current AP Biology course. Goochland and Nelson county ran AP Biology courses during the 2011–2012 school year, and the rest of the counties soon followed, adopting the new course starting in the 2012-2013 year. The program retains a focus on technology however, with students writing papers on Biotechnology and Bioethics subjects as an addition to the standard curriculum.
