= Governor's Foreign Language Academies =

Starting in 1986, the Virginia Department of Education has sponsored Governor's Foreign Language Academies, summer residential programs for Virginia's most motivated and talented foreign language students. As of 2006, approximately 6,600 students have completed one of the six programs, housed at Virginia Commonwealth University, Richmond: immersion programs in French, German, and Spanish, an intensive Latin program, and partial-immersion programs in Russian and Japanese. Virginia Commonwealth University offers concurrent STARTALK summer programs in Chinese and Arabic.

The six governor's academies maintain their individuality and offer activities to expand global awareness, multi-cultural understanding, and international education. The three immersion academies provide an intensive experience and unique challenge for students who have excelled in language study to continue their study of that language in a total immersion environment, which is generally unavailable in the regular school environment. The Latin Academy provides an intensive experience for students who have excelled in the study of Latin to continue their study in a milieu unavailable in the regular school environment and introduces the students to classical Greek. The partial-immersion programs in Japanese and Russian, as well as the STARTALK programs in Chinese and Arabic, provide an opportunity for interested students to be introduced to these cultures and languages, which are not widely taught across the Commonwealth. Beginning with the summer of 2011, the Commonwealth of Virginia ceded sponsorship of the Russian Academy to Virginia Commonwealth University.

The success of the pilot Virginia's Governor's Foreign Language Academies is influencing other states into starting similar programs to encourage excellence in foreign languages.

== Activities ==
Initially, each academy was held at a separate college or university in Virginia; however, from 2004 until 2010, all academies were held at Virginia Commonwealth University in Richmond Virginia. In 2011, once again, the academies dispersed throughout the commonwealth. In 2012, The Japanese and Latin Academies will be hosted by Randolph-Macon College, in Ashland Virginia. French, Spanish, and German Academies will occur at Washington & Lee University in Lexington, Virginia. Highlights of the programs include day trips, such as to Washington, D.C. to see various museums, academic, and/or cultural institutions that correspond to the respective foreign languages, outings to the Virginia Museum of Fine Arts, or the archaeological sites at Jamestown.

== See also ==
- Governor's Schools (Virginia)
