= Appomattox Regional Governor's School for the Arts and Technology =

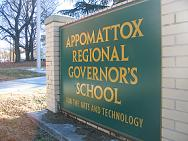

Location
- 512 West Washington Street; Petersburg, Virginia 23803; United States; 37°13′32″N 77°24′41″W

Information
- School type: Public, Magnet high school
- Motto: Create. Lead. Inspire. Achieve.
- Founded: September 7, 1999
- Area trustee: Chesterfield County
- Executive Director: Meagan Tenia
- Grades: 9–12
- Enrollment: 350 to 380
- Language: English
- Campus: Urban, Historic
- Colors: Hunter Green, Gold and Burgundy
- Mascot: Dragon (Argy D'Dragono)
- Focus Areas: Dance, Literary Arts, Instrumental and Vocal Music, Musical Theatre, Theatre, Technical Theatre, Technology, Visual Arts
- Website: www.args.us

The Appomattox Regional Governor's School for the Arts and Technology (locally and colloquially sometimes known as ARGS, Appomattox, or the Governor's School) is a public regional magnet high school in downtown Petersburg, Virginia, United States. One of 18 Virginia Governor's Schools, it draws students from 14 localities: Chesterfield, Richmond, Petersburg, Dinwiddie, Colonial Heights, Hopewell, Prince George, Powhatan, Sussex, Surry, Charles City, Amelia, Southampton, and Franklin City.

== Organization ==
Formerly fiscally run by the Petersburg school district, ARGS is now under the fiscal control of Chesterfield County. It receives approximately $9000 for each student from their home districts. The other primary sources of funding are private grants, federal grants, state money, and individual donations. The school has a Governing Board, composed of representatives or superintendents from each participating district, that functions in much the same role as a school board but also rules on admissions and other school-specific issues.

== History ==
Its official opening as the Petersburg high school, slated for 1918, was postponed and was tasked as an auxiliary morgue during the 1918 influenza pandemic. The school closed in 1974 and sat unused from the mid-1980s until it was extensively renovated and opened as the Appomattox Regional Governor's School, located at 512 W. Washington Street in downtown Petersburg, Virginia.

The building first opened its doors as ARGS on Tuesday, September 7, 1999. For the first operating year, the school was home to nearly 90 students in the ninth and tenth grades. Currently the school serves approximately 350 students in grades 9–12, with an ever-increasing student population.

== Academics ==
Once accepted into the school, students must maintain a GPA of 2.5 and conform to all of the standards of the regional board. The student is required to maintain good academic standing and may remain in the school as long as they reside in a participating school district and funding school. The school also teaches dual enrollment.

=== Specialized classes ===
In addition to the common core classes, ARGS offers specific "Courses" in specialized classes for a student's focus area. These include:

- Performing Arts: musical theatre, theatre arts, technical theatre, modern dance, jazz dance, ballet, vocal music, instrumental music, music technology and piano performance.
- Visual Arts: sculpture, painting, drawing, graphic design, photography, and film studies.
- Literary Arts: poetry, fiction, and non-fiction.
- Technology: computer programming and engineering.

== Athletics ==
ARGS offers its students seven sports with nine teams. Fall sports include: golf (coed), volleyball (girls), and cross country (girls/boys). Winter sports are basketball (girls/boys) and cheerleading (coed). ARGS offers two spring sports: soccer (coed) and tennis (girls/boys). ARGS is a Virginia 1-A school. Part of the Tri-Rivers District, ARGS competes in conference 41 eastern region.

== Selection process ==
All students who are accepted into ARGS are required to have at least a B average in the seventh grade. They are also required to have completed Algebra I by their ninth-grade year although occasionally exceptions will be made and an Algebra course outside of school will be assigned. It is highly recommended that applicants have completed a course in Dance, Art, and/or Music, Basic Computer Science, and a Foreign Language. Students are required to apply and go through an adjudication process. This process consists of an interview with the department head of the focus area in which the student is applying and possibly an audition, depending on the department.

== ARGS Residency ==
The Appomattox Regional Governor's School for the arts and technology offers an opportunity to emerging and established writers an experience through The Alumni House.

== Notable alumni ==
- Sam Pinkleton (class of 2005), Tony Award winning director and choreographer of Oh, Mary, Natasha, Pierre, and the Great Comet of 1812, and the 2025 revival of The Rocky Horror Picture Show
- Kris Roberts (class of 2005), Broadway performer
- Matt Garstka (class of 2007), drummer
- Colin Pastore (class of 2007), music producer
- Mary Page Nance (class of 2008), Broadway performer
- Claire Sullivan (class of 2012), fashion designer
- Arianna Moore (class of 2016), executive director of the Latin Ballet of Virginia
- Dexter Moses (class of 2017), saxophonist
- Carrie Brockwell (class of 2024), American Idol alum and award winning singer-songwriter
- Hollie Hammel, musician
- Sidney Nicole Rogers, Lifetime actress

== See also ==
- Governor's Schools (Virginia)
