= Fauquier County Public Schools =

School division in Warrenton, Virginia, United States

Address
- 320 Hospital Drive Warrenton, Virginia, 20186; United States
- Coordinates: 38.7157°N 77.8119°W

District information
- Type: Public school division
- Grades: Pre-K–12
- Established: 1963; 63 years ago
- Superintendent: Dr. Major Warner

Students and staff
- Enrollment: 11,287
- Staff: 1,883

Other information
- Website: www.fcps1.org

The Fauquier County Public Schools system (abbreviated FCPS) is a school division in the U.S. commonwealth of Virginia. It is a branch of the Fauquier County government which administers public schools in Fauquier County.

It covers all parts of the county except for those on Marine Corps Base Quantico, which instead is within the Department of Defense Education Activity (DoDEA) school district.

FCPS enrolls approximately 11,287 students in 20 schools (11 elementary schools, 5 middle schools, 3 high schools, 1 alternative learning school). The school board is currently led by Chairman Donna Grove, appointed in 2008. The school system finished with a graduation rate of 95.5% for the class of 2017.

== High schools ==
- Fauquier High School
- Liberty High School
- Southeastern Alternative School
- Kettle Run High School
- Mountain Vista Governor's School

== Middle schools ==
- Auburn Middle School
- Cedar Lee Middle School
- W. C. Taylor Middle School
- Marshall Middle School

== Elementary schools ==
- C. M. Bradley Elementary School
- James G. Brumfield Elementary School
- W. G. Coleman Elementary School
- Grace Miller Elementary School
- H. M. Pearson Elementary School
- C. Hunter Ritchie Elementary School
- P. B. Smith Elementary School
- Claude Thompson Elementary School
- Mary Walter Elementary School
- Greenville Elementary School
- M. M. Pierce Elementary School
