= Governor's Schools (Virginia) =

Magnet high school system in Virginia, U.S.

The Governor's Schools are a collection of regional magnet high schools and summer programs in the Commonwealth of Virginia intended for gifted students.

Virginia Governor's Schools provide some of the state's most able students academically and artistically challenging programs beyond those offered in their home schools. With the support of the Virginia Board of Education and the General Assembly, the Governor's Schools currently serve in their various forms around 1000 gifted students from all parts of the commonwealth.

== History ==
The concept of the Governor's School actually started as a three-year grant funded program in Stafford County, Virginia, from 1970 - 1972. One hundred Stafford public high school students were selected as "day students" and 100 public high school students from across the state were invited to be "on campus" students and were housed at the then Mary Washington College in Fredericksburg, Virginia. Shirley C. Heim, Stafford County administrative assistant to the superintendent of schools, envisioned a program where the average person would be exposed to the arts. The original title was "the Humanities Institute." Heim, under the supervision of Superintendent Andrew Wright, persuasively argued that Stafford County, culturally wiped out after the American Civil War, was more culturally deprived than Appalachia. Her argument helped secure the three year federally-funded grant program. After a three-year program ended, the Virginia Department of Education, supported by Governor Linwood Holton, evolved the program away from the arts to include science, technology, and journalism.

In 1973, at the behest of Governor Holton, the first incarnation of the Governor's School program included summer residential sessions for 400 gifted students from across the commonwealth. The first summer residential Governor's Schools were held in 1973 at Mary Baldwin College, Mary Washington College, and the Science Museum in Richmond. Isabelle P. Rucker, Director of Special Programs for the Gifted, oversaw the residential sessions until her retirement in the fall of 1979, and served as a mentor to both faculty and students for many years. Since its beginning, the program has expanded to more than 40 sites throughout the commonwealth. Summer residential sessions are still offered, but many other programs have been developed, including the two flagship schools described below.

== Academic-year Governor's Schools ==
The Virginia Department of Education, in conjunction with localities, sponsors regional academic-year Governor's Schools that serve gifted high school students during the academic year. Currently, 18 academic-year Governor's Schools provide students with acceleration and exploration in areas ranging from the arts, to government and international studies, to global economics and technology, and to mathematics, science, and technology.

They are established as “joint schools” by Virginia school law. As such, they are typically managed by a regional governing board of representatives from the school boards of each participating school division. The regional governing board is charged with developing policies for the school including the school's admissions process. While these processes differ from school to school, all applicants are assessed using multiple criteria by trained evaluators who have experience in gifted education and the focus area of the specific academic-year Governor's School.

Most schools specialize in a particular subject, and each serves a single region, only accepting students whose parents or guardians live within a predefined list of nearby cities or counties.

=== Full list of academic-year Governor's Schools ===
- A. Linwood Holton Governor's School Grades 10-12
- Appomattox Regional Governor's School for the Arts and Technology Grades 9-12
- Blue Ridge Virtual Governor's School Grades 9-12
- Central Virginia Governor's School for Science and Technology Grades 11-12
- Chesapeake Bay Governor's School for Marine and Environmental Science Grades 10-12
- Commonwealth Governor's School Grades 9-12
- Governor's School for the Arts Grades 9-12
- Jackson River Governor's School Grades 11-12
- Maggie L. Walker Governor's School for Government and International Studies Grades 9-12
- Massanutten Governor's School for Integrated Environmental Science and Technology Grades 11-12
- Mountain Vista Governor's School Grades 10-12
- New Horizons Governor's School for Science and Technology Grades 11-12
- Piedmont Governor's School for Mathematics, Science, and Technology Grades 11-12
- Roanoke Valley Governor's School for Science and Technology Grades 9-12
- Shenandoah Valley Governor's School Grades 11-12
- Southwest Virginia Governor's School for Science, Mathematics, and Technology Grades 11-12
- The Governor's School of Southside Virginia Grades 11-12
- The Governor's School @ Innovation Park Grade 11-12
- Thomas Jefferson High School for Science and Technology Grades 9-12

=== Thomas Jefferson High School for Science and Technology and Maggie L. Walker Governor's School for Government and International Studies ===
Though there are 19 Governor's Schools designated by the commonwealth for some amount of instruction during the academic year, many are intended only to supplement the education provided by local districts; these only offer a limited subset of classes, either on a partial-day basis, or in limited form to upperclassmen.

Three schools, Appomattox Regional Governor’s School, also known as "ARGS", the Thomas Jefferson High School for Science and Technology, also known as "TJHSST", (founded 1986) in Fairfax County, and Maggie L. Walker Governor's School for Government and International Studies, also known as "MLWGSGIS", (founded 1991) in Richmond, are full-fledged four-year university preparatory programs and two-year programs. Two are considered by many to be among the best public high schools in the country with both schools notably listed in Newsweek's Annual Public Elite list of high schools.

Admission to the two schools is highly sought-after and competitive. In the Northern Virginia region served by TJHSST, extensive courses were developed by private companies to help prepare students for the rigorous testing procedure. After public protests that this put poor and minority students at a disadvantage for acceptance, Fairfax County began offering similar free public courses.

As the acceptance rate is only about 15% at TJHSST, the school is currently looking to expand from 1600 students to 2000. The MLWGSGIS's acceptance rate is currently about 8% and enrolls about 700 students.

== Summer Residential Governor's Schools ==
Also offered are summer programs for exceptional Virginia students. These Governor's Schools last up to four weeks and are held at Virginia institutions of higher learning. Students reside on the campus, but take courses taught by teachers and professors from around the state. Depending on the program, students may or may not have choices in course selection. There is typically no relationship between the institution at which the Summer Governor's School is held and the program its other than providing the infrastructure support for what resembles a college lifestyle.

Selection is based on applications submitted by students during the school year, while they are attending their home high school. Often, the number of students accepted from any given high school is capped, depending on the population of the school. Selection to summer programs is limited to rising 11th and 12th graders.

=== Full list of Summer Residential Governor's Schools ===
The institutions at which the Summer Residential Governor's Schools are held can vary from year to year. The colleges indicated below are the most recent institutions selected for hosting the programs.

- Governor's Mentorship in Engineering, at Christopher Newport University overseen by College of William and Mary
- Governor's Mentorship in Marine Science, at Christopher Newport University overseen by College of William and Mary
- Governor's School for Agriculture, at Virginia Tech
- Governor's School for the Humanities, at Radford University
- Governor's School for Mathematics, Science, and Technology, at the University of Lynchburg
- Governor's School for Medicine and Health Sciences at Virginia Commonwealth University
- Governor's School for the Visual and Performing Arts, at Radford University

== See also ==
- Governor's Foreign Language Academies
- Governor's STEM Academies
