= Ziegfeld Theatre =

Ziegfeld Theatre could refer to:

- Ziegfeld Theatre (1927), a legitimate Broadway theater built on Sixth Ave. in New York City in 1927.
- Ziegfeld Theatre (1969), a single screen movie theater built on West 54th St. in New York City in 1969.
