= Claire Sullivan =

American fashion designer

Claire Sullivan is an American fashion designer. Sullivan launched her eponymous label, Miss Claire Sullivan, in 2021. Previously, she served as a co-creative director for the New York-label, Vaquera.

== Work ==
Miss Claire Sullivan's garments have been worn by celebrities and pop stars such as Addison Rae, Sarah Jessica Parker, Selena Gomez, Paloma Elsesser, Zsela, Kylie Jenner, Dua Lipa, Camila Cabello, Grace VanderWaal, and Lisa Rinna.

In 2023, the designer created a custom newspaper-print dress for Sarah Jessica Parker's digital Vogue cover and accompanying video. The dress was inspired by Sex and the City series's third season, episode 17, when Parker's character, Carrie Bradshaw, wears a similar newspaper-print dress from Dior’s John Galliano collection. The tussles are inspired by a Comme des Garçons coat the character wears in a different episode. The newsprint on Parker's dress originate from Vogue magazine covers and articles on the actress. For the Met Gala that year, Sullivan created a fit for Vogue's British fashion editor, Chioma Nnadi.

At the 2024 MTV Video Music Awards, Addison Rae wore a white satin bra and panty set lined with scalloped trim with tules and feathers, inspired by showgirls and the white swan from the ballet, Swan Lake. During Paris Fashion Week that year, the designer co-designed a series of looks alongside the Danish label Ganni. The looks included a Ditte Reffstrup: a stylish jersey dress paired with a voluminous skirt as well as a bomber jacket, blending chic, practical looks often seen on women in both Copenhagen and New York.
