= Bealeton, Virginia =

Unincorporated community in Virginia, US

- Census-designated place
- Location within Northern Virginia Location within Virginia Location within the United States
- Coordinates: 38°34′58″N 77°46′4″W
- Country: United States
- State: Virginia
- County: Fauquier

Area
  - Total: 5.49 sq mi (14.21 km^{2})
  - Land: 5.47 sq mi (14.18 km^{2})
  - Water: 0.012 sq mi (0.03 km^{2})
- Elevation: 324 ft (99 m)

Population (2020)
  - Total: 5,882
  - Density: 810/sq mi (312.8/km^{2})
- Time zone: UTC−5 (Eastern (EST))
  - Summer (DST): UTC−4 (EDT)
- ZIP code: 22712
- FIPS code: 51-05336
- GNIS feature ID: 1499100

Bealeton is a census-designated place (CDP) in Fauquier County, Virginia, United States, at the intersection of U.S. Route 17 and State Route 28. The population was 5,882 at the 2020 census.

Public schools in Bealeton include Grace Miller Elementary, Cedar Lee Middle, and Liberty High School. Bealeton is home to its own post office, with ZIP code 22712.

== Geography ==
Bealeton is located in southwestern Fauquier County. U.S. Route 17 leads north 10 miles (16 km) to Warrenton, the county seat, and southeast 27 miles (43 km) to Fredericksburg. VA 28 leads northeast 20 miles (32 km) to Manassas and southwest 2.5 miles (4.0 km) to U.S. Routes 15 and 29, which lead an additional 13 miles (21 km) to Culpeper.

According to the U.S. Census Bureau, the CDP has a total area of 5.5 square miles (14.2 km^{2}), of which 0.01 square miles (0.03 km^{2}), or 0.23%, is water. The area drains south via Marsh Run to the Rappahannock River.

== Demographics ==
Historical population
| Census | Pop. | Note | %± |
|---|---|---|---|
| 2010 | 4,435 | | — |
| 2020 | 5,882 | | 32.6% |
U.S. Decennial Census; 2010 2020

Bealeton was first listed as a census designated place in the 2010 U.S. census.

== History ==
Bealeton was originally a stop on the former Orange and Alexandria Railroad (absorbed ultimately into the Southern Railway in 1894, now Norfolk Southern), and the old railroad station building can be seen in the Bealeton Station development in front of the Bealeton Library building. The building was previously located on County Road 805, Bealeton Road, which runs parallel and near the railway. The area was a major traveling point during the Civil War and saw many skirmishes related to nearby engagements.

Despite the presence of Confederate troops during the early years of the war, Union troops succeeded in pushing the Confederate line south of the Rappahannock River and eventually into Fredericksburg. This move led to the control of the Orange and Alexandria Railroad, thus allowing the Union army to transport supplies deep into southern Virginia.

Bealeton lost importance with the decline of railroad travel and became a bedroom community of Warrenton and Northern Virginia primarily. This was aided by the comprehensive plan that made authorized water and sewer availability in 1967. Bealeton retains many large farms and provides a unique blend of agriculture, commercial, and residential development.

== Local attractions ==
Since 1970, Bealeton has been home to one of the last barnstorming air shows in America, simply called the "Flying Circus". Open every Sunday, May through October, activities include All-American barnstorming, wing walking, parachuting, aerobatic performances and open-cockpit biplane rides.

Bealeton is also the home of the world's largest old-fashioned roller skate. It was originally created as a float for a fireman's parade and put in place in front of the rink by Hugo Stribling when he opened Hugo's Skateway in 1978. The skating rink has changed hands several times since Hugo's was sold in 2007. The most recent owners closed the doors in January 2017 after their lease was terminated.

Morais Vineyards & Winery opened in 2011 and is Bealeton's only vineyard and winery, located right on Route 17. It is considered a Portuguese-style winery with a wedding venue that attracts thousands of people each year.

The Bealeton wedding venue Great Marsh Estate was featured in season 7 of Netflix's Love is Blind. The wedding venue opened in 2017 following the foreclosure of a private property built in 1989. It features an 8,000sqft Georgian-Revival building along with 121 acres of land.
