= George Fauquier =

English cricketer

Personal information
- Full name: George Lillie Wodehouse Fauquier
- Born: 30 November 1798; Hampton Court, Middlesex, England
- Died: 26 February 1887 (aged 88); West Haddow, Northamptonshire, England
- Role: Bowler

Domestic team information
- Years: Team
- 1819–1821: Cambridge University

Reverend George Lillie Wodehouse Fauquier (30 November 1798 – 26 February 1887) was an English cricketer who had a four-match career for Cambridge University between 1819 and 1821.

Born in Hampton Court to Thomas Fauquier and Charlotte Townshend, he was one of ten children, and attended Pembroke College, Cambridge. He scored the majority of his 29 career runs on 24 May 1819, against Cambridge Town Club, and managed to take four wickets in each of the next two seasons. He went on to become a vicar of West Haddon in Northamptonshire, authoring Readings and Addresses To Be Used With the Order for the Visitation of the Sick in 1869.

== Bibliography ==
- Arthur Haygarth, Scores & Biographies, Volume 1 (1744–1826), Lillywhite, 1862
