= N. Douglas Hunt =

Douglas Hunt was the Director of the Maggie L. Walker Governor's School for Government and International Studies in Richmond, Virginia from 2002 to the Spring of 2009.

== Biography ==
After receiving his B.S. from the University of Richmond, which he attended on an athletic scholarship for Basketball, and a Masters in Education Administration, Mr. Hunt began a 34-year career as a teacher and administrator with Henrico County Public Schools. He served 11 years as principal at Hermitage High School and 6 years as principal at Highland Springs High School. During his career he coached basketball, track and cross-country, and was Chair of the Virginia High School League two years. After leaving Hermitage, Mr. Hunt worked as Henrico’s Director of Technical and Continuing Education before his retirement in 2000. In 2002, Hunt came out of retirement and took the position of Director of the Maggie L. Walker Governor's School in Richmond, VA. In 2009, Hunt announced that the 2008-2009 school year would be his final year as the Director of the Governor's School. He retired in the Spring of 2009 at the conclusion of the school year.
