= Jim Holdren =

American track and field coach (born 1942)

James G. Holdren, Jr.
- Born: May 4, 1942 (age 84)
- Occupations: Athletic Coach, Teacher
- Spouse: Barbara Holdren
- Awards: 1988 NHSCA Girls Track Coach of the Year, 2006 NHSCA Girls Cross Country Coach of the Year, Virginia High School Hall of Fame, NHSCA Hall of Fame

James G. Holdren, Jr. (born 1942) has been coaching cross-country and track and field for 60 years. He began his coaching career at William and Mary while he was still a cross-country runner on the team.

In 1988, Holdren won the NHSCA girls track coach of the year award, and he won the NHSCA girls cross-country coach of the year award in 2006. A coach can only win this award once in any particular sport, making it both more honorable and exceptionable that he has won the award both in track and in cross-country. He is the only Virginia coach to win the national coach of the year award in two sports. Holdren has compiled 1,227 wins in high school running, including an 80 percent winning percentage in dual meets with a 16-year undefeated streak in girls outdoor track. He has coached 10 national record holders, 56 All-Americans, 115 state champions, and two female sub-five minute mile runners.

Holdren also serves as the track and field rules interpreter for the state of Virginia.

Holdren was inducted into the Virginia High School Hall of Fame in 1993, and he was inducted into the National High School Coaches Association Hall of Fame on June 28, 2006, in Branson, Mo. Holdren was one of only two coaches in the Richmond area to receive the honor, joining Hopewell basketball coach Bill Littlepage, who was inducted in 1997.

Currently, Holdren is the head coach of cross country, indoor track, and outdoor track at the Maggie L. Walker Governor's School for Government and International Studies.

During the 2013–2014 school year, Holdren coached the Maggie Walker boys' and girls' teams to VHSL State championships in cross country. The teams inserted 13 of their 14 runners into the all state team. Under his guidance, the boys' team also went on to win the VHSL State Indoor and Outdoor Track titles, while the girls' team won the Indoor title and were runners-up in the Outdoor competition.

The Maggie Walker teams once again flourished in the 2014-2015 year under Coach Holdren. Both the boys' and girls' teams won the VHSL 2A State title in cross country, indoor track, and outdoor track, becoming the first school in VHSL to achieve the "Triple Crown" for both teams in one year. His teams credit their success to Holdren's training.

As of the 2019–2020 school year, Holdren is still coaching at Maggie L Walker with a Girls Varsity team ranked #12 in the state.

In 2022, Holdren entered his 61st year of cross country running coaching.
