= Lisa Smokstad =

American tire specialist (born 1969)

- Born: Lisa Jones Smokstad; 6 September 1969 (age 56); Shakopee, Minnesota
- Education: University of Minnesota
- Occupation: Tire specialist
- Years active: 1996–present
- Spouse: Craig Smokstad (m. 1993)

Lisa Jones Smokstad (born September 6, 1969) is an American tire specialist. She has been employed by multiple-champion NASCAR race car team Hendrick Motorsports since 1999, and has worked for various drivers.

== Biography ==
=== Early life ===
Smokstad was born on September 6, 1969, in Shakopee, Minnesota. She is the daughter of Ellis and Pat Jones. Smokstad began participating in gymnastics and competed in the sport until her early teenage years. She worked as a child advocate in Minnesota's courtrooms. While enrolled at the University of Minnesota on a psychology course, Smokstad found work doing concessions at Raceway Park in 1990 which she did during the weekends. The job was secured by one of her friends with whom she attended gymnastic class with. Smokstad said in 2006 that she had not originally intended for an auto racing career: "When I went to college I didn't think I'd be dirty four days a week." It was where she met her husband Craig, whom she married in 1993. She obtained the job as she was the only member of her family who could understand tire fractions. In 1992, Smokstad graduated from the University of Minnesota with a bachelor's degree in psychology.

=== Career ===
In 1996, Smokstad began working as a tire person for her brother-in-law, who was competing in American Speed Association-sanctioned races. She later overheard that race car driver Ken Schrader was planning to start a new short-track team and required a tire specialist. Smokstad and her husband accepted the position and moved to Charlotte, North Carolina, in 1996. When the two race teams merged in 1999, she was required to look for a new job because Schrader wanted a tire specialist with more experience. He advised her not to send a résumé to Hendrick Motorsports because of her gender. However, she was asked by Jack Sprague and his crew chief Dennis Conner to join Hendrick Motorsports as their tire specialist. She began in the position in 1999. That same year, he won the Craftsman Truck Series; the experience strengthened Smokstad's loyalty to the team and garnered her admiration for its founder Rick Hendrick.

She later worked with various drivers who raced for Hendrick Motorsports. Smokstad coached a gymnastics team while not working in auto racing. She gave birth to her daughter, RaElla, on August 30, 2007. She and fellow crew member Zach Miller were awarded the Cup Series "Consistently Smooth" Tire Specialist Award in 2009. Smokstad was promoted by Hendrick Motorsports in 2010 to focus on strategizing and tire testing.
