= Ziegfeld's =

Coordinates: 38°52′03″N 77°00′38″W

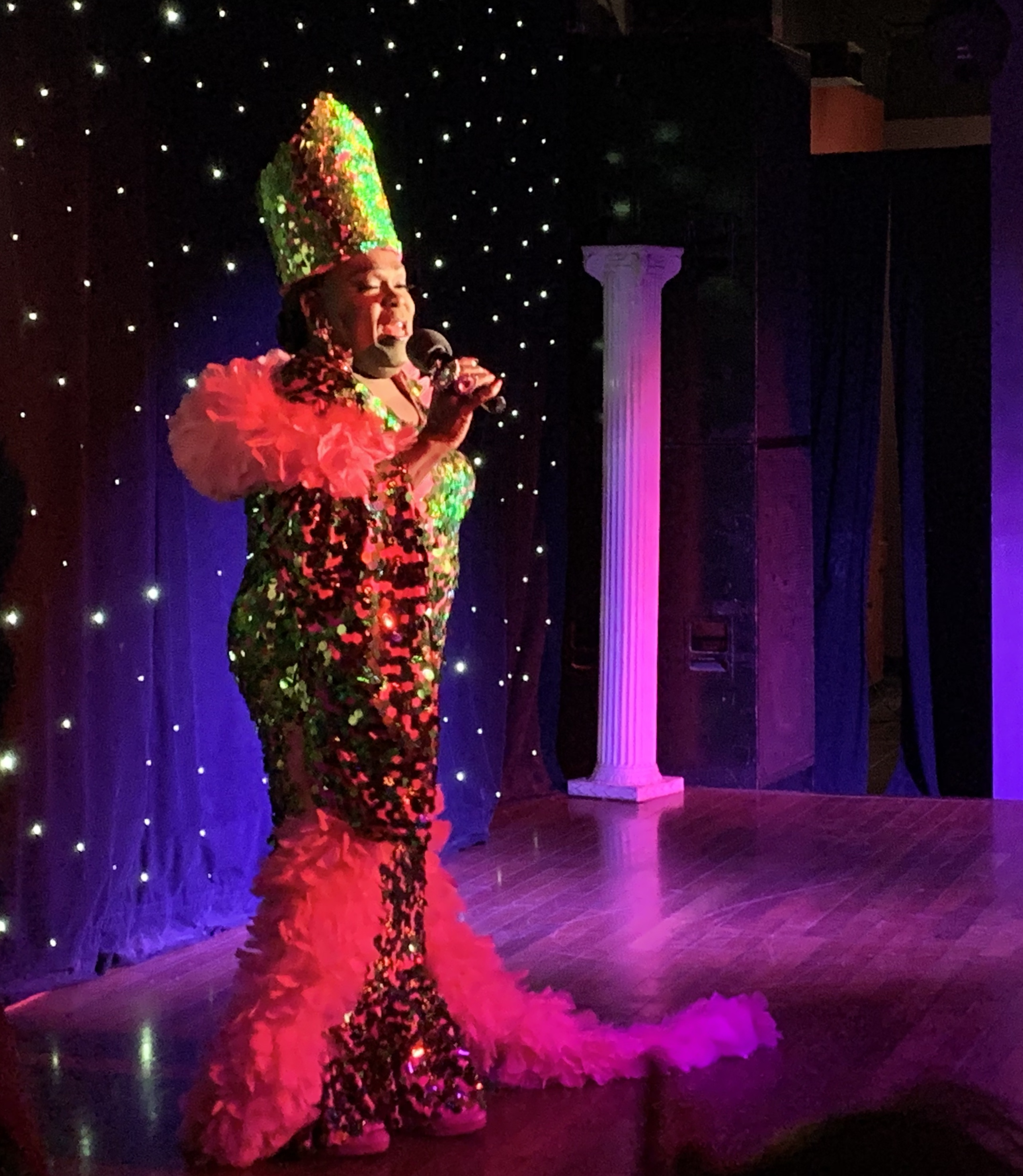
Drag queen Ella Fitzgerald performing at Ziegfeld's in 2019

Ziegfeld's/Secrets was a dual-themed nightclub in Washington, D.C., with Ziegfeld's featuring drag queens, and Secrets featuring male strippers. The entertainment venue first opened in 1980, was forced to close in 2006, then reopened in a new location in 2009. The second location was closed permanently in 2020.

== History ==
Originally located at 1345 Half Street SE, the circular venue was divided by a wall with a shared bar in the middle and connecting doors.

The Ziegfeld's side of the venue featured a large stage adorned on either side by a giant silver high-heeled shoe. Each weekend the "Ladies of Illusion" show was hosted by the venue's staple drag queen Ella Fitzgerald, with two performances on Fridays and Saturdays, and one on Sundays. The shows lasted approximately an hour and featured five drag queens doing various performances for packed crowds.

On the Secrets side of the venue, there were fully nude male dancers (catering to a mostly gay male crowd). It was one of the few venues in the United States where male strippers danced fully nude.

In 2006 the property was seized by the District of Columbia via eminent domain and torn down, along with many other gay-oriented businesses, to make way for the new Nationals Park baseball stadium.

The closing of the bar, compounded with the loss of several nearby LGBTQ businesses, was met with outrage and disappointment. Many were concerned whether the bar could find a new location. Under District law, businesses with a liquor license that permitted nude dancing could only relocate within their current zoning district or in a central business district. The new location would also have restrictions on proximity to residences, churches, and schools.

== Relocation ==
Ziegfeld's/Secrets reopened at 1824 Half St., SW, Washington, D.C., a few blocks southwest of its former location. The transfer of its liquor license to the new location was approved, and the club set a "grand opening" date of February 13, 2009. The nondescript building was all black with a neon pink "Z/S" above the door. The new venue maintained the theme of twin bars, now divided by two levels: drag performances on the first floor, with all-nude male dancers upstairs. Leading lady Ella Fitzgerald continued her tenure at Ziegfeld's.

== Closure ==
While shuttered during the coronavirus pandemic in 2020, Ziegfeld's announced the venue had been sold, and the business would not reopen.

A reunion event was held in 2025, including drag performances by Ella Fitzgerald and Destiny B. Childs.

== See also ==
- List of LGBTQ bars
- List of strip clubs
