= Fauquier High School =

Location
- 705 Waterloo Road; Warrenton, Virginia 20186; United States; 38°43′12″N 77°48′52″W

Information
- School type: Public high school
- Founded: 1963
- School district: Fauquier County Public Schools
- NCES District ID: 510132000607
- Superintendent: Major R. Warner Jr.
- Principal: Nick Brousse
- Grades: 9–12
- Enrollment: 1,156 (2024-25)
- Language: English
- Campus: Suburban
- Colors: Red, Grey, White
- Athletics conference: Conference 22 4A
- Mascot: Falcons
- Rivals: Liberty High School; Kettle Run High School
- Website: Official Site

Fauquier High School is a public high school in Warrenton, Virginia, United States. The school is part of Fauquier County Public Schools and is located at 705 Waterloo Road. Its mascot is the falcon.

== History ==
Fauquier opened in 1963 and is the oldest high school in Fauquier County. The county was primarily a rural area, but has experienced a high rate of growth since the 1990s, which led to Liberty High School's opening in 1994, and Kettle Run High School's opening in the fall of 2008.

In 2015, the school's student-run newspaper, The Falconer, was prohibited by the school administration from publishing an article about student drug use. The article eventually was published in the local publication Fauquier Now with a substantially wider audience.

In 2023, principal Kraig Kelican died from injuries he sustained in a vehicular accident while driving to school. The school's football field was renamed to Kelican Field in his honor.

== Academics ==
Laurel Ridge Community College offers a dual enrollment program where students can earn college credit while in high school. The school's scholastic bowl team competes annually on It's Academic.
