= Mountain Vista Governor's School =

Mountain Vista Governor's School for Science, Math & Technology
- Mountain Vista Governor's School Logo

Location
- 6480 College Street; Warrenton, Virginia 20187; United States; 38.682084°N 77.783407°W (Warrenton Campus); 39.036086°N 78.265314°W (Middletown Campus)

Information
- School type: Magnet governor's school
- Established: 2006
- Director: Ladona Gorham
- Grades: 10th-12th
- Years offered: 3
- Enrollment: 211 (as of 2022-23)
- Colors: Navy and Gray
- Feeder schools: Warrenton Campus: Culpeper County; Fauquier County; Rappahannock County; Middletown Campus: Clarke County; Frederick County; Warren County; City of Winchester
- Information: 540-347-6237
- Website: http://www.mvgshome.org/

Mountain Vista Governor's School for Science, Math & Technology (commonly Mountain Vista or MVGS) is one of Virginia's 19 state-initiated governor's schools, serving primarily 10th, 11th, and 12th graders. The school is composed of two campuses, one each in Middletown, Virginia, United States and Warrenton, Virginia, United States. Admission is determined via an application process.

== History ==
Planning for Mountain Vista began in 2003; its participating counties were one of the last in the state not covered by an existing academic-year governor's school or similar program. The participating school systems surveyed parents and students within their respective counties to gauge interest. A plan for implementation was created and put into motion; A committee was formed, and approval was sought from the Virginia Department of Education. A first review of the plan was presented to the Virginia Department of Education at their January 11, 2006 meeting. The funding for MVGS (a total of $190,544) was first approved in the 2006-2008 Biennial Budget passed by the Virginia House of Delegates.

On January 11, the estimated portion of the school budget that the participating counties had to pay was approximately $216,527; it was divided among each of the counties. Each county's school board was responsible for approving both the funding and a 3-year commitment in order for the project to continue. Each jurisdiction was made responsible for the funding for each slot at the governor's school allocated to them.

In May 2006, Dr. Rosanne Williamson was named director of Mountain Vista, and she assumed the post on July 1.

== Admission ==
Each participating county has a local committee that decides who attends from that county. Students interested must complete an application and submit transcripts and two written essays. The applications along with teacher recommendations are reviewed by the local committee and admission decisions are made.

=== Participating localities ===
The number of slots at the governor's school allocated to each jurisdiction, as of September 14, 2006:

- Clarke (6)
- Culpeper (26)
- Fauquier (60)
- Frederick (49)
- Rappahannock (6)
- Winchester (10)
- Warren (24)

== Facilities ==
The Mountain Vista Governor's School program does not have a classroom facility of its own. Instead, students travel to Laurel Ridge Community College to take courses offered by the program, then the students return to their home schools and maintain eligibility for sports and extracurricular activities there. The area served by Mountain Vista is too large for a single location to which busing all students would be practical; Laurel Ridge was chosen because it has a campus on each end of the area covered by Mountain Vista. The two sites are connected via videoconferencing that allow them to interact with each other.

In addition, all Mountain Vista students are given laptops by their respective county for use year round. During the 2022-23 school year, the school used Google Classroom to allow the students to submit and retrieve notes and assignments and to provide virtual office hours for instructors.

== Academics ==
The Mountain Vista curriculum was designed to be a college level mathematics and science program providing a solid basis for doing research and making connections between disciplines. Mountain Vista includes humanities courses. All classes are connected in a way that when a topic is being taught in physics, a similar concept is being taught in math and humanities is discussing social applications and ramifications of the subject. Mountain Vista offers summer enrichment activities for all new and returning students along with a full orientation program for new parents/guardians and students. Most MVGS classes are eligible for dual enrollment, giving the students the ability to earn college credits while still in high school.

The courses offered are:

- Science:
  - MVGS Physics 1C
  - MVGS Physics 2C
  - MVGS Chemistry
  - MVGS Biology 1
  - MVGS Biology 2
- Mathematics:
  - MVGS Math Analysis/Pre-Calculus
  - MVGS Calculus 1
  - MVGS Calculus 2/3
  - MVGS Statistics
- Humanities:
  - MVGS Humanities 10/English 10
  - MVGS Humanities 11/English 11
  - MVGS Humanities 12/US Government
- Research:
  - MVGS Research 1: Scientific Research
  - MVGS Research 2: Humanities Research
- Electives:
  - MVGS Economics
  - MVGS Psychology
  - MVGS Computer Science 1
  - MVGS Computer Science 2

Along with in class work, classes include projects that allow for hands on problem solving and collaboration with other students.

== See also ==
- Governor's Schools (Virginia)
- Magnet School
