= Carlotta Nobile =

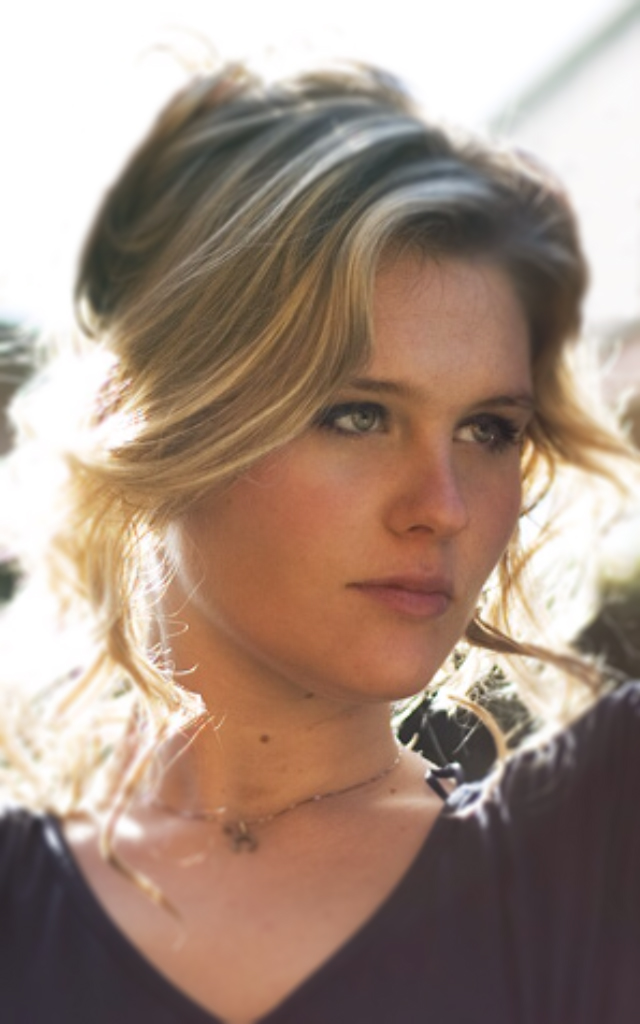
- Carlotta Nobile photographed by Manuela Morgia in 2009.

Background information
- Born: 20 December 1988; Rome, Italy
- Died: 16 July 2013 (aged 24) Benevento, Italy
- Genre: Classical Music
- Occupations: violinist, art historian and writer
- Instrument: Violin
- Years active: 2005–2013
- Website: www.carlottanobile.it

Carlotta Nobile (Rome, 20 December 1988 – Benevento, 16 July 2013) was an Italian art historian, violinist, writer, blogger, and artistic director of Santa Sophia Academy chamber orchestra in Benevento from September 2010 up to her death. A multi-faceted artist and scholar, among the most popular young Italian violinists of her time, she was also known for her testimony of courage in her fight against cancer and for the deep experience of Faith gained in the last months of her life, which ended aged 24. In February 2018 she was included among the "Young Witnesses" of the Synod of Bishops 2018 on the theme "Young people, faith and vocational discernment", announced by Pope Francis. She is a probable candidate for canonization.

== Career ==
Born into an ancient family, she graduated in violin at the Conservatory of Benevento when she was only 17, attaining First Class Honours with Distinction, under the guide of her mentor Massimo Bacci. After that, in her short but intense career, she took many specialist courses in violin like the one with Pierre Amoyal at the Mozarteum University of Salzburg, with Pavel Vernikov at the International Academy of Portogruaro and at the Fiesole School of Music, and with Eugen Sârbu at London.

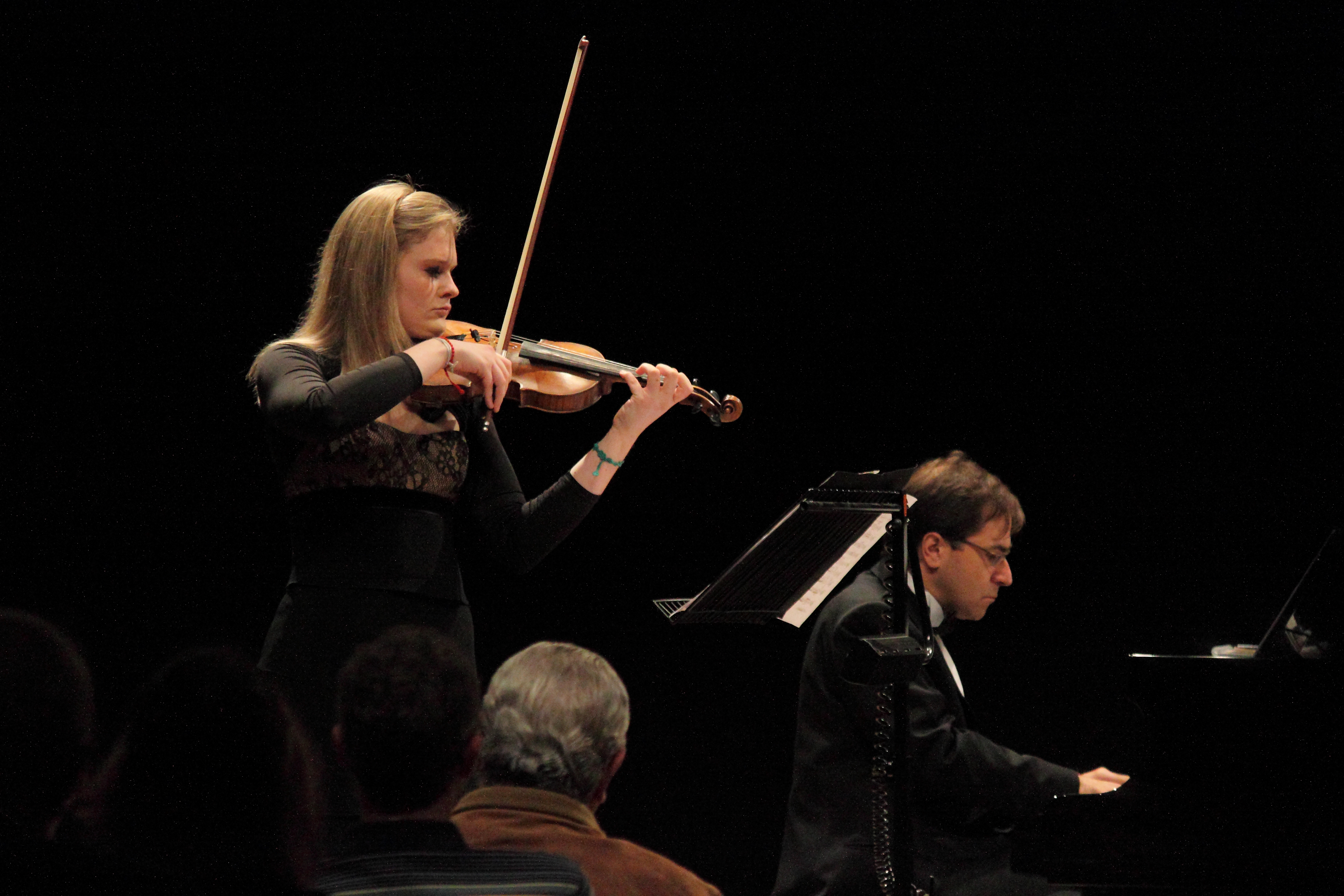
Carlotta Nobile playing in duo with the pianist Marco Scolastra in support of the Italian Multiple Sclerosis Association (AISM), at the St. Domenico Auditorium in Foligno on 7 October 2012. Photo by Francesco Fratta.

Absolute winner of many national competitions, including the First Absolute Prize at the "F. Kreisler" National Violin Competition of Matera (2006) and at the "Città di Viterbo" National Competition (2008), and the First Prize at the Riviera della Versilia National Competition (2005), she took the award of "Distinguished Musician" at the International Ibla Grand Prize 2007 and "Ernest Bloch Special Mention" at the International Ibla Grand Prize 2008.

Marcello Abbado said about her: «an exceptional musician, a sweet and sensitive girl with an extraordinary vocation for music». Martin Berkofsky, with whom Nobile played in duo, will declare: "Our concert was the greatest and most wonderful musical experience I had in seventy years of life."

She combined music with her passion for arts, taking a bachelor's degree cum laude in Art History Studies at Sapienza University of Rome in 2010 and attending the University of Cambridge (Art History International Summer Courses in 2009), the Contemporary Art Course at Sotheby's Institute of Art of New York (in 2010) and taking the LUISS Master of Art 2011/2012 in Rome.

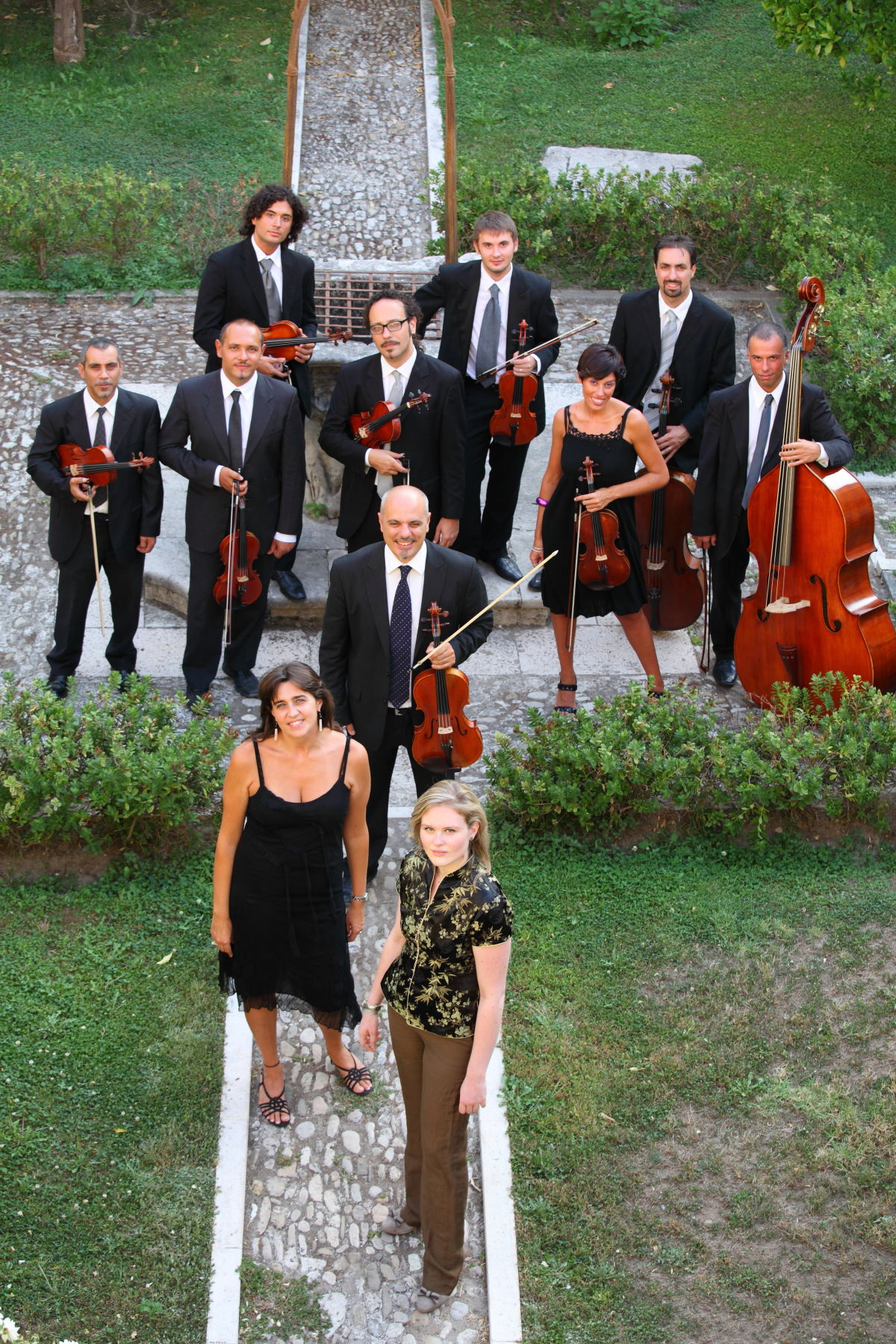
Santa Sophia Academy chamber orchestra in Benevento during the artistic direction by Carlotta Nobile (the first from the bottom).

In December 2008, she released her first book "Il silenzio delle parole nascoste" ("the silence of hidden words"), followed by "Oxymoron", published by Aracne Editrice in 2012. For several years she wrote a music column called "Righe Sonore" on the website Quaderno.it and wrote for the magazine "Realtà Sannita".

At only 21, in 2010, she became the artistic director of Santa Sophia Academy Chamber Orchestra in Benevento. As first Artistic Director, she is committed to the Academy launch, also for the purpose of exporting it outside its region, taking care of the three-year concert program, new formula on the whole national territory. Her proposal for a varied and eclectic program, ranging from Mozart to The Beatles, from Piazzolla to Strauss, from Bach to the Italian Twentieth century and the Neapolitan Eighteenth century, collects acclaim and public success. Nobile will remain active as Artistic Director of Santa Sophia until the untimely death. Her work helped to lay the foundations for the rapid entry of the academy into the Fund for the Performing Arts (FUS) of the Italian Ministry of Cultural Heritage. After her death, the Academy will live three years of stop. It then resumed its activities under the artistic direction of Maestro Filippo Zigante.

During her career, she explored the interconnections among music, contemporary art and writing, using interdisciplinarity and contamination criteria.

In Rome, together with some other young scholars, she founded the group "Almost Curators", with the aim of connecting contemporary art experts with general public. As a member of the "Almost Curators" group, she managed cultural events and wrote many articles on the group's blog.

== Cancer and the blog ==
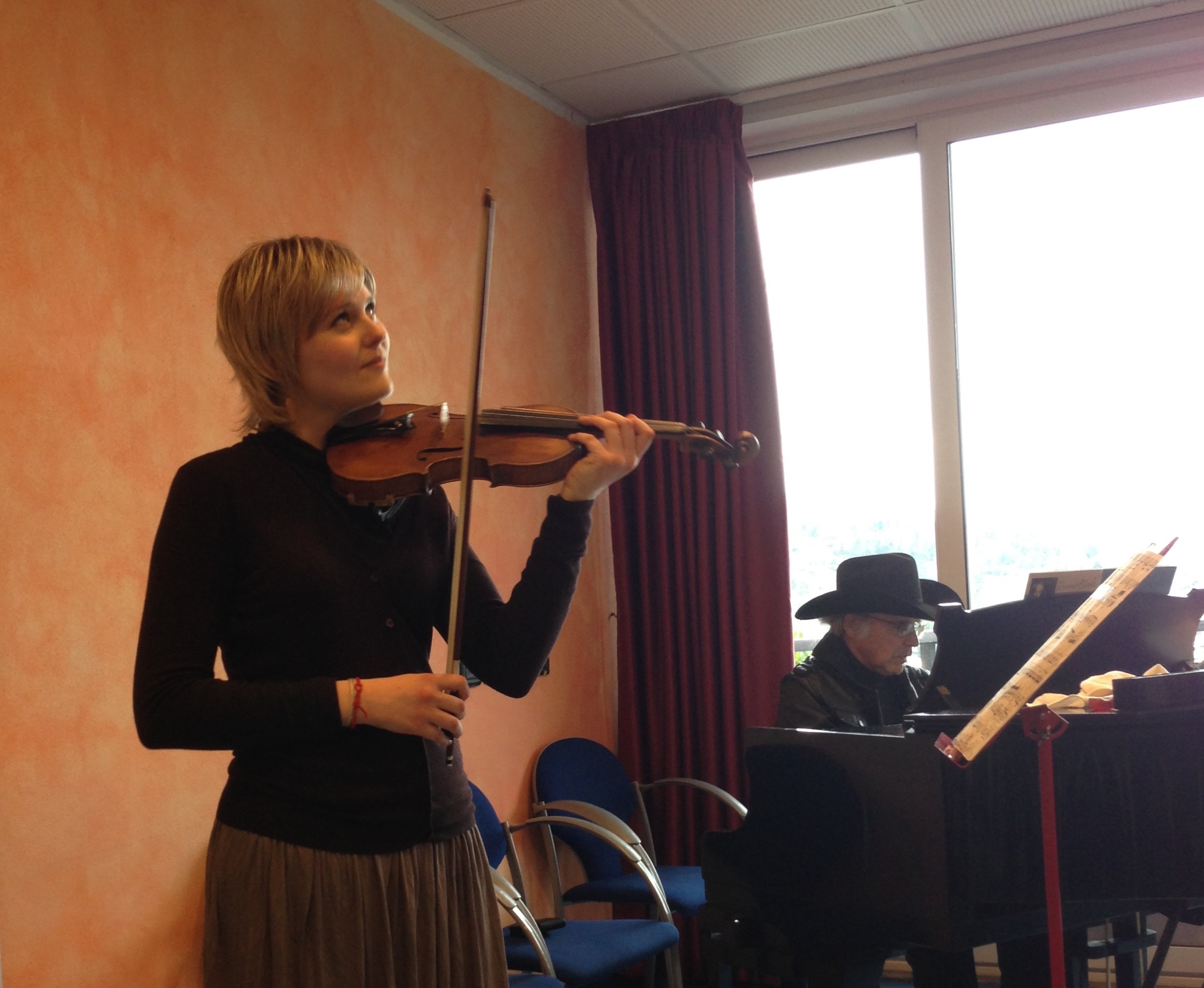
Carlotta Nobile and American pianist Martin Berkofsky, as volunteers of Donors of Music, play for the patients of the oncology department of Carrara Hospital on 9 April 2013. The violinist would die three months later, followed by Berkofsky, who was also ill, in December.

In October 2011, when she was 22, Nobile was diagnosed with melanoma; she fronted every possible cure and various surgical interventions while keeping on her musical and artistic career, alternating concerts and hospitals recoveries. On the newspaper La Stampa, Sandro Cappelletto said: “The more the treatment was hard and the diagnosis got worse, the more her music became a form of rebellion to her destiny, her real life, never losing a bit of quality”.

In April 2012, she started, under a concealed identity, her Facebook page "Il Cancro E Poi" ("Cancer and Afterwards") that gave birth to a huge community of people suffering from cancer just like her. They identified themselves with her thoughts, finding a vital help in her words. In August she created the related website.

I don't even know how many centimeters of surgery scars have been drawn on my body, but I love them all, one by one. Every single centimeter of etched skin which will never be healed!
Those are the starting points of my wings.

— Carlotta Nobile, Il Cancro E Poi_

Because you want to prove first of all to yourself that you can even suffer from IV stadium metastatic melanoma but LIVE. Live all joys, projects, sorrows, tears that life gives you every single day.
Because there's an Afterwards you'll never stop fighting for. Because nobody can keep you away from the certainty that – despite all the scars, surgeries, needles in veins, tests, contrast liquids, therapies and sorrows – there's a unique happiness waiting for you, there's your greatest dream which keeps looking at you from the future and can't wait to reach you. Because you know that all you're living now will be given back to you.
Because you clearly feel that the way you now have to look at life could have been reached just through this sorrow.

— Carlotta Nobile, Il Cancro E Poi_, August 5, 2012

During the period of her illness, playing in a duo with the pianist Martin Berkofsky, she joined "Donatori di Musica" ("donors of music"), a social community involved in bringing music concerts in the Italian cancer wards. About her social and charity commitment there's the book "Donatori di musica" by L. Fumagalli, Curci Editions (2015).

== Faith, the pope, and death ==
=== Faith ===
In the last months of her life, Carlotta lived a deep faith experience, born suddenly on 4 March 2013 at her awakening from a crisis that brought her to the Hospital of Milan for a few days. This fact, perceived like a revelation, was anonymously told by Carlotta on her blog dedicated to cancer in the last post before her death:

I'm healed in my soul. In an instant, in an ordinary day, as I awoke from a crisis.
I opened my eyes and I found I was a new person. And that's a miracle.

— Carlotta Nobile, Il Cancro E Poi_, April 5, 2013

She continued in the same post:

And in a moment you understand that the cancer can HEAL YOUR SOUL, restore the balance in your life essence and give you Faith, hope, self abandon, consciousness of finally becoming who you really wanted to be in all your life but never were: a PEACEFUL WOMAN. So you understand that it’s the cancer that leads you to finally love yourself wholeheartedly, in your strengths and weaknesses, it leads you to savour each moment, each smell, each flavour, each perception, each word, each sharing, every little fragment of infinity condensed in a very common and very precious moment. You understand that it’s cancer with its torment and aggressiveness, with its brutality, to bring you the LIGHT in the end.

— Carlotta Nobile, Il Cancro E Poi_, April 5, 2013

=== Letter to Pope Francis ===
Her spirituality was considerably inspired by Pope Francis's sermon calling young people to bear the cross with joy (24 March 2013 Homily).

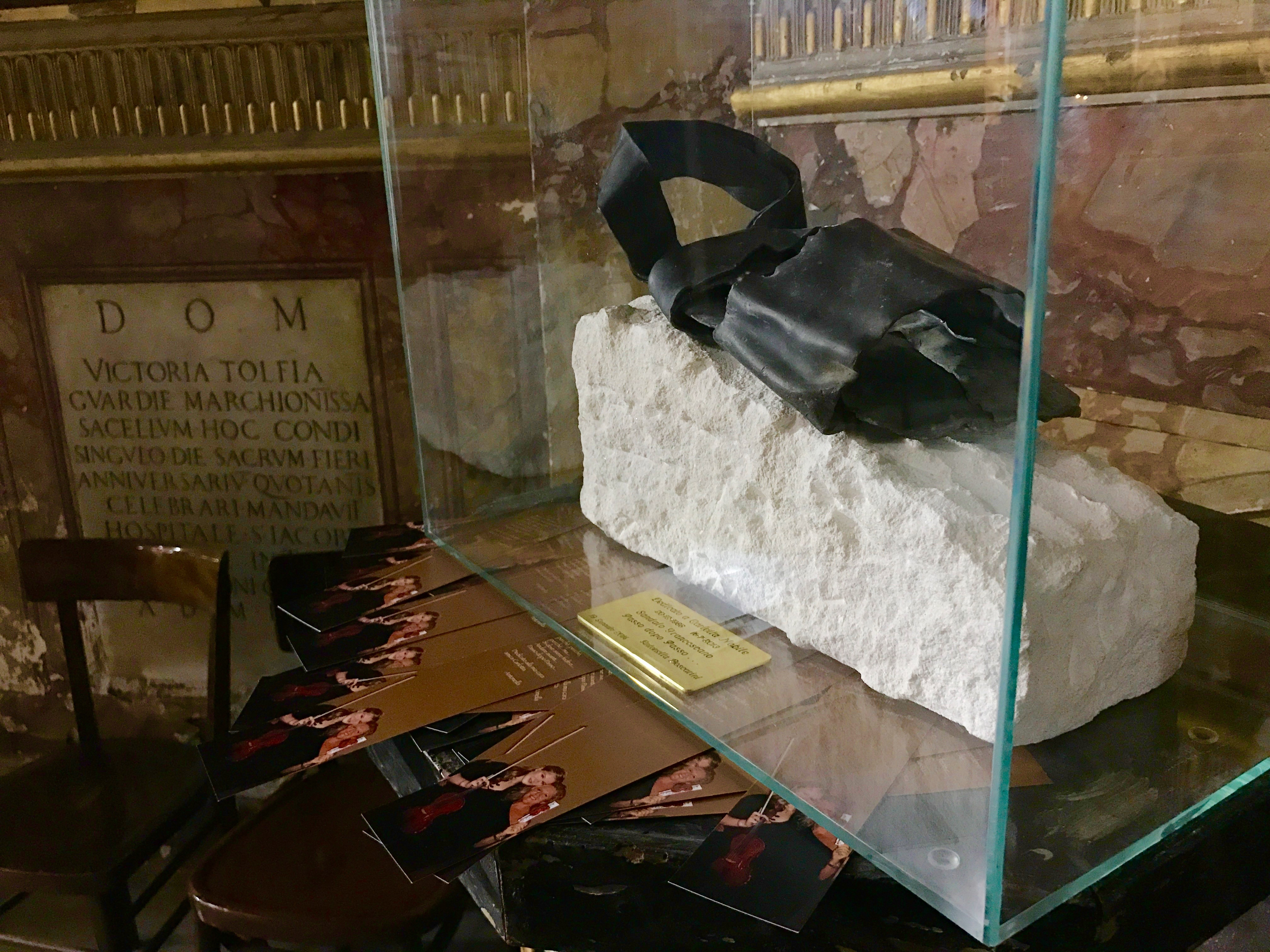
The sculpture "Step by Step" by Antonella Boscarini, dedicated to Carlotta Nobile and donated by the artist to San Giacomo in Augusta Church, in Via del Corso (Rome), in January 2014. Made in the form of a Franciscan sandal, it is located in the Chapel of the Sacred Heart.

On Good Friday 2013, in the centre of Rome, Nobile was looking for a church because she wanted to confess, but usually they are closed during the lunch break. The only one left open was the San Giacomo in Augusta church, in Via del Corso. There Nobile met the parish priest don Giuseppe Trappolini, they had a very touching conversation and, as Don Giuseppe said, she "cried from joy" as she talked about her story, her battle against melanoma and the tranquility she felt after listening to the words of Pope Francis. The priest was moved by a remarkable coincidence: just the day before he was received with some other Roman priests by the Pope and in that occasion the Holy Father asked them to keep the churches open on Good Friday all day long to allow anybody to confess. Trappolini decided to tell the pope the story of Nobile in a letter and on April 10 morning, the pope rang up back to tell he would pray for her, adding: "This girl gives me courage". Just in the moments of the phone call, Nobile was seized by a cerebral crisis in the Hospital of Carrara, where she had gone as a volunteer musician of the "Music Donors". On waking up in the ward, on the morning of 11 April 2013, after having recovered lucidity, still in bed and in the company of his mother, she reported that she was having a trinitarian vision consisting of a luminous triangle on the chamber wall.

Nobile wrote the pope a letter to communicate her faith in life and in this divine encounter.

That letter reads in part:

Dear Pope Francis,
You have changed my life.
I am honored and blessed to be able to carry the Cross with Joy at the age of 24. I know that cancer has healed my soul, by loosening all my interior knots and giving me Faith, Trust, Surrender, and an immense Serenity right at the time when my illness was most severe.
I trust in the Lord, and on my difficult and troubled path, I always see His help.
Dear Pope Francis, You have changed my life.
I would like to ask You something… I have an immense desire to meet You, even for only a moment. To pray together with You the "Our Father"!
"Give us this day our daily bread" and "Deliver us from evil" Amen.
I entrust this dream of mine to Don Giuseppe and I trust in God!
Pray for me, Holy Father. I pray for You every day.
Carlotta.

— Carlotta Nobile, Letter to Pope Francis, April 12, 2013

=== The last three months ===
Thanks to Don Trappolini, Nobile was about to meet personally the pope, but in May 2013 her condition started to get worse and so she went back to Benevento, and she spent the last months of her life in her family house. In those months she dedicated herself to prayers in a mood of total trust, self-abandon, and gratitude with God. On the last night of her life, that between 14 and 15 July 2013, Nobiles father reportedly was awakened by the following words of Nobile, whispered repeatedly in a serene tone and with gaze turned towards the ceiling:

Lord, I thank you. Lord, I thank you. Lord, I thank you.

— quoted in F. Rizzo, P. Scarafoni, In un attimo l'infinito. Carlotta Nobile, Paoline, Milan, 2017, p. 191

The next day, a few hours before her death, she gave her loved ones the last farewell:

My three wonderful men: Dad, Fanfy and Matteo. My sweet mom. What could I want more?! I am lucky.

— quoted in F. Rizzo, P. Scarafoni, In un attimo l'infinito. Carlotta Nobile, Paoline, Milan, 2017, p. 192

After two years of struggle, she died at the age of 24. The death of the Violin Angel – as the media and the web called her – was announced on the most renowned newspapers and national TV channels.

=== Testimony of faith ===
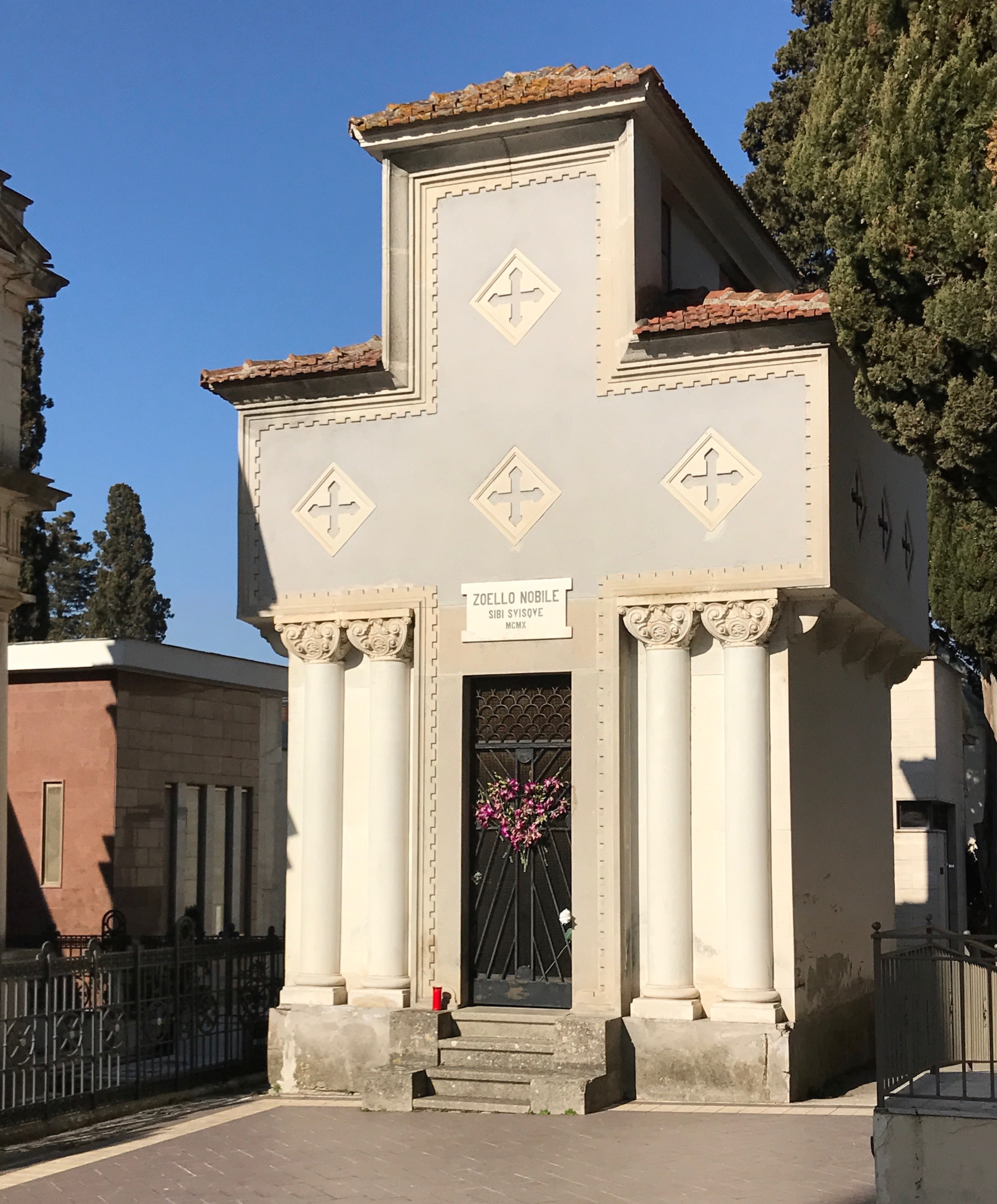
The family chapel where Carlotta Nobile rests, in the Municipal Cemetery of Benevento.

Her funerals were held in the morning of 17 July 2013 in the Basilica church of San Bartolomeo, so full to not contain all the people coming. After having read some fragments and personal messages through which Carlotta announced calmly the "healing" of her soul, the Rector of the Church Mgr Mario De Santis preached in his homily: «Young people, move, walk and find yourselves! She found the Faith. Today it’s not a sad day, on the contrary the bells will ring in a festive way because even if we cry for having lost a person, on the other side this event offers us the meaning of Resurrection».

A few months later, on Carlotta's birthday, she will be publicly remembered by the Archbishop of Benevento Andrea Mugione as "an extraordinary example of Faith and love ending with sacrifice".

Her story of Faith, told for the first time and translated in different languages in 2016 by the catholic information site Aleteia, has spread on the web, on television and on the Catholic press in Italy, United States, France, Slovenia, Croatia, Spain, Mexico, Portugal, Brazil, India and Vietnam.

==== The Synod of Youth and the voice of the bishops ====
In February 2018 she was included among the "young witnesses" of the Synod of Bishops 2018 on the theme "Young people, faith and vocational discernment", called by Pope Francis. Various Bishops and theologians have publicly expressed themselves on her figure.

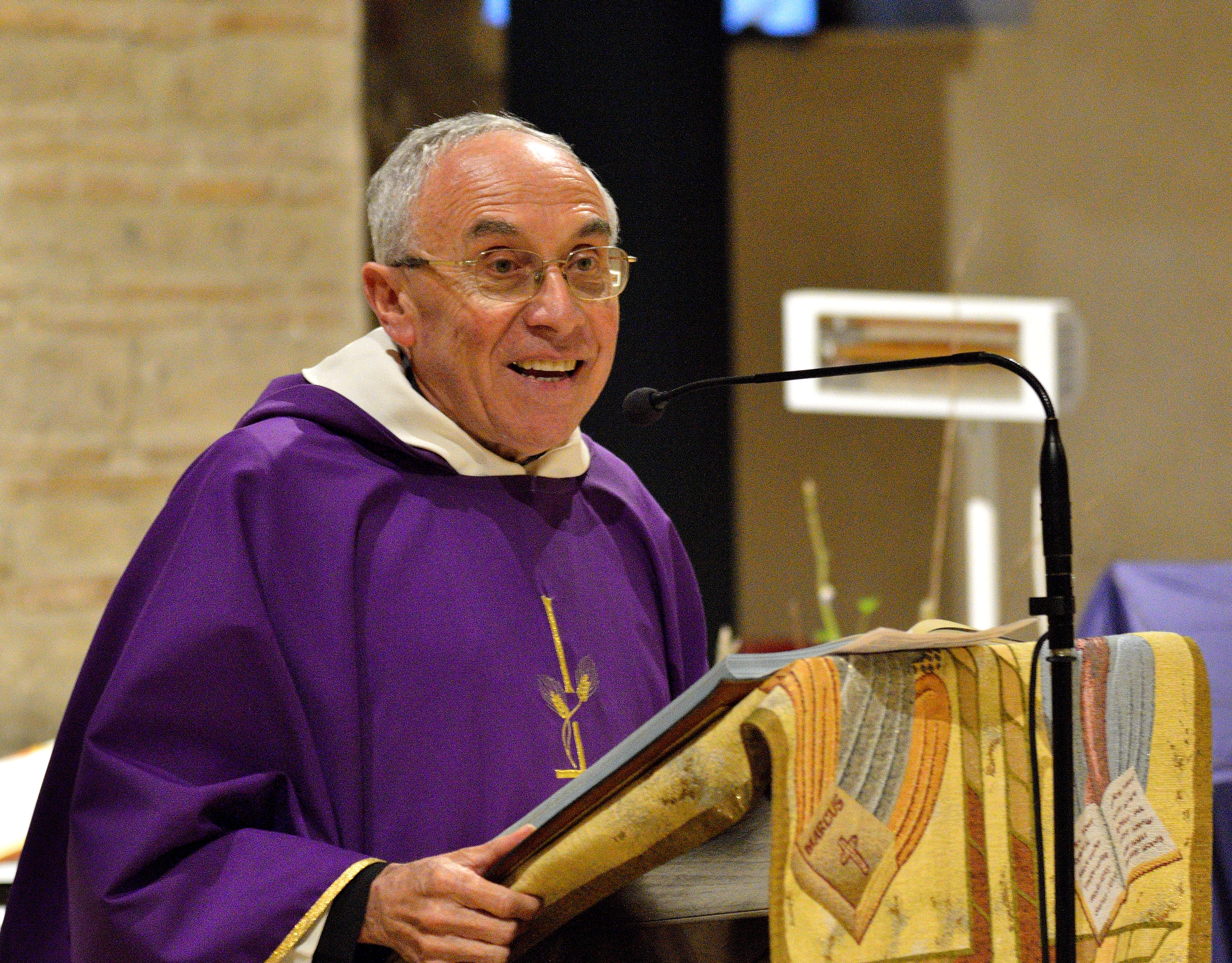
Father François-Marie Léthel, OCD, during Holy Mass in suffrage of Carlotta Nobile, celebrated on 26 March 2017 at the Church of Santa Sofia in Benevento.

The theologian Father François-Marie Léthel O.C.D., one of the leading experts in the theology of saints, Consultor of the Congregation of the Causes of Saints and Preacher of the spiritual exercises to the Holy Father Benedict XVI and to the Roman Curia in 2011, wrote about her: "Yes, Jesus was really "the greatest love" of Carlotta in the sufferings of the last months. (...) Together with her, we too thank Jesus for the gift of his infinite love and we learn to joyfully carry the cross. With her witness on earth and now with her intercession in heaven, Carlotta will help us to walk towards holiness."

Thus Msgr. Andrea Mugione, Archbishop Emeritus of Benevento: "Jesus returns to the Father, but the ascending Jesus carries with him the gift of his wounds, of his wounds. (...) And He tells us that this is the price of forgiveness that He gives us. The price that Carlotta also paid by joining Christ. With prayer, joining the wounds of Jesus, she brought with him - it is true - she brought her wounds with her as a gift to the Father. (...) This is why I say that with Carlotta, with the last few months of her life, where she lived strong moments of faith and surrender to the Lord ... with Carlotta we can carry forward what is the evangelization of Suffering, to help us re-read the experience of Suffering in the light of the mystery of Love and pain of Christ, who saved us not from the Cross but in the Cross. (...) In the Cross, she, Carlotta, certainly understood what the Faith is worth - and lived it deeply - how much Love is worth, how much the Joy of living is worth - and she had so much of Joy of life -. For this we can really call her ... in her suffering she has become a Witness of the Faith."

The Archbishop of Taranto Msgr. Filippo Santoro said of her: "A life so full of intensity, of various interests, music, song, culture, literature ... (...) but her success is accomplished in that day of the experience of March 4, 2013 in which there is the perception that life is realized when one gives, life is realized when it is opened to others, it opens up to the mystery of love (...). And therefore we stammer before these testimonies, which show us that the Cross and the Resurrection go together, that the Cross is the path to follow. (...) At a time when at the end, the last words - "Lord, I thank you. Lord, I thank you. Lord, I thank you."- they open wide on an extraordinary hope. This is a thing of holiness. It could not be explained without the presence of Christ. "

Msgr. Francesco Zerrillo, Bishop Emeritus of Lucera-Troia, expressed himself in this way, commenting on the last months of the life of Carlotta: "The last was the time of ascents. (...) I saw the sacredness of life. I saw the gift of life. (...) Thus Carlotta's life has become a life-gift, a life offered to God. She was truly a prodigy. (...) I would like to stimulate everyone to a deeper knowledge of this girl, who was really brave. She was a seed of hope that offers a positive message, offers help to those who are discouraged in life and offers everyone the vision of a "beyond". (...) That "beyond" of Carlotta is a vision that is no longer earthly, but is heavenly, no longer human, but divine. "

Archbishop Michele Seccia, Archbishop of Lecce, recounts this: "A person who leaves us a special witness in life. Her memory so alive to you today becomes a watermark, a litmus paper through which the Word of God we have heard becomes even more understandable. (...) She has sown in his life so well in taking care of cancer patients, of terminal people. (...) The Gospel is current! If today our friend Nobile reminds us that a sudden listening to an inner light, a dream, a word of the Gospel, a rediscovered certainty is enough, the safe way of death is the way of Life! A logical absurdity, but it is the way of Salvation, of Hope. (...) And we really want to thank God for giving us the opportunity to reflect on this in the light of a concrete experience. "

So instead, Msgr. Gennaro Pascarella, Bishop of Pozzuoli: "And I am certain that this evening Carlotta is with us. When we say the Creed we say "I believe the communion of saints", that is, I believe that among us the Church here on this Earth and our brothers who have preceded us there is this communion, this exchange also of prayers. I am sure that she also played her part this evening from Heaven. Y She has truly experienced an ordeal, she has experienced human frailty to the full, which takes the body and consumes it. She tells us «even in our frailties Jesus is there. He is present». Indeed, while I listened to you I felt strongly once again that even in what is the greatest fragility, death, even there God came down, Jesus is there and gives us hope. Here, I now want to invite you to say that prayer so dear to Carlotta, the Our Father, which must be the prayer of every disciple of Jesus. "

== Recognitions ==
In September 2013, she posthumously received the ANLAI Prize, and the Arechi II Prize from the Province of Benevento in June 2014.

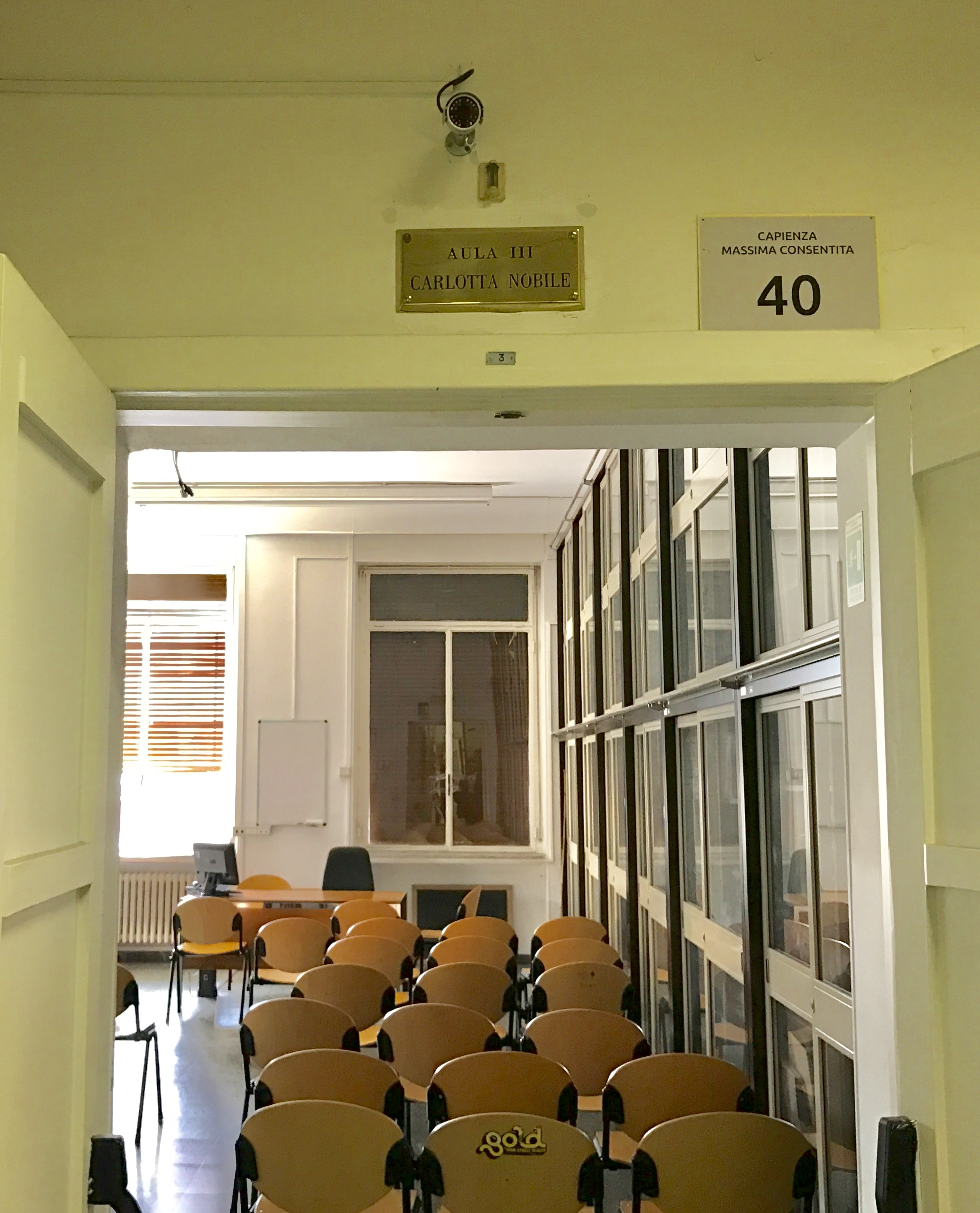
The "Carlotta Nobile" Classroom in the Department of History of Art and Performing Arts of Sapienza University of Rome.

The Sapienza University of Rome awarded her a posthumous MA degree in Art History Studies and, with solemnity, on 22 November 2014, dedicated to her memory the hall Aula Tre of the History of Art and Performance Arts Department "for her fine studies on the relationships among Art, Music and Writings".

Thanks to the will of Donatori di Musica group, the music hall of the cancer ward of San Maurizio Hospital in Bolzano has borne her name from 6 August 2014.

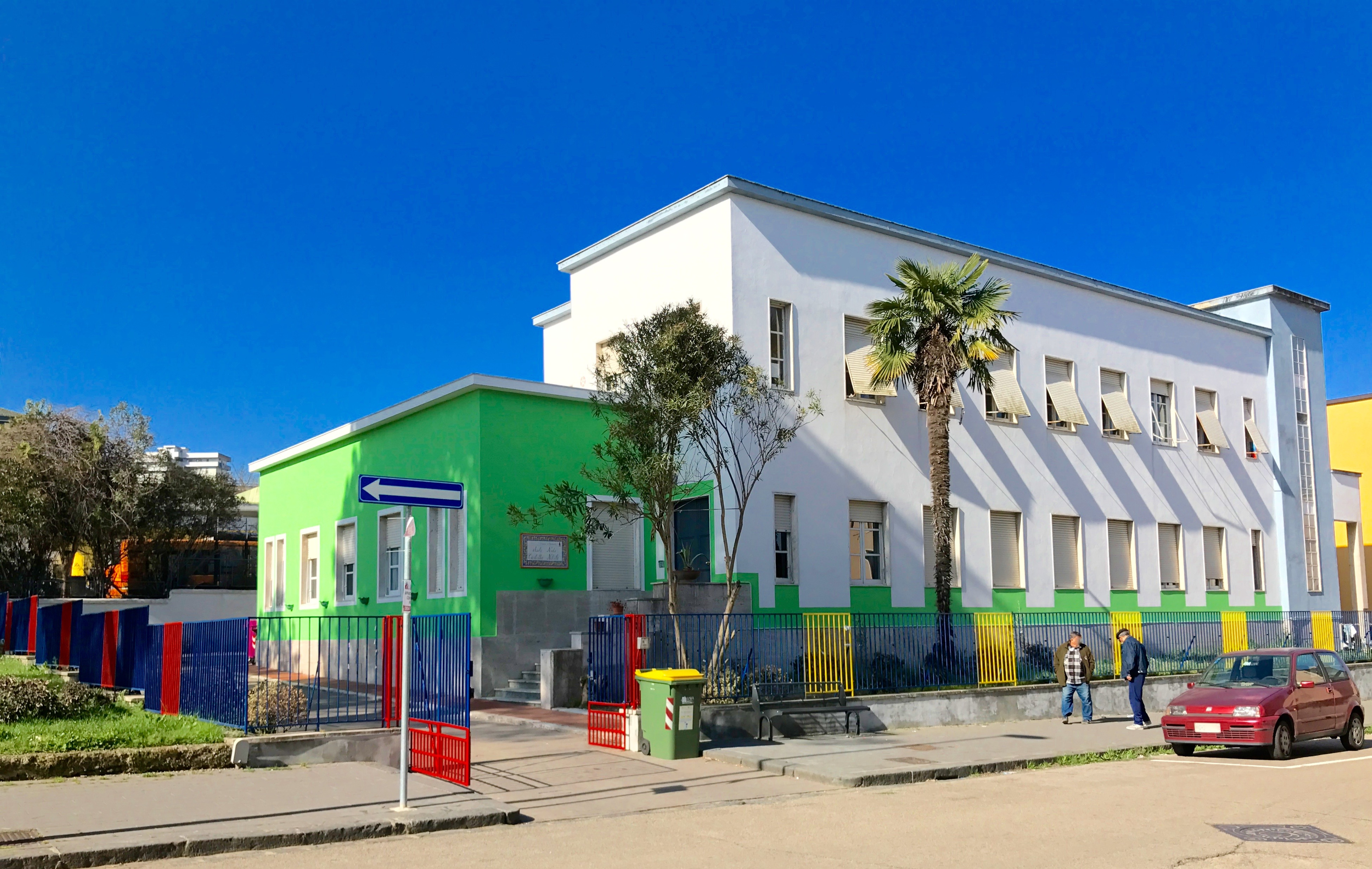
The "Carlotta Nobile" Municipal Nursery School, in Benevento. It is located in Via Firenze.

On 20 September 2016 the Benevento city Council disclosed that the nursery school in via Firenze has been named after Carlotta Nobile, because of her "extraordinary example of Faith, love and life". With the participation of the highest authorities of the city, the ceremony of entitlement was held on 20 December 2016, on Carlotta's birthday. In that occasion the mayor Clemente Mastella said: «The entitlement of the nursery school to Carlotta Nobile is for all of us a very important event. Carlotta is a positive example of the spirit of resilience Pope Francis always talks about: in fact she fronted the adversities with a deep strength and courage. Her example is to be followed by the entire community».

On 4 March 2017, during the inauguration of the academic year, the "Nicola Sala" State Conservatory of Music of Benevento names a Classroom of the institute after Carlotta Nobile, in the presence of the Minister of Education, Universities and Research of the Italian Republic Valeria Fedeli and of the highest civil, military and religious authorities of the city.

On 31 October 2013 American pianist Martin Berkofsky (with whom Carlotta shared the dedication to Donatori di Musica) in one of his last performances before his death, wanted to commemorate Carlotta with a concert held in Milan at the Società del Giardino, playing the religious piano compositions written by Franz Liszt.
