= Berkofsky =

Berkofsky is a surname. Notable people with the surname include:

- Ava Berkofsky, American cinematographer
- Martin Berkofsky (1943–2013), American classical pianist
