= Weston (Casanova, Virginia) =

Historic house in Virginia, United States

- U.S. National Register of Historic Places
- Virginia Landmarks Register
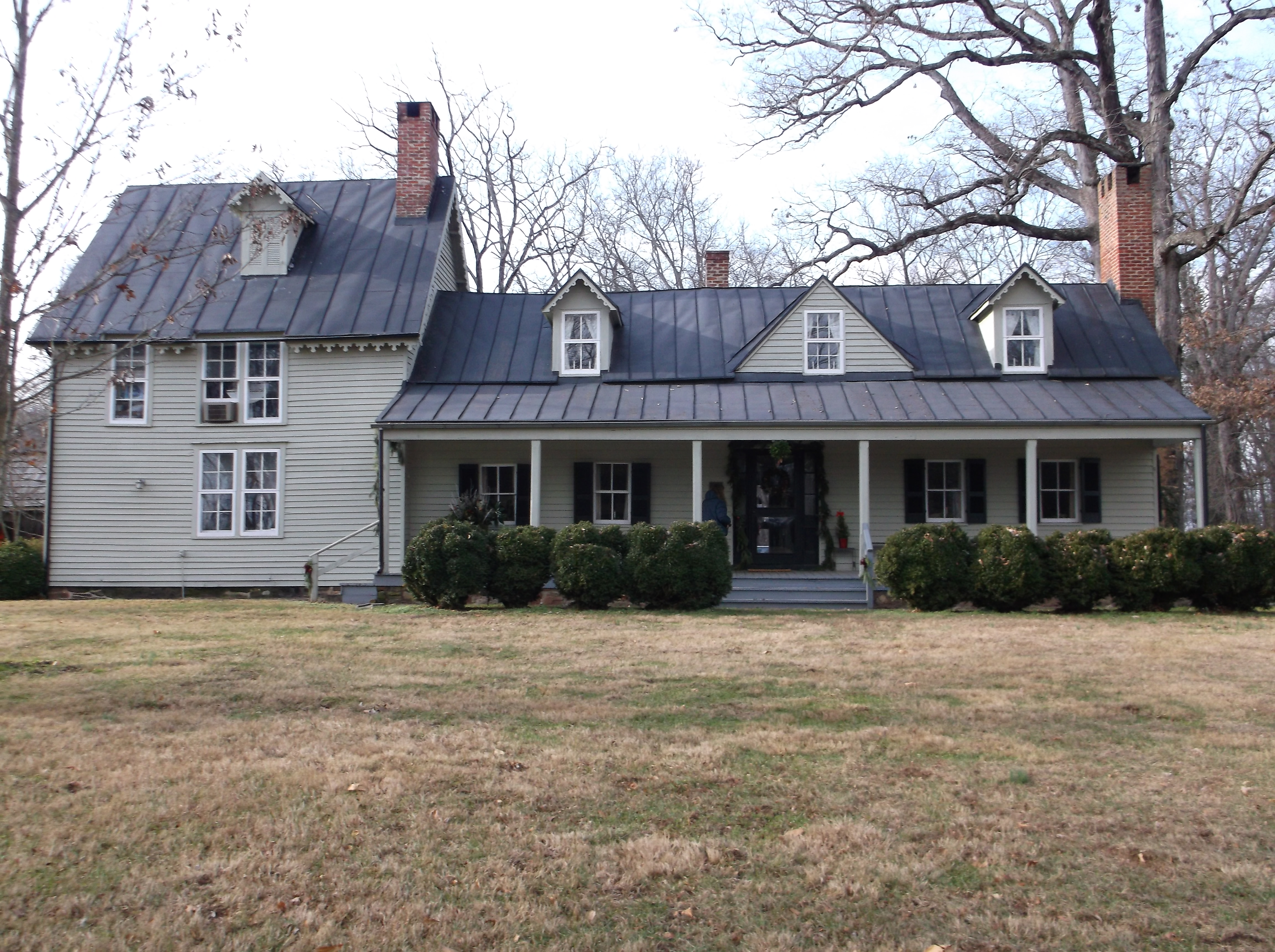
- Weston Farmstead mainhouse, March 2013

- Location within Northern Virginia Location within Virginia Location within the United States
- Location: 4477 Weston Rd., near Casanova, Virginia
- Coordinates: 38°39′47″N 77°41′55″W
- Area: 10 acres (4.0 ha)
- Built: c. 1810, 1860, 1870, 1893
- Architectural style: Gothic Revival
- NRHP reference No.: 96001447
- VLR No.: 030-0058

Significant dates
- Added to NRHP: December 6, 1996
- Designated VLR: September 18, 1996

Weston is a historic home and farm located near Casanova, Fauquier County, Virginia. The original section of the house was built about 1810, with additions made in 1860, 1870, and 1893. The original section was a simple, 1 1/2-story, log house. A 1 1/2-story frame and weatherboard addition was built in 1860, and a 1 1/2-story frame and weatherboard rear ell was added in 1870. In 1893, a two-story frame and weatherboard addition was built, making the house L-shaped. This section features a steeply pitched gable roof with gable dormers and decoratively sawn bargeboards and eaves trim—common characteristics of the Carpenter Gothic style. Also on the property are a number of contributing 19th century outbuildings including the kitchen / wash house, smokehouse, spring house, tool house, blacksmith shop, stable, and barn. Weston is open as a house and farm museum.

It was listed on the National Register of Historic Places in 1996.

== Gallery ==
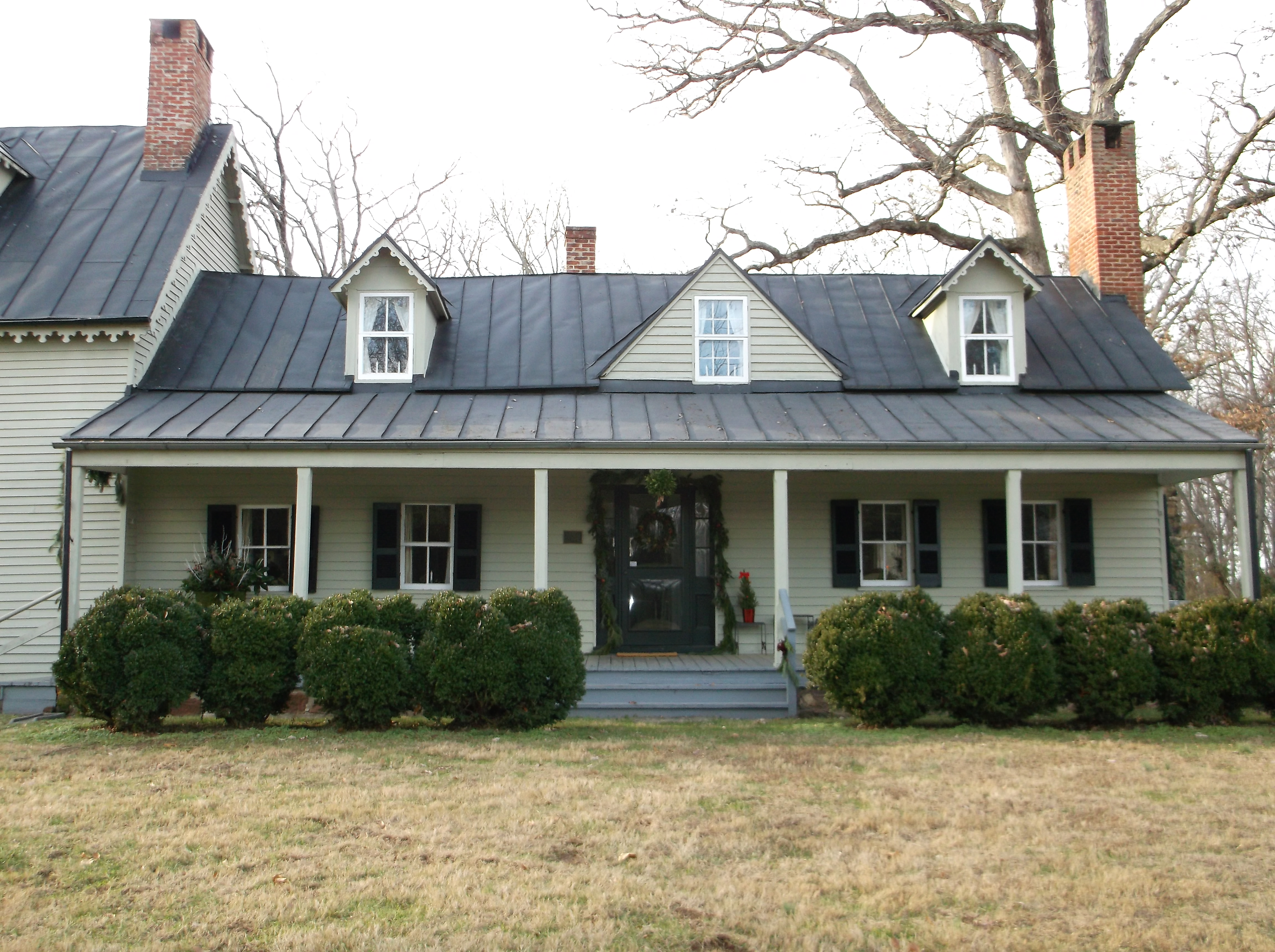
Main House

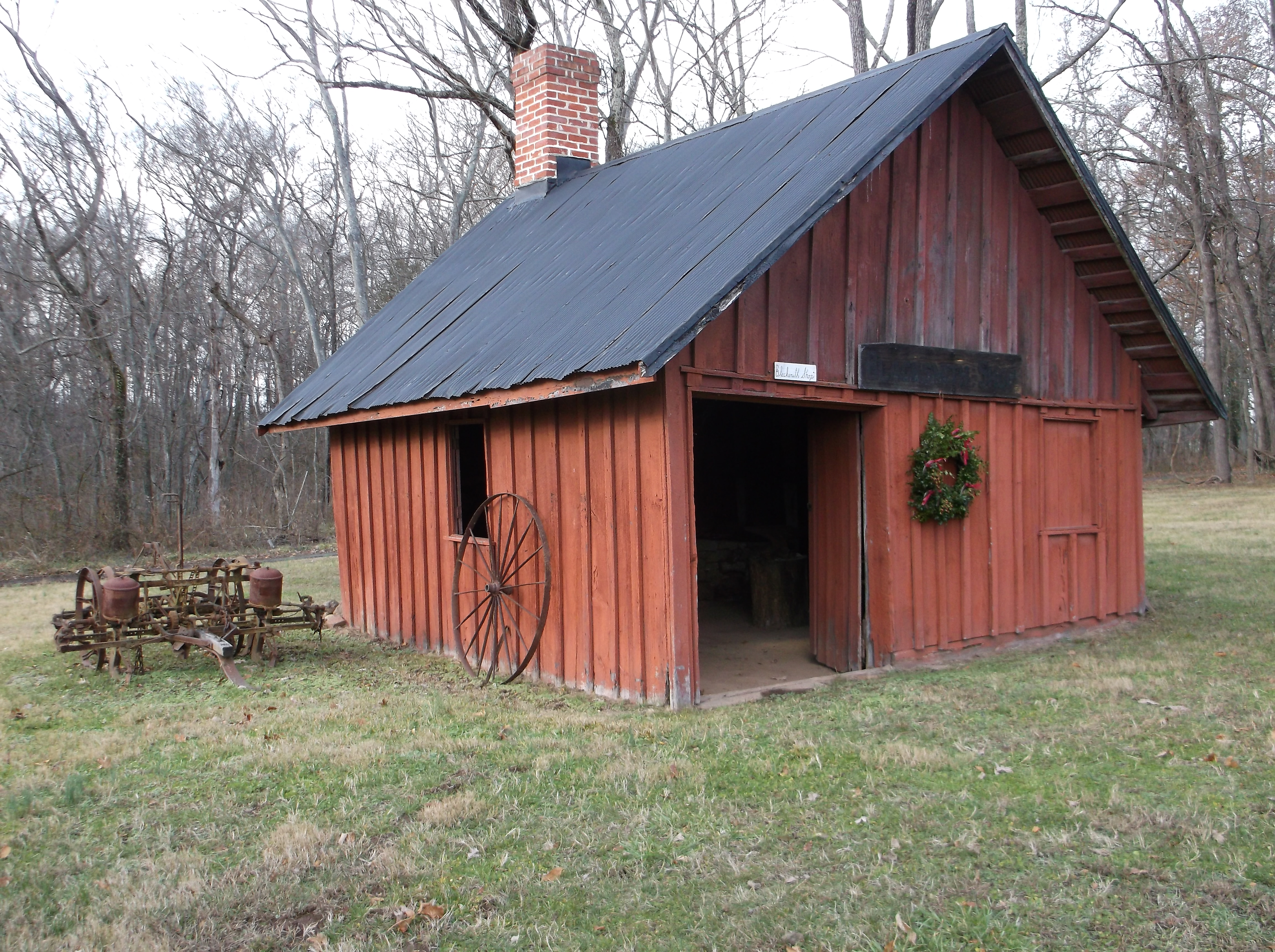
Blacksmith shop

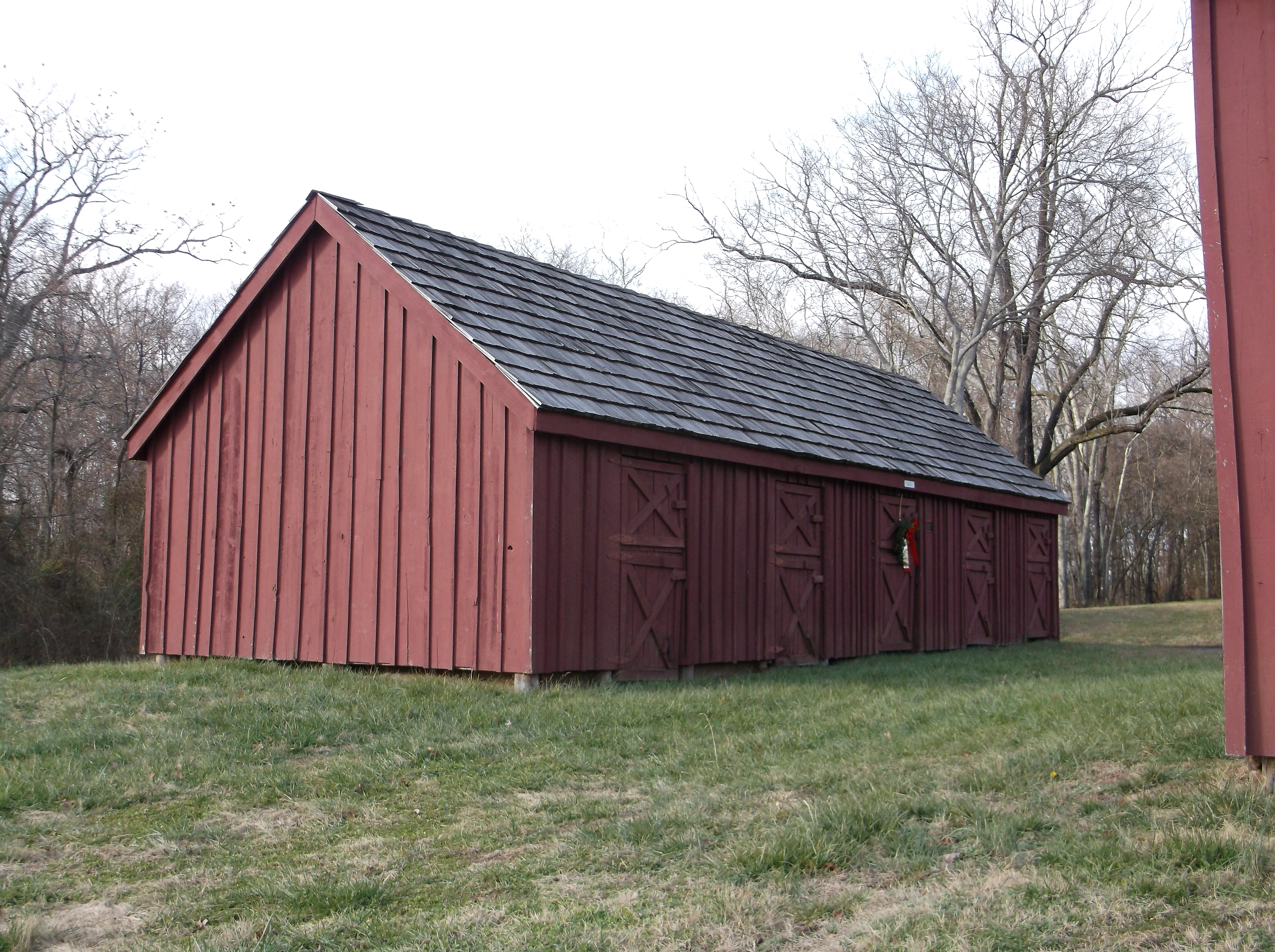
Stable
