= Casanova Historic District =

Historic district in Virginia, United States

- U.S. National Register of Historic Places
- U.S. Historic district
- Virginia Landmarks Register
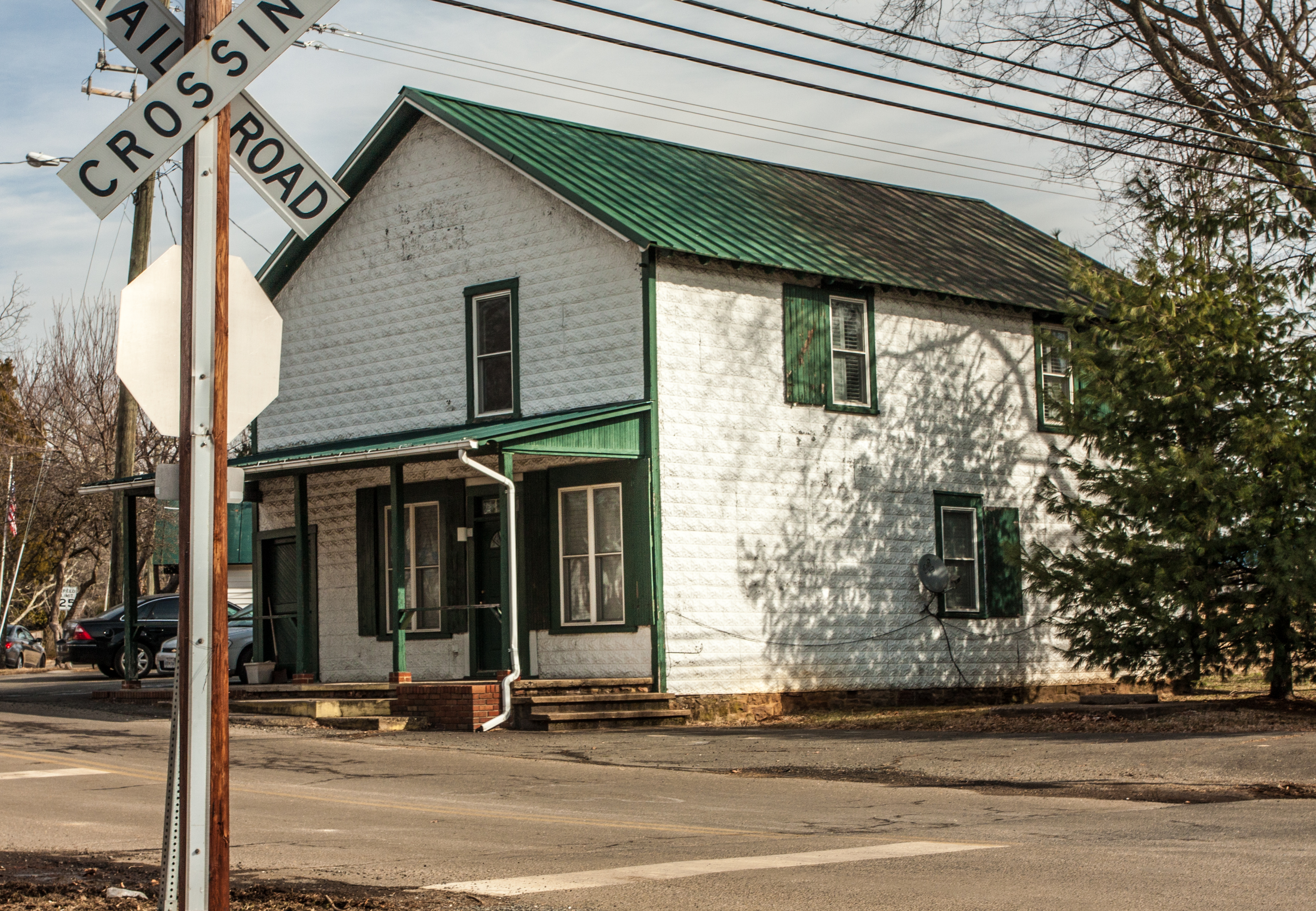
- Casanova Historic District, February 2014

- Location within Northern Virginia Location within Virginia Location within the United States
- Location: Area inc. parts of Casanova Rd., Rogues Rd. and Weston Rd., Casanova, Virginia
- Coordinates: 38°29′28″N 77°43′03″W
- Area: 32 acres (13 ha)
- Architectural style: Gothic Revival, et al
- NRHP reference No.: 05001264
- VLR No.: 030-5163

Significant dates
- Added to NRHP: November 16, 2005
- Designated VLR: September 14, 2005

Casanova Historic District is a national historic district located at Casanova, Fauquier County, Virginia. It encompasses 32 contributing buildings in the rural crossroads of Casanova. They include a variety of late-19th and early-20th century dwellings, the former Casanova Store, a two-story stone mill converted to a dwelling, the Gothic Revival style Grace Church Parish Hall, a former school, and a former garage converted to a post office in the 1950s.

It was listed on the National Register of Historic Places in 2005.
