= Melrose (Casanova, Virginia) =

Historic house in Virginia, United States

- U.S. National Register of Historic Places
- Virginia Landmarks Register
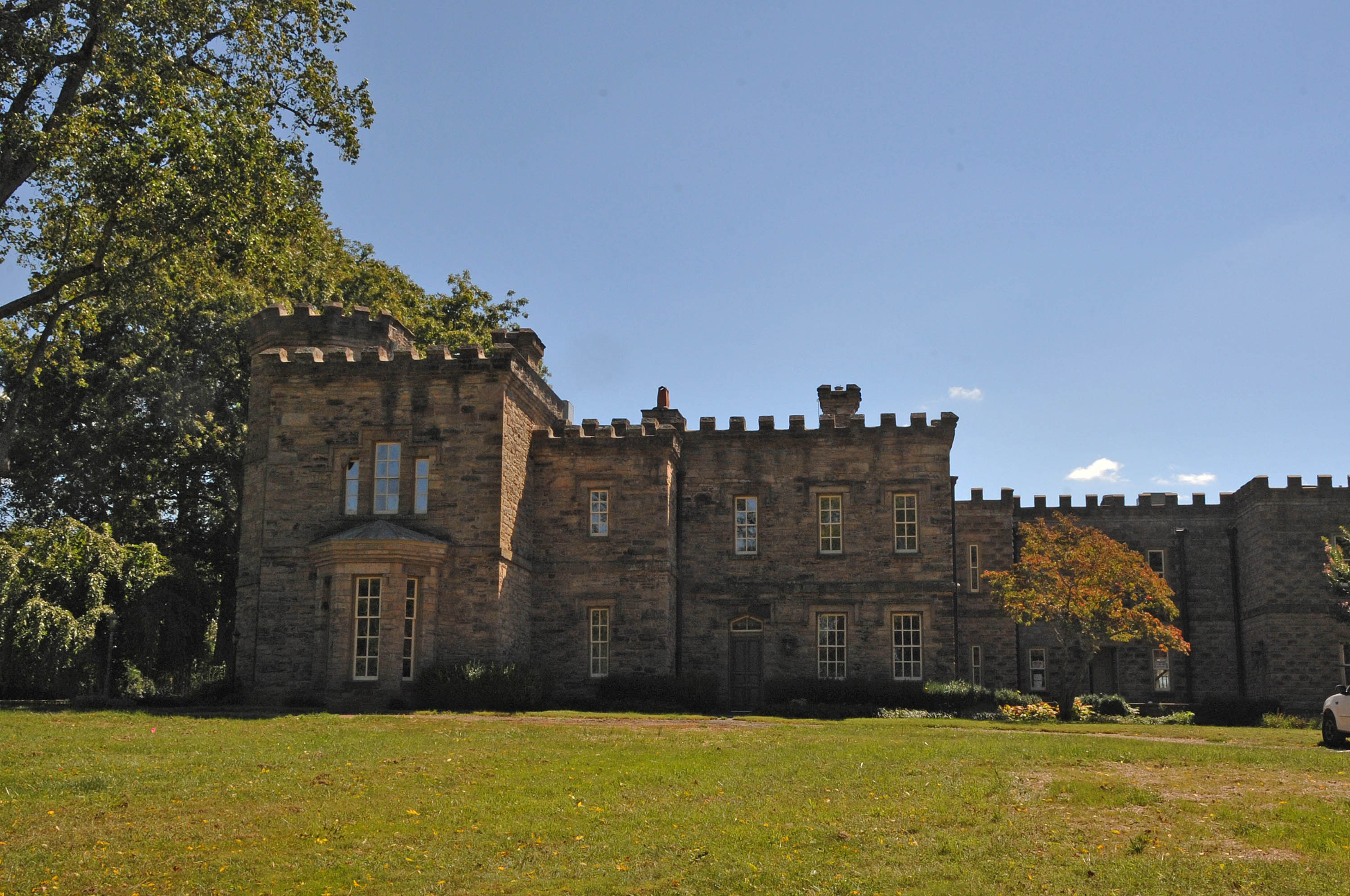

- Location within Northern Virginia Location within Virginia Location within the United States
- Location: North of Casanova on VA 602, near Casanova, Virginia
- Coordinates: 38°40′23″N 77°42′37″W
- Area: 24 acres (9.7 ha)
- Built: 1856–1860, 1920
- Built by: Holtzclaw, George Washington
- Architectural style: Gothic Revival
- NRHP reference No.: 83003281
- VLR No.: 030-0070

Significant dates
- Added to NRHP: February 10, 1983
- Designated VLR: September 5, 1981

Melrose, also known as Melrose Castle, is a historic home located near Casanova, Fauquier County, Virginia. The house was built between 1856 and 1860, and is a two-story, five-bay, L-shaped Gothic Revival style dwelling. It features a three-story-octagonal tower in the center bay and castellation along the parapet. The house was enlarged considerably around 1920 through a large addition to the west end for expanded service areas.

It was listed on the National Register of Historic Places in 1983.

== History ==
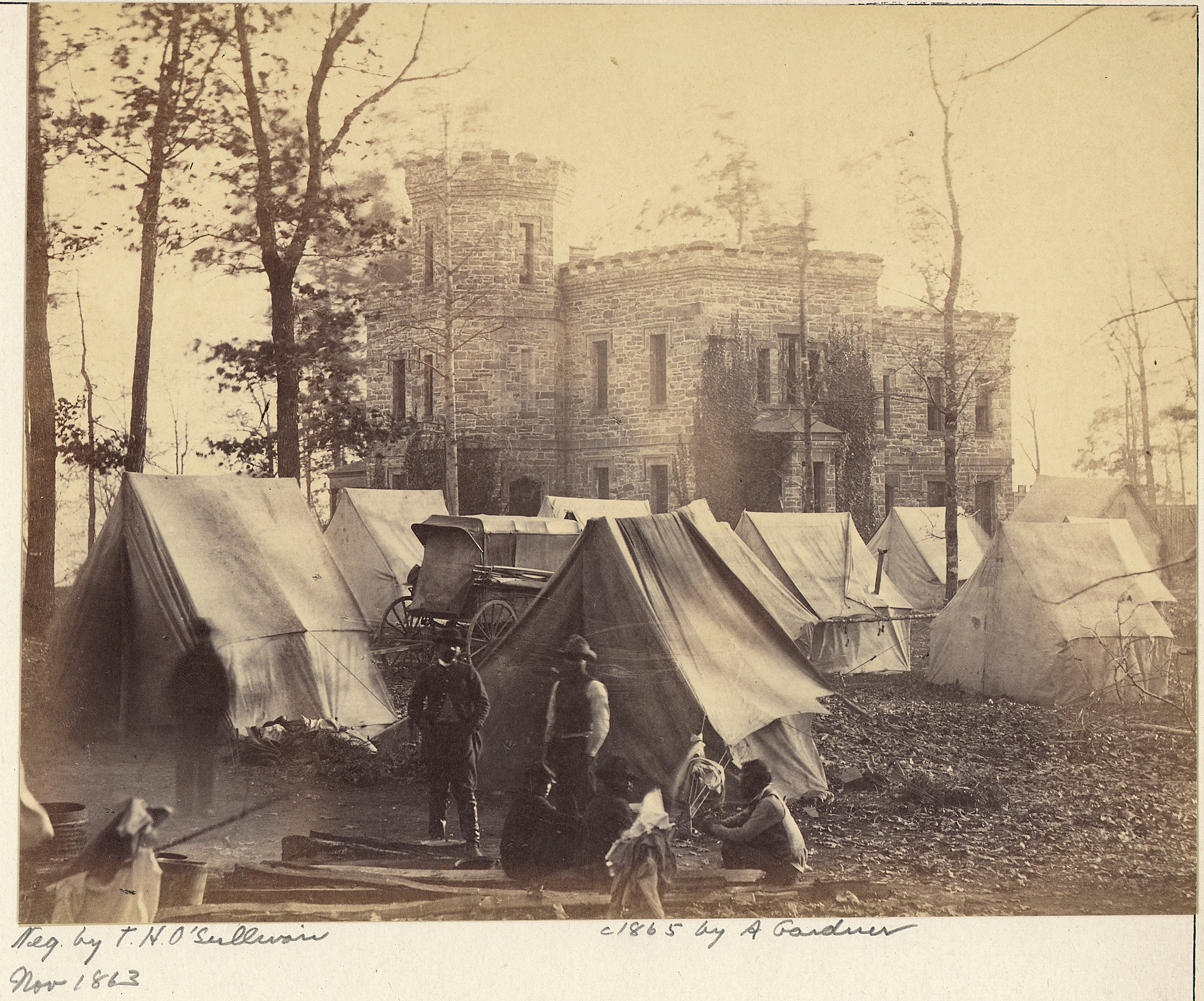
Melrose, then called Castle Murray, occupied by Federal troops during the Civil War (November 1863)

Melrose was built between 1856 and 1860 by Philadelphia architect George Washington Holtzclaw for brothers Dr. James H. Murray and Edward Murray. They named it after Melrose Abbey, a castle in their ancestral home of Scotland. Melrose was occupied by Union soldiers during the American Civil War in April 1862, and it later served as a hospital.

The property was first sold in December 1863, and then it changed hands many times. The 9,000 square-foot house and 50-acre wooded lot were listed for sale at $2.2 million in 2017.

== Cultural references ==
A visit to Melrose Castle inspired mystery writer Mary Roberts Rinehart to write her bestselling novel The Circular Staircase (1908).
