= Casanova, Virginia =

Unincorporated community in Virginia, United States

- Unincorporated community
- Location within Northern Virginia Location within Virginia Location within the United States
- Coordinates: 38°39′27″N 77°43′01″W
- Country: United States
- State: Virginia
- County: Fauquier
- Founded: 1854
- Named after: Juan Casanova
- Elevation: 377 ft (115 m)

Population (2020)
  - Total: 211
- Time zone: UTC−5 (Eastern (EST))
  - Summer (DST): UTC−4 (EDT)
- ZIP codes: 20139
- Area code: 540
- GNIS feature ID: 1492724

Casanova is a small, historic village in Fauquier County, Virginia, known for its well-preserved late 19th and early 20th-century buildings, including a rare steam-powered mill, a historic inn, and the Melrose Castle (now a private residence). Founded in 1854, originally called "Three Mile Station," it grew around the railroad stop and was renamed to "Melrose Station," before later being renamed to Casanova to avoid confusion with another community, honoring the Murray family's connection to the name. The area is now a quiet, rural community. The community had a foxhunting club called the Casanova Hunt, started in 1909, it was known for its traditional equestrian events like foxhunts, hunter paces, and steeplechase races. Unfortunately it ceased operations in 2020 due to a declining fox population caused by coyotes, and suburban sprawl, ending a 111 year old tradition.

The Casanova Historic District was listed on the National Register of Historic Places in 2005. Other listings are Melrose Castle (also known simply as Melrose) and Weston.

== Notable person ==
- Martin Berkofsky, classical pianist and philanthropist
