= San Bartolomeo, Benevento =

Church building in Benevento, Italy

Coordinates: 41.1306°N 14.7787°E

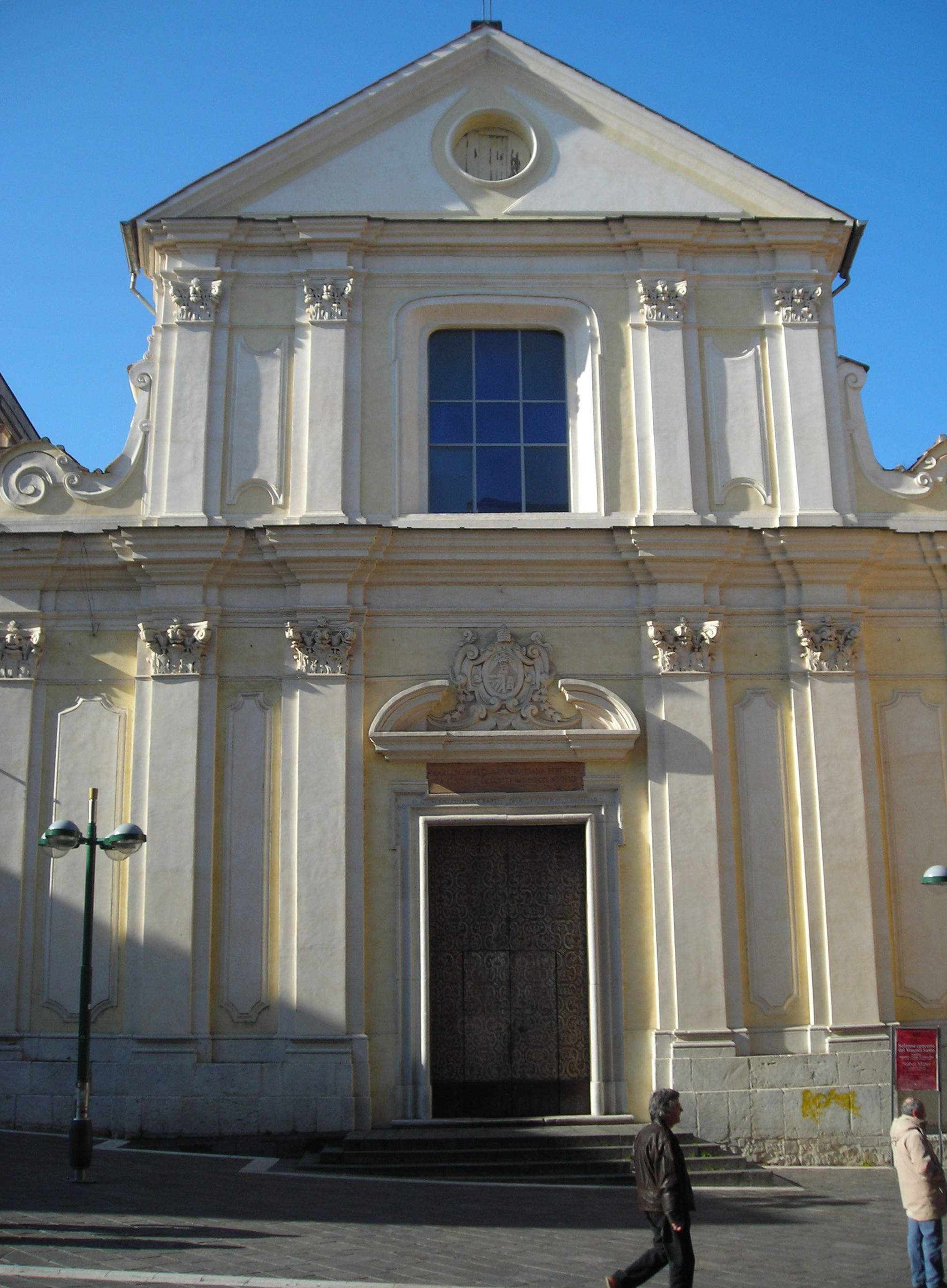
Façade of St. Bartholomew's Basilica, Benevento

San Bartolomeo Apostolo is a Catholic basilica located in piazza Federico Torre, along corso Garibaldi, in Benevento, region of Campania, Italy.

== History ==
A church of the same name is documented in Benevento since the 9th century, putatively holding the relics of the apostle. This prior church at the site was razed by an earthquake in 1688, and the present church was moved here and designed by either Filippo Raguzzini or Nicolò Coscia, and was reconsecrated by Pope Benedict XIII in 1729.
