= Martin Berkofsky =

American classical pianist (1943–2013)

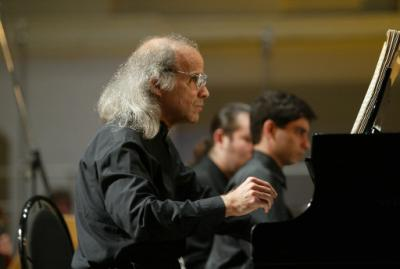
- Born: 9 April 1943; Washington, D.C
- Died: 30 December 2013 (aged 70)
- Occupation: Classical pianist

Martin Berkofsky (9 April 1943 – 30 December 2013) was an American classical pianist, known primarily for his interpretations of music by Franz Liszt and Alan Hovhaness.

== Early career and activities ==
Born in Washington, D.C., of Belarusian ancestry, Berkofsky began giving public performances from a young age. Later studies were with the Polish pianist Mieczysław Munz, with Konrad Wolff, and Walter Hautzig, as well as with Hans Kann in Vienna. He was active on VHF in the suburban Maryland area during his high school years, and in his later years, he was an amateur radio operator and assembled a VHF/UHF station on his property in Virginia.

Some of Berkofsky's earliest professional engagements were as a member of New York's Long Island Chamber Ensemble, of which he was pianist for three years. In 1971, the ensemble met the composer Alan Hovhaness, and they subsequently gave an all-Hovhaness concert at Carnegie Recital Hall, which included the premiere of Hovhaness's Saturn, op. 243, which Hovhaness had written for the ensemble.

During his early years, Berkofsky traveled to Europe and twice recorded the long-lost Concerto for Two Pianos and Orchestra of Max Bruch. The first time was with the pianist Nathan Twining and London Symphony Orchestra in 1974. The second recording was with pianist David Hagan and the Berlin Symphony Orchestra in 1978. In addition to his research on this Bruch concerto, Berkofsky also did similar restoration of a duo piano concerto composed jointly by Felix Mendelssohn and Ignaz Moscheles. He also discovered in Paris, and subsequently edited and published, a previously unknown manuscript by Franz Liszt.

== Later activities ==
After recovering from a motorcycle accident in Iceland in 1982, Berkofsky donated proceeds from some of his performances to various charitable causes. He later founded the Cristofori Foundation to facilitate this purpose.

To celebrate his 60th birthday and recovery from cancer, Berkofsky embarked on a marathon concert tour, "Celebrate Life Run", running 880 miles across America's heartland and raising over US$80,000 for cancer research. He ran a second marathon six years later, "All Men are Brothers", named after a symphony of Alan Hovhaness, from the summit of New Hampshire's Mount Monadnock, to the Arlington, Massachusetts boyhood home of the composer. In 2009, Berkofsky participated in a concert to fund and unveil a memorial to Hovhaness in Arlington.

In 2004, he presented the first Armenian performance of Hovhaness's piano concerto Lousadzak (1944), with the Alan Hovhaness Chamber Orchestra of Yerevan. With pianist Atakan Sarı, he gave the world premiere performance in Moscow of Hovhaness' 1954 Concerto for Two Pianos and Orchestra with the Globalis Symphony Orchestra. In 2005, he presented the Turkish premiere of Lousadzak with the Orchestra Academic Başkent, Ankara, perhaps the first performance of a Hovhaness work in that nation. That same year, his and Atakan Sari's recording of Hovhaness' Concerto for Two Pianos and Orchestra was released. In November 2006, again with Sarı, he gave the Armenian premiere of the Hovhaness Concerto for Two Pianos and Orchestra, with the Armenian Philharmonic Orchestra in Yerevan. Another Hovhaness Armenian premiere was given in April 2008, with the Armenian Philharmonic Orchestra in Yerevan, this time, Hovhaness' early "Prayer-Piano Concerto for Symphony Orchestra". At the same time, Berkofsky was awarded a Diploma by the Ministry of Culture of Armenia for his services to Armenian music. For a number of years he was one of the coordinators of a project to establish a central archive of Hovhaness' work in Yerevan, Armenia.

== Personal life ==
Berkofsky lived in Casanova, Virginia and later Warrenton, Virginia. He married in Iceland and lived there from 1982 until 1987. He died from cancer on 30 December 2013.

== Discography ==
Berkofsky has recorded for the EMI, Arts, Cristofori, Black Box, Koch International, Crystal, Vox Allegretto, Nimbus, Vox-Turnabout, FONO, Angel, Poseidon Society, and Musical Heritage Society labels.

- 1972 – Alan Hovhaness: Saturn, Op. 243. Long Island Chamber Ensemble of New York (Kate Hurney, soprano; Lawrence Sobol, clarinet; Martin Berkofsky, piano). LP. New York: Poseidon.
- 1972 – Alan Hovhaness: Khaldis, Op. 91. Ensemble conducted by Lawrence Sobol. LP. New York: Poseidon.
- 1974 – Max Bruch: Concerto for Two Pianos and Orchestra in A-flat minor, Op. 88a; 6 Klavierstücke, Op. 12; 2 Klavierstücke, Op. 14. Martin Berkofsky, piano; Nathan Twining, piano (in the concerto); London Symphony Orchestra, dir. Antal Dorati. LP. Hollywood, California: Angel.
- 1976 – Johann Sebastian Bach: The Brandenburg Concerti. Transcribed for piano duet by Max Reger. Martin Berkofsky, piano; David Hagan, piano. 2 LPs. Oakhurst, New Jersey: Musical Heritage Society.
- 1978 – Max Bruch: Concerto for Two Pianos and Orchestra, Op. 88a in A-flat minor; Fantasy for Two Pianos in D minor, Op. 11; Schwedische Tänze (Swedish Dances) for piano four-hands, Op. 63 (originally for violin and piano; arranged by the composer). Martin Berkofsky and David Hagan, pianos; Berlin Symphony Orchestra, dir. Lutz Herbig. LP. Turnabout.
- 1981 – Johann Sebastian Bach: The Four Orchestral Suites, S. 1066–1069. Transcribed for piano duet by Max Reger. Martin Berkofsky, piano; David Hagan, piano (four hands). 2 LPs. Tinton Falls, New Jersey: Musical Heritage Society.
- 1994 – Max Bruch: Works for Violin and Two Pianos (Violin Concerto no. 1 in G minor, Op. 26; Concerto for Two Pianos and Orchestra in A-flat minor, Op. 88a; Fantasy for Two Pianos in D minor, Op. 11; Schwedische Tänze (Swedish Dances), for piano four hands, Op. 63. Ruggiero Ricci, violin; Bochum Symphony, dir. Matthias Kuntzsch; Martin Berkofsky, David Hagan, pianos; Berlin Symphony Orchestra, dir. Lutz Herbig. CD. Englewood Cliffs, New Jersey: Vox Allegretto.
- 1997 – Franz Liszt. Piano music played by Martin Berkofsky (Rhapsodie hongroise no. 12; La Vallée d'Obermann; Legende: St. François de Paule marchant sur les flots; Aprés une lecture du Dante (Fantasia quasi Sonata). CD. Casanova, Virginia: Cristofori Foundation.
- 1997 – Alan Hovhaness: Armenian Rhapsodies 1, 2, and 3; My Soul Is a Bird, from Symphony no. 38, Op. 314; Lullaby, from Symphony no. 38, Op. 314; Concerto no. 10 for piano, trumpet, and strings, Op. 413. Hinako Fujihara, coloratura soprano; Scott Goff, flute; Martin Berkofsky, piano; Chris Butler, trumpet; Seattle Symphony Orchestra, dir. Gerard Schwarz. [Austria]: Koch Schwann.
- 1999 – Nicolae Bretan: Sacred Songs. Phyllis Bryn-Julson, soprano; Ludovic Konya, baritone; Ronald Stalford; Donald S. Sutherland, organ; Ferdinand Weiss; Martin Berkofsky, piano. CD. Wyastone Leys, Monmouth: Nimbus.
- 2005 – Alan Hovhaness: Concerto for Two Pianos and Orchestra; Mihr; Ko-ola-u; Vijag; Lousadzak: Concerto for Piano and Orchestra. Martin Berkofsky, piano; Atakan Sari, piano; Sergei Podobedov, piano; Nikolai Zherenkov, violin; Globalis Symphony Orchestra, dir. Konstantin Krimets. CD. [England]: Black Box.
- 2007 – Ludwig van Beethoven: Choral Fantasy. Martin Berkofsky, piano; Globalis Symphony Orchestra, dir. Konstantin Krimets, Chorus of the Music College of the Moscow Conservatory. Johanness Brahms: Two Sonatas for clarinet and piano; Einar Johannesson, clarinet; Martin Berkofsky, piano. Robert Schumann: Fantasiestucke for clarinet and piano; Einar Johannesson, clarinet, Martin Berkofsky, piano. CD, Casanova, VA, Cristofori Foundation.
- 2007 – Nicolae Bretan: "The Songs of Nicolae Bretan". Alexandru Agache, baritone, Martin Berkofsky, piano. CD. Wyastone Leys, Monmouth: Nimbus.
- 2011 – Franz Liszt: "Visions" piano works; Étude d’exécution transcendante no. 11 "Harmonies du Soir" S 139, Légende no. 1: St. Françoisd'Assise. La prédication aux oiseaux S 173:1, Légende no. 2: St. François de Paule marchant sur les flots S 173:2, Ave Maria "Die Glocken von Rom" S 182, Hungarian Rhapsody no. 12 S 244, Sancta Dorothea S 187, Étude d’exécution transcendante no. 7 "Vision" S 139, Pater Noster from Harmonies poétiques et religieuses S 173, Martin Berkofsky, piano, Hybrid SACD. Germany, ARTS Music.
- 2011 – Ludwig van Beethoven "HOPE". Benefit for Assistance in Health Care and Donatori di Musica. Ludwig van Beethoven: Choral Fantasy. Martin Berkofsky, piano; Globalis Symphony Orchestra, dir. Konstantin Krimets, Chorus of the Music College of the Moscow Conservatory. Sonata Op. 2 No. 2, Martin Berkofsky, piano. Sonata Op. 110, Atakan Sari, piano, Sonata Op. 27 No. 2, Roberto Prosseda, piano. CD. US, Casanova, VA, Cristofori Foundation.
- 2012 – Alan Hovhaness "Alan Hovhaness * Martin Berkofsky, The Historic Moscow Recordings". Concerto for Two Pianos and Orchestra, Mihr, Vijag, Ko-ola-u, Lousadzak with Martin Berkofsky, Atakan Sari, Sergei Podobedov, pianos; Andrei Ikov, trumpet; Nicolai Zherenkov, violin; Globalis Symphony Orchestra conducted by Konstantin Krimets. CD. US, Casanova, VA, Cristofori Foundation.

== Filmography ==
- American Profile: Martin Berkofsky (2008). Produced by Irina Robertson for the Voice of America.
- Pater Noster] (2012) Produced by Michele Miccarrone at TAU Studios, Sicily.
