= Judiciary Square station =

Metro rail station in Washington, D.C.

Judiciary Square
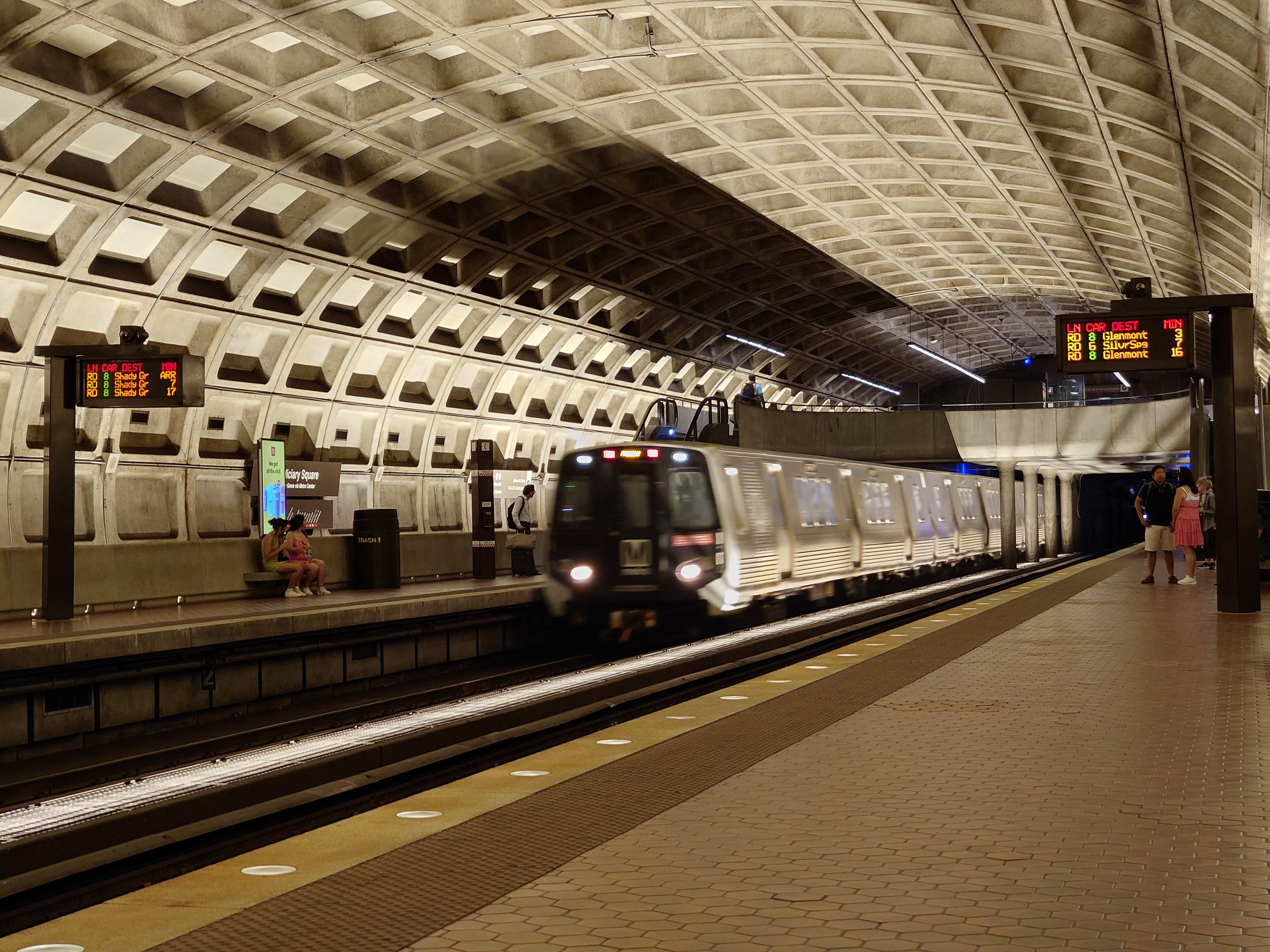
- Judiciary Square station in June 2023

General information
- Location: 450 F Street NW; Washington, D.C.
- Coordinates: 38.896084°N 77.016643°W
- Owner: Washington Metropolitan Area Transit Authority
- Platforms: 2 side platforms
- Tracks: 2
- Connections: Metrobus: D20, D24, D30

Construction
- Structure type: Underground
- Cycle facilities: Capital Bikeshare, 18 racks
- Accessible: Yes

Other information
- Station code: B02

History
- Opened: March 27, 1976; 50 years ago

Passengers
- 2025: 4,992 (average weekday)
- Rank: 30 of 98

Services
Preceding station	Washington Metro	Following station
Gallery Place toward Shady Grove	Red Line	Union Station toward Glenmont

Former services
Preceding station	Washington Metro	Following station
Gallery Place toward Farragut North	Green Line Commuter Shortcut	Union Station toward Greenbelt
Route map
Location

Judiciary Square station is a Washington Metro station in Washington, D.C., on the Red Line. It is located in the Judiciary Square neighborhood in the Northwest quadrant of the city, with entrances at 4th and D Street and 5th and F Street. It serves the many courthouses and municipal buildings in the area. The 5th and F Street entrance is located in the National Law Enforcement Officers Memorial, which incorporates the escalators and elevators into its architecture.

== History ==
Service began on March 27, 1976. This station is also the birthplace of the Metro, as the initial groundbreaking was held here on December 9, 1969.

During a September 2012 refurbishment of the station, new signage was installed. Similar signage can be found at the Gallery Place, NoMa–Gallaudet U, Morgan Boulevard, Grosvenor-Strathmore, and Largo Town Center stations. It is the only station with two-sided platforms with elevators between each platform and street.

From March 26 to June 28, 2020, this station was closed due to the 2020 coronavirus pandemic.

Between January 15 to January 21, 2021, this station was closed because of security concerns due to the 2021 Inauguration.

== Station layout ==
The station has two tracks with two side platforms and a mezzanine on either end. Each mezzanine has fare gates and escalators reaching the street level. At the northwest end of the platforms, a pair of elevators directly serve the platforms, each with a single fare gate and ticket machine.

== Notable places nearby ==
- Federal courthouses: United States Court of Appeals for the Armed Forces, E. Barrett Prettyman United States Courthouse, United States Court of Appeals for Veterans Claims, United States Tax Court
- Municipal buildings: H. Carl Moultrie Courthouse, District of Columbia Court of Appeals, and One Judiciary Square
- United States Department of Labor
- Fraternal Order of Police Headquarters
- Government Accountability Office
- Federal Bureau of Investigation Washington Field Office
- Georgetown University Law Center
- National Building Museum
- National Law Enforcement Officers Memorial
- United States Army Corps of Engineers Headquarters
