= Henry Daly Building =

Municipal building in Washington, D.C.

Henry J. Daly Building
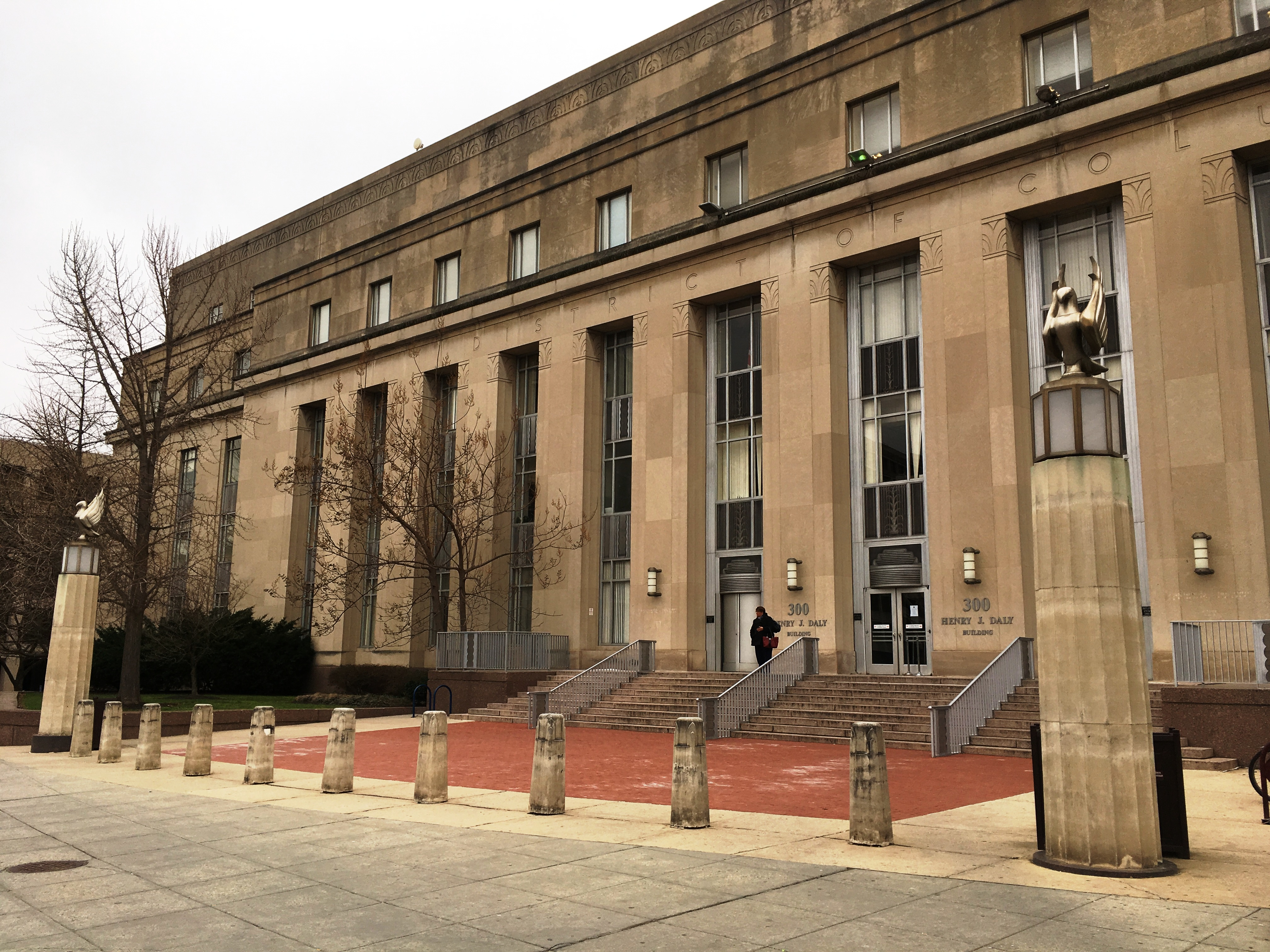
- Henry J. Daly Building (Indiana Avenue entrance) in 2018

- Location within the District of Columbia Location within the United States

General information
- Architectural style: Classical Moderne
- Location: 300 Indiana Avenue, NW; Washington, D.C.
- Coordinates: 38.8942°N 77.0165°W
- Completed: 1941; 85 years ago

Design and construction
- Architects: Nathan C. Wyeth and the D.C. Office of the Municipal Architect
- District of Columbia Municipal Center and Plaza
- U.S. National Register of Historic Places
- NRHP reference No.: 100004189
- Added to NRHP: July 19, 2019

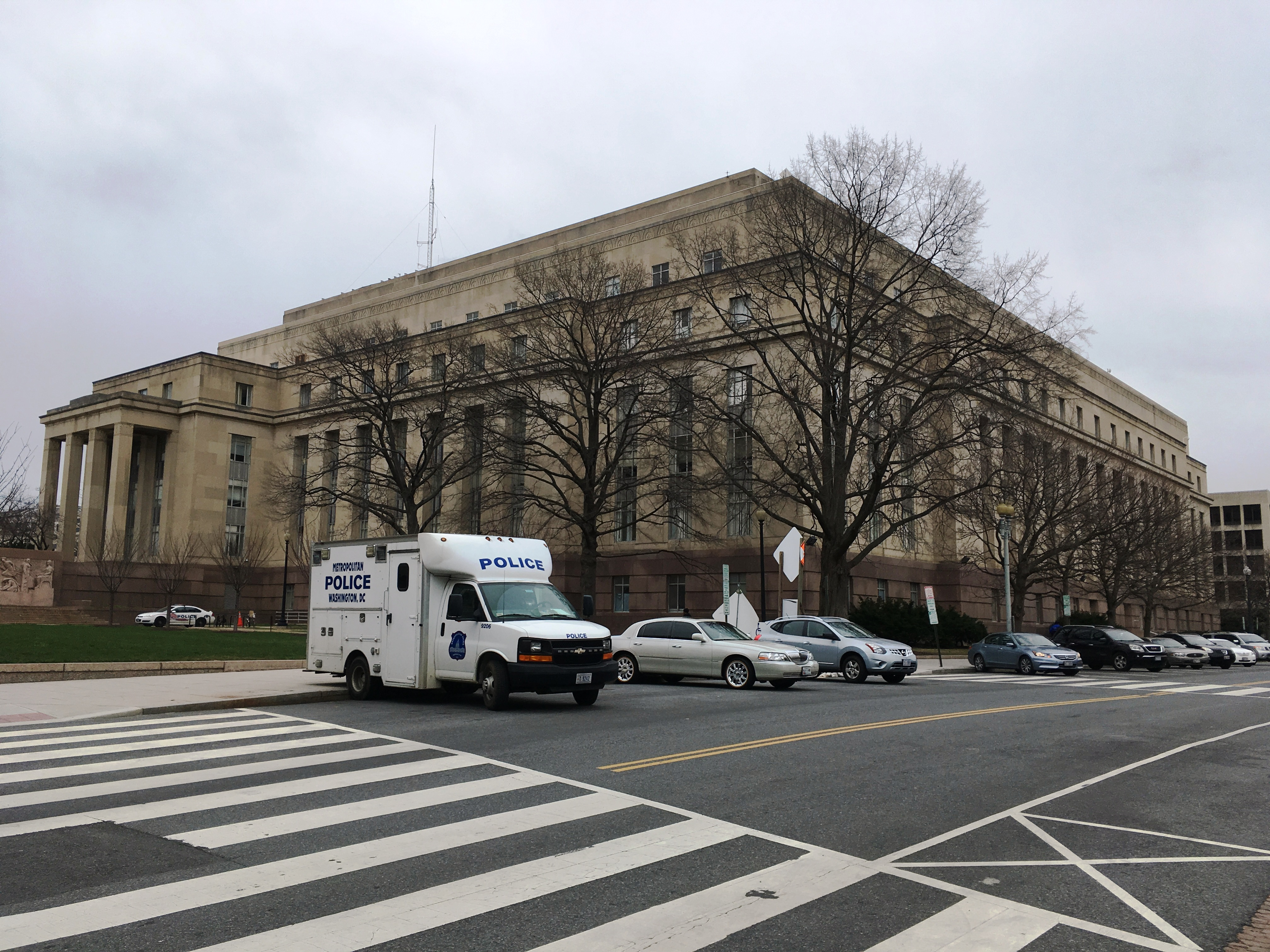
C Street looking northeast

The Henry J. Daly Building (previously known as the Municipal Center and also referred to as 300 Indiana and the Daly Building) is located at 300 Indiana Avenue, NW, and 301 C Street, NW, in the Judiciary Square neighborhood of Washington, D.C., United States. The administrative building is owned by the government of the District of Columbia and has served as the home of various city offices since it opened in 1941 as a unified location for previously dispersed municipal functions. Currently, the building is primarily occupied by the Metropolitan Police Department; although the District of Columbia Department of Corrections, the District of Columbia Office of the Chief Financial Officer and the Court Services and Offender Supervision Agency (CSOSA) also maintain offices in the building.

== Background, 1790–1926 ==
In his 1791 plan for the federal city, Major Pierre (Peter) Charles L’Enfant had intended the area known as Judiciary Square to be the conglomerated home of the federal judiciary, however by 1840 the square was home to a number of city functions, and by the close of the nineteenth century featured a mix of federal and local government offices.

At the start of the twentieth century, this mixture of federal and local government offices was true for much of the city, and this dispersion started to create problems for both as the federal workforce and city population expanded with the United States' entrance onto the world stage. The federal government was first to attempt a concentration of its administrative functions in the district with the planning of Federal Triangle during the Calvin Coolidge administration. The massive complex of seven buildings situated along Pennsylvania Avenue downtown was not completed until the New Deal in the 1930s, but, once finished, achieved its goal of unifying a number of federal government offices.

Calls for a similar solution to crowded and dispersed municipal functions resulted in Congressional approval in 1926 (the same year Federal Triangle was funded) of an idea to unify municipal courts at Judiciary Square. Eventually, these plans also called for the unification of other municipal functions at Judiciary Square to absorb overcrowded city offices, particularly those of the police department.

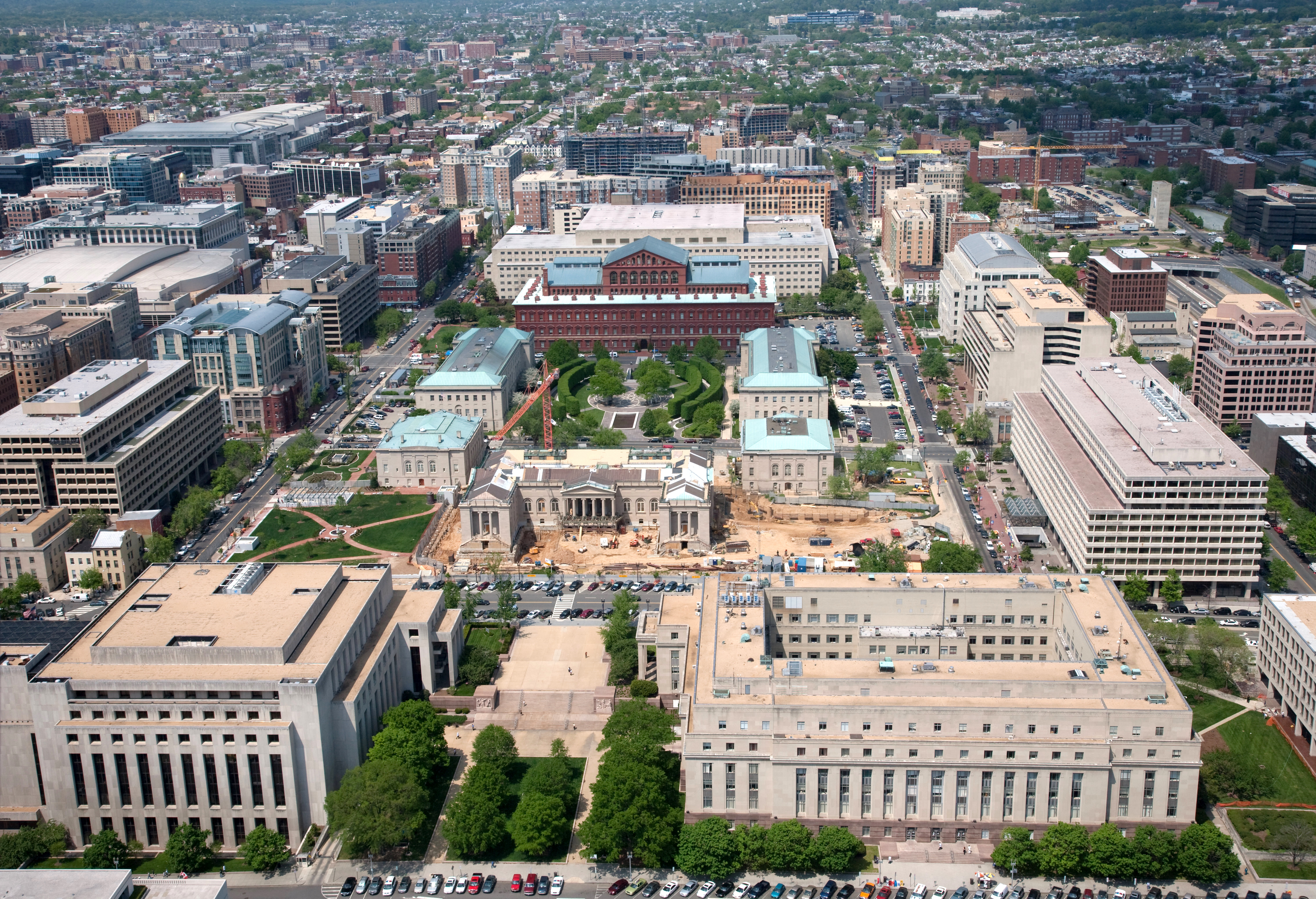
Juciciary Square, the Henry J. Daly Building is at the bottom right corner

== Planning and construction, 1926–1941 ==
The proposed concentration of so many city courts and services at Judiciary Square would require a host of new buildings to fill a campus, which municipal architect Albert L. Harris started to plan in 1926. However, years of trouble slowed Harris's plans as numerous battles with the federal government and Commission of Fine Arts erupted over various issues, including; funding and cost; the specific site of buildings; the architectural relationship with nearby Federal Triangle and the Mall; the specific location of courts and offices; the number of buildings; the demolition of neighborhood buildings; and especially the financial difficulties and priorities of the Great Depression. Along with the staff of the Office of the Municipal Architect, Harris continued to work through these issues and design the campus, until he died in 1934. Upon the death of Harris, Nathan Corwith Wyeth became Municipal Architect. Wyeth, a native of Chicago and an accomplished architect, was associated with the Washington firm Allied Architects and was a close advisor to Harris.

According to the National Register of Historic Places nomination for the Daly Building, “[i]t is impossible to identify any architect’s personal design contributions” to the complex, as almost “all known plans, drawings, and blueprints...are attributed to ‘the Office of the Municipal Architect’.” However, “...Wyeth was the key influence in shaping the Municipal Center Campus.” Yet the ultimate success of the project also depended on Wyeth’s fellow partners at Allied Architects and from the staff of the Office of the Municipal Architect, whose expertise was essential to the process. And it continued to be a frustratingly slow process. But, finally, between 1936 and 1938, a series of Congressional appropriations and Public Works Administration loans finally allowed construction of the Daly Building to begin in 1938. Washington Post reporter James D. Secrest summed it up well, writing on September 4, 1938 that "Washingtonians, who have followed the National Capital's progress for the past decade, rubbed their eyes and muttered incantations at the press announcement last week that construction of the Municipal Center finally had been assured." It was complete by 1941.

Yet, original plans had called for a number of other municipal buildings to be built to form a campus around the completed Daly Building in Judiciary Square. But the rest of the intended campus of municipal buildings was never completed, except for the Recorder of Deeds building and a portion of the Central Library office (referred to as the “Library Annex,” it was later demolished to make space for the Canadian Embassy). Land intended for a Municipal Auditorium later hosted the E. Barrett Prettyman United States Courthouse, and a plot set aside for the West Building of the Municipal Center became the home of the D.C. Superior Court.

South side

== Opening and use, 1941–present ==
=== 20th century ===
The first city employees moved into the Daly building on May 19, 1941. However, they were only allowed to use half the structure, as wartime needs prompted the city to allow the federal government to temporarily take over the other half. City offices located in the building initially included the Police Department, Traffic Department, Refuse Department, Fire Department, and Health Laboratory. Currently, the building hosts the Metropolitan Police Department and the Department of Motor Vehicles.

In the years that followed, the building was never a favorite of the citizens, considering that the only reason most residents entered the building was for the Department of Motor Vehicles. A 1983 Washington Post article noted that "[f]or many people, merely the mention of the place is enough to conjure up chilling visions of bottomless file cabinets, brusque government clerks and a twilight zone of bureaucratic runarounds." One person even called the 576,000 square foot building "the pinnacle of bureaucracy." And recently, in 2016, Mayor Muriel Bowser, as quoted in the Washington Business Journal, opined that "[s]ometimes people exaggerate, but it’s probably the worst building in [in the city's] entire portfolio," when she talked about updating the building.

=== 1994 shooting ===
The building was the site of a mass shooting on November 22, 1994. Two FBI agents, Martha Dixon Martinez and Michael J. Miller, and Metropolitan Police Sergeant Henry J. Daly, were shot and killed by a murder suspect who had entered the building armed with a TEC-9. A third FBI agent and a civilian were also wounded. The shooter, Bennie Lee Lawson, was a member of the First and Kennedy Street Crew, whose members, including Lawson, were under investigation for a triple homicide that occurred in October 1994. Lawson, believing he was about to be charged with the murders, intended to target the DC police's homicide unit that was investigating the case, but accidentally targeted the office of the cold case homicide unit instead. Lawson himself was found dead by the S.W.A.T. Team, having committed suicide with Agent Martinez's pistol after she shot him in the hip before she was killed. The Washington Post described "Hank" Daly as "a storied homicide detective with nearly three decades on the D.C. police force" and "a dogged investigator who loved his work and a hero and mentor to younger detectives." According to the MPD website, Sergeant Daly, aged 51, left behind a wife and two children. The following year the Municipal Center was renamed the Henry J. Daly Building in his honor.

=== 21st century ===
The building, which has fallen into disrepair (writing as of 6/12/2026), now only houses the Central Cell Block that processes arrestees for presentment to court and to the DC Jail. There is no current plan to renovate the decaying building, and all of the police units, the DMV, and probation services have moved out.

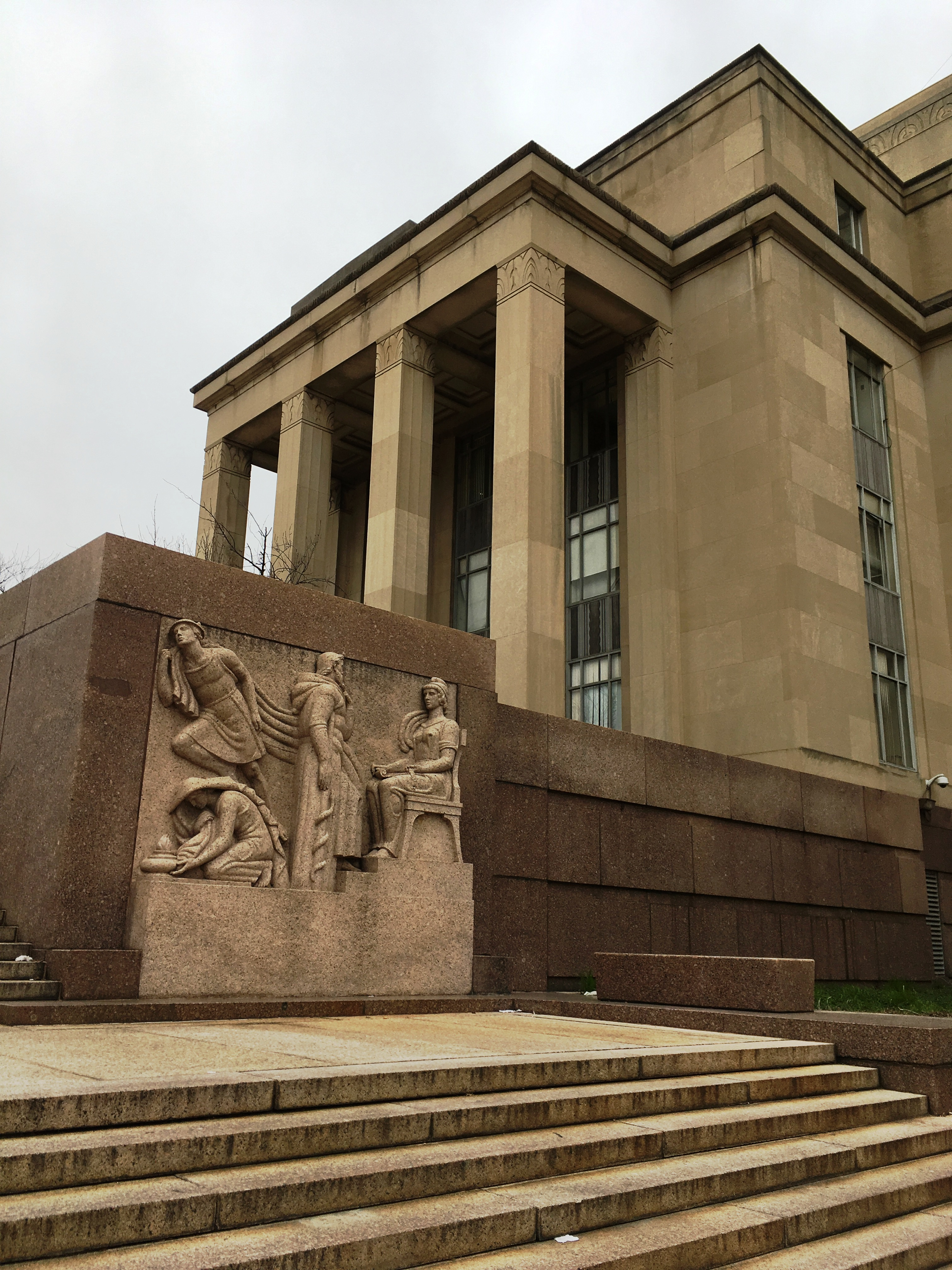
One of the bas reliefs next to the plaza staircase

== Art and architecture ==
Like many other civic buildings constructed during the New Deal, the Daly Building is an example of the Classical Moderne style. The National Register of Historic Places nomination for the Daly Building notes that “[a]mong the defining Classical Moderne features of the building are its ziggurat configuration achieved through the progressive setback of its upper stories and its use of the abstracted classical form.” Although some had originally called for a Colonial Revival design, the architects of the Municipal Center wanted its design to complement the nearby Hadfield Courthouse and Federal Triangle.

To make up for its overall, spartan appearance (keeping with New Deal ideals), the building contains a good deal of public art, including bas reliefs next to the plaza staircase by Lee Lawrie and John Gregory. There are also murals made from ceramic tiles in the interior courtyards by Hildreth Meiere and Waylande Gregory. A tile mosaic on the C Street lobby floor depicting a map of the District of Columbia by Eric Menke was described by Alexander M. Padro in a January 2000 letter to The Washington Post as a "...giant, brilliantly colored and detailed map of the city...made from tens of thousands of tiny pieces of colored stone." On the Indiana Avenue side is the DC Police Memorial Fountain by John J. Earley, built in 1942 with Italian marble at the hands of Italian immigrants. The idea for such a memorial had been simmering for years, but it finally received funding in 1940. It honors all DC Metropolitan Police Officers who have died in the line of duty.

Washington, DC Metropolitan Police Memorial located at 300 Indiana Avenue, NW. In 2023, the fountain was renovated and a memorial wall added.

The Washington, DC Metropolitan Police Memorial fountain in front of the northwest corner of the building, which was neglected over the years, was repaired and rededicated in 2023. This was in conjunction with the erection of a new memorial wall that records the names of the fallen members of the DC Metropolitan Police Department. The effort was accomplished through the non-profit Metropolitan Police Memorial and Museum, Inc. ("DC Police Memorial") and a generous donation by former DC Police Officer and Chairman of the Washington Post, Donald Graham. This organization is also constructing a Metropolitan Police museum that will be housed on the 11th floor of 441 4th Street, Northwest, directly across Indiana Avenue from the Henry J. Daly building.

== Significance ==
According to the National Register of Historic Places nomination, the Municipal Center is historically significant because it "represents...urbanization and the expanding role of government, especially in the areas of public safety and social welfare services, as well as the development of modern municipal administration for the District." In addition, it sits as a physical manifestation of the New Deal in the city, as PWA grants helped fund its construction and it showcases the Classical Moderne style often associated with public buildings from that program. And, on a local level, the idea behind the building's conception, the unification of city services, represents the district's long history of gaining political autonomy from the federal government. The Municipal Center is a tangible landmark on the long road to the District of Columbia Home Rule Act of 1973.

In February 2018, thanks to efforts by the D.C. Preservation League, the Daly Building was officially designated a District of Columbia historic landmark.
