= Chief Justice John Marshall =

Statue by William Wetmore Story

- Sculpture in 2010
- Artist: William Wetmore Story
- Year: 1883
- Type: Bronze
- Dimensions: 190 cm × 130 cm × 196.9 cm (75 in × 51 in × 77 1/2 in)
- Location: United States Supreme Court, 1 First Street, Washington, D.C. N.E., U.S.
- Owner: US Supreme Court; General Services Administration (recast); Fairmount Park Commission(recast)

Chief Justice John Marshall is a bronze sculpture of John Marshall, by American sculptor William Wetmore Story. It is located at the United States Supreme Court building in Washington, D.C.. The sculptor's father, Joseph Story, served on the Supreme Court with Marshall for over two decades.

Cast in Rome by the founder Alessandro Nelli, the monument was dedicated on May 10, 1884, by Morrison Waite. It was relocated from the West Terrace, of the United States Capitol.

Two recasts exist:

- John Marshall Park near Judiciary Square at C and 3rd streets, Washington, D.C., N.W.,38.8933°N 77.0176°W
- Philadelphia Museum of Art, 26th Street and Benjamin Franklin Parkway, Philadelphia.39.9662°N 75.1818°W

The inscription for the Philadelphia recast reads: W. W. STORY ROMA 1883
J. ARTHUR LIMERICK CO
FOUNDERS-BALTO-MD
(Base, east side:)
PRESENTED TO THE
CITY OF PHILADELPHIA
BY JAMES M. BUCK
1931
(seal of the Fairmount Park Art Association)
(Base, west side:)
JOHN MARSHALL
CHIEF JUSTICE
OF THE UNITED STATES
1801–1835
AS SOLDIER HE FOUGHT THAT THE
NATION MIGHT COME INTO BEING
AS EXPOUNDER OF THE CONSTITUTION
HE GAVE IT LENGTH OF DAYS

== See also ==
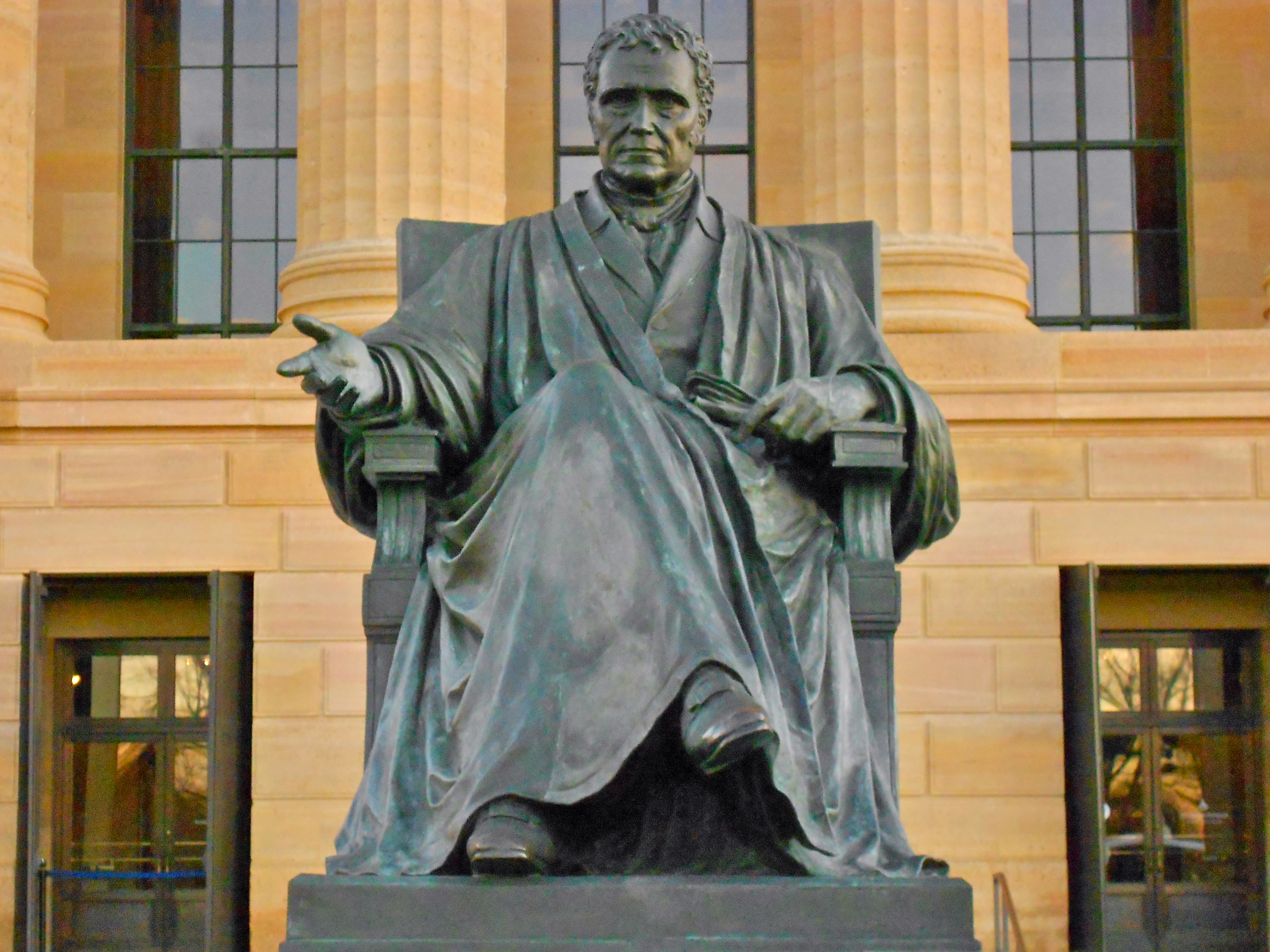
Philadelphia recast at the Philadelphia Museum of Art

- List of public art in Philadelphia
- List of public art in Washington, D.C., Ward 6
