= Statue of William Blackstone =

Statue by Paul Wayland Bartlett in Washington, D.C., U.S.

Sir William Blackstone
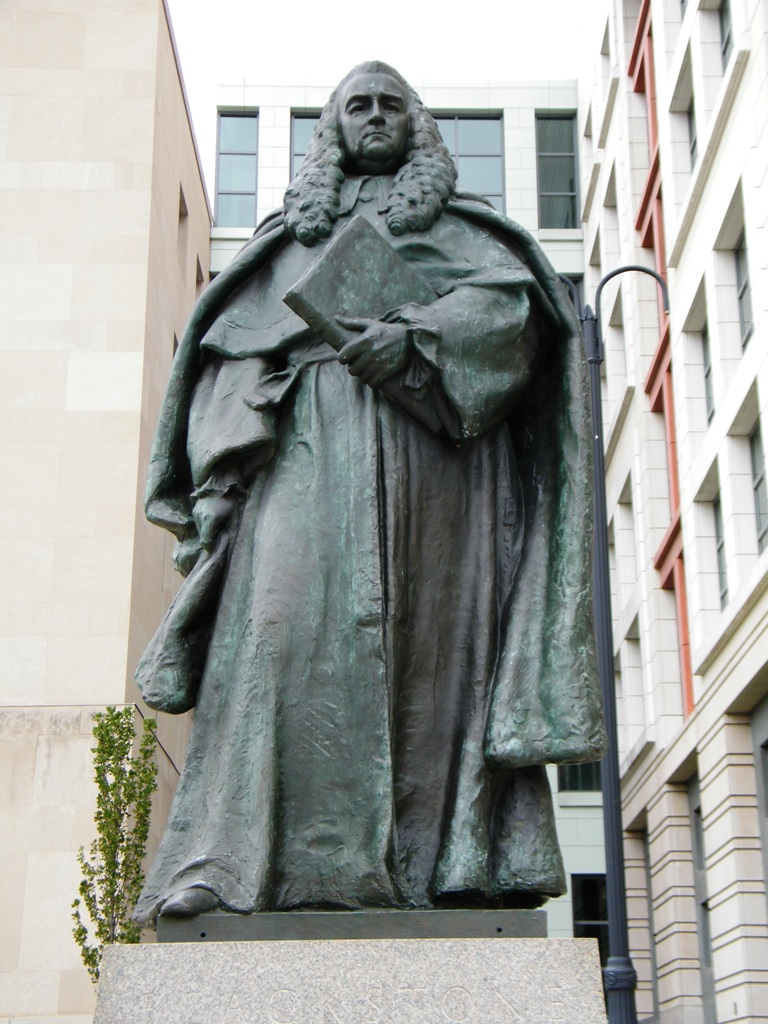
- Artist: Paul Wayland Bartlett
- Year: 1920
- Type: bronze
- Dimensions: 2.7 m (9 ft)
- Location: Washington, D.C., United States; 38°53′33″N 77°00′57″W
- Owner: National Park Service

Sir William Blackstone is a bronze statue by Paul Wayland Bartlett of the English legal scholar William Blackstone. It is located at E. Barrett Prettyman United States Courthouse, at 333 Pennsylvania Avenue in northwest Washington, D.C., in the Judiciary Square neighborhood. It was installed on August 11, 1943.

== See also ==
- List of public art in Washington, D.C., Ward 6
