= Trinity Episcopal Church (Washington, D.C.) =

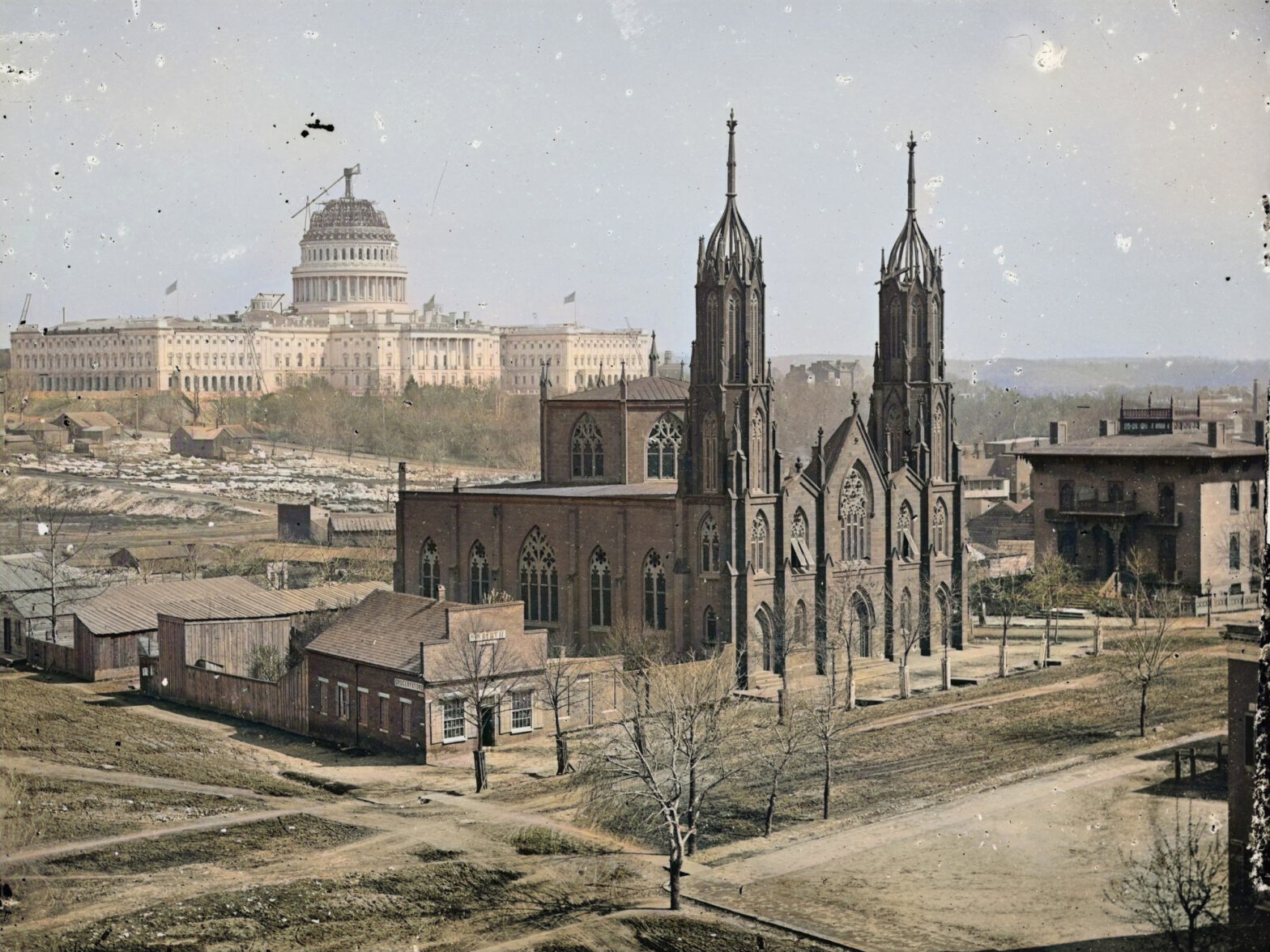
- Trinity Episcopal Church in 1862 with the United States Capitol in the background
- Interactive map of the Trinity Episcopal Church area

General information
- Architectural style: Gothic Revival
- Location: Washington, DC, United-States
- Coordinates: 38°53′36″N 77°00′54″W
- Completed: 1851
- Demolished: 1936

Design and construction
- Architect: James Renwick Jr.

Trinity Episcopal Church was an Episcopal church that stood from 1851 to 1936 on the northeast corner of 3rd and C Streets NW in the Judiciary Square neighborhood of Washington, D.C.

Founded in 1827, the parish was home to prominent attendees including President John Quincy Adams, Senator Daniel Webster, and Francis Scott Key, who served as the church's senior warden. The first church building was located on 5th Street NW, across the street from District of Columbia City Hall, in what was then a fashionable area of the city. The parish grew and began planning a new church building. With financial assistance from William Wilson Corcoran, the parish bought the lot with which the church is best associated, and a cornerstone was laid in 1850.

James Renwick Jr., who had recently won a competition to design the Smithsonian Institution Building, was selected to design Trinity's new sanctuary. The Gothic Revival building, topped with two towers, was completed in 1851. During the Civil War, the church was used as a military hospital for Union soldiers. In the decades after the war, Washingtonians began moving to more desirable areas of the city, and attendance at Trinity decreased. Despite renovations and the addition of a parish hall in the 1890s, the church continued to decline and grew deeper into debt. The local diocese took over the property after World War I, and the church became a social service outreach center.

The property was sold in 1936, and after the church was stripped of valuable contents and building materials, it was demolished and replaced with a parking lot. The Frances Perkins Building, headquarters of the United States Department of Labor, now stands on the site.

== History ==
=== Founding ===
In April 1827, a group of local Episcopalians met at the District of Columbia City Hall to discuss the need for an additional parish in Washington, D.C. It was decided that worshippers were having to travel too far to either Christ Church in Capitol Hill or St. John's Episcopal Church on Lafayette Square. The following year a new church building was constructed on 5th Street NW between D and E Streets, facing City Hall in the English Hill neighborhood, present-day Judiciary Square. The new church, consecrated on May 11, 1829, was named Trinity, supposedly because it was the third Episcopal parish established in the nation's capital.

The neighborhood at that time was a mixture of modest houses for the working-class and stately Federal and Greek Revival townhouses for wealthier residents. The most notable building was City Hall, designed by George Hadfield, which was built in stages between 1820 and 1849. Among the prominent residents of the neighborhood was lawyer and author Francis Scott Key, who served as Trinity's senior warden. Other prominent attendees of the church around this time included former President John Quincy Adams, Vice President John C. Calhoun, Secretary of State Henry Clay, and Senator Daniel Webster. Trinity was often called the "church of the mayors" due to the number of local government officials, including mayors, that attended services.

=== New sanctuary ===
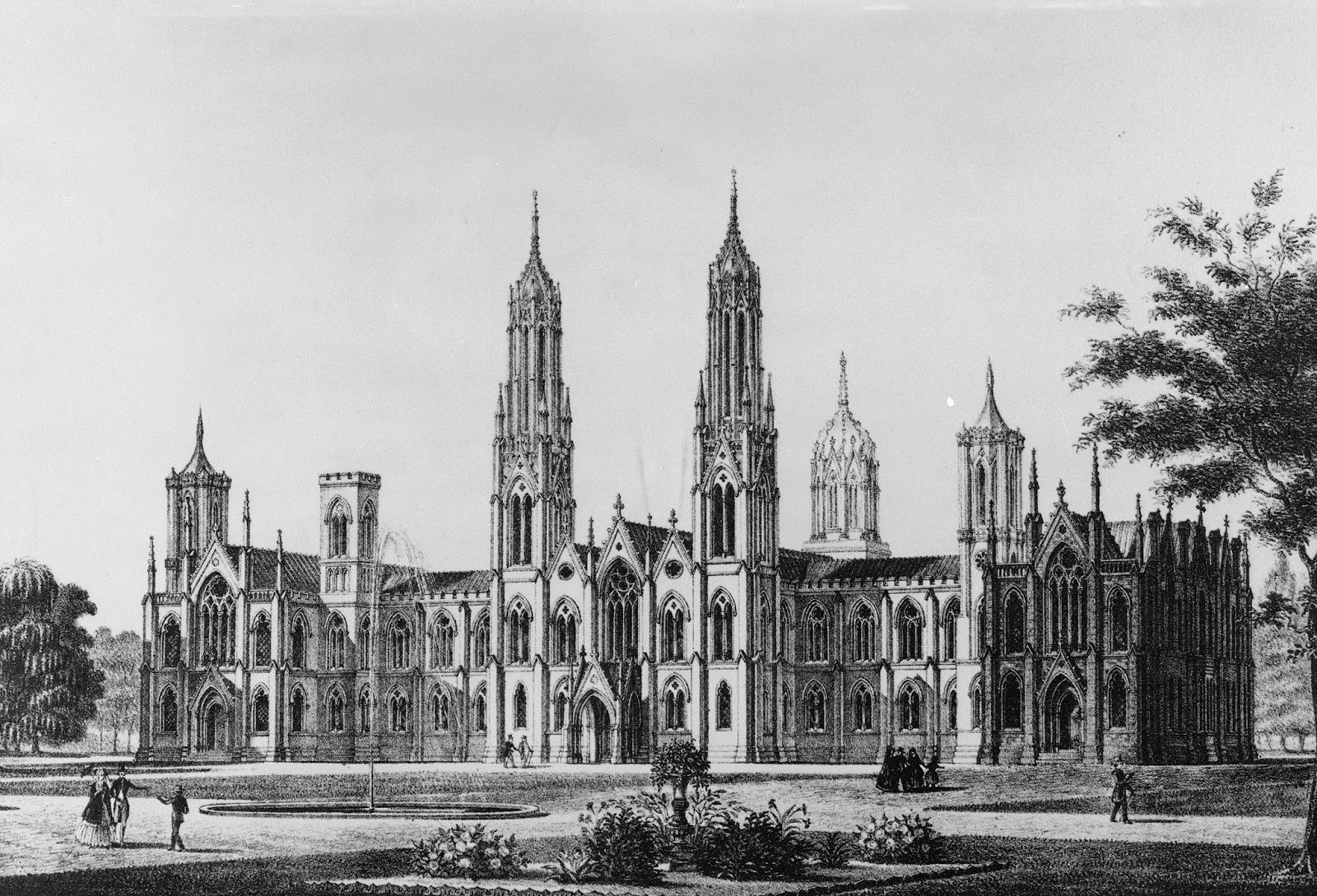
James Renwick Jr.'s unsuccessful design for the Smithsonian Institution Building was used in the design of Trinity Episcopal Church.

Attendance at Trinity grew until their building on 5th Street was no longer suitable. When Reverend Clement Moore Butler became rector in 1847, he led the push for a new and prominent building to be constructed for the parish. The original plan was to demolish the 5th Street building and replace it with a larger sanctuary. With the financial help of businessman and philanthropist William Wilson Corcoran, the parish could buy land south of City Hall on the northeast corner of 3rd and C Streets NW. Due to his financial assistance, Corcoran likely influenced the selection of one of his favorite architects, James Renwick Jr., to design the new building.

Renwick was an architect from New York whose first major commission was Grace Church in New York City, completed in 1846. Renwick had recently won a competition to design the Smithsonian Institution Building, also known as the Smithsonian Castle. He had submitted two designs, one an elaborate Gothic Revival building featuring spires and arches, and the second a Norman style castle. The latter was chosen, and Renwick's rejected entry, which Corcoran favored, was used as the base design for Trinity's new building. The building wings and some other features were removed in the final design for Trinity.

Renwick's Smithsonian Institution design and, thereby, Trinity's was inspired by the Perpendicular Gothic architectural style. Bent openwork wooden beams in the shape of bells were added to the top of each tower, resembling the one found on St Giles' Cathedral in Edinburgh, Scotland. Similar to Renwick's Grace Church, Trinity included many Gothic Revival features including elaborate tracery and pinnacles with fleur-de-lis. The square-shaped building had an octagonal nave with an octagonal cupola above it. The somewhat unusual shape of the church drew some complaints, with one newspaper commenter calling it "a stump-tailed steamboat" due to the flat roof and two towers, a result of Renwick's design for the Smithsonian originally being a free-standing building. Some features, including the openwork bell towers and pinnacles, were altered decades later.

The cornerstone for the new church was laid on April 2, 1850. On it was inscribed the year and Renwick's name, as well as that of the builder, Gilbert Cameron, and carpenter, John Sniffen. Work began on the construction of the church, made of red sandstone from Seneca, Maryland, and the nave was largely complete by July of that year when a storm damaged the Chesapeake and Ohio Canal, which was used to transport the sandstone into the city. Construction was delayed by a few months, and the church towers were completed in March 1851. To help fund the construction of the building, an auction was held for pew seating. Due to the auction's success, in which wealthy congregants bid for the best seats, more than $19,000 was raised. After the congregation moved to the new building in May 1851, the old sanctuary on 5th Street was bought by the First Congregational Church, which met there until 1858. It was later used as a stable before housing the Columbian Law School, now known as George Washington University Law School. After the school moved to a new location, it was used as an office building and later demolished in 1898.

=== Later history ===
During the Civil War, the allegiance of many members was to the Confederacy. The church's rector, Butler, who had previously served as Chaplain of the United States Senate, was from New York and loyal to the Union. The congregation created a hostile environment for him, leading to his resignation in 1861. The next rector, E.W. Syle, was loyal to the Confederacy. After a bishop told Syle he had to read a prayer supporting the Union, he refused and later resigned. The US government confiscated the building in 1862 for use as a military hospital, surprising congregants during a Sunday morning service when they heard supplies being unloaded in front of the church. Wooden planks were nailed onto the top of the pews to create hospital beds. The holes created by these nails were visible for the remainder of the building's history. The building continued in use as a hospital for ten months, and President Abraham Lincoln reportedly visited the site to visit wounded soldiers. After the Civil War, church attendance continued to grow and an addition was built in 1868.

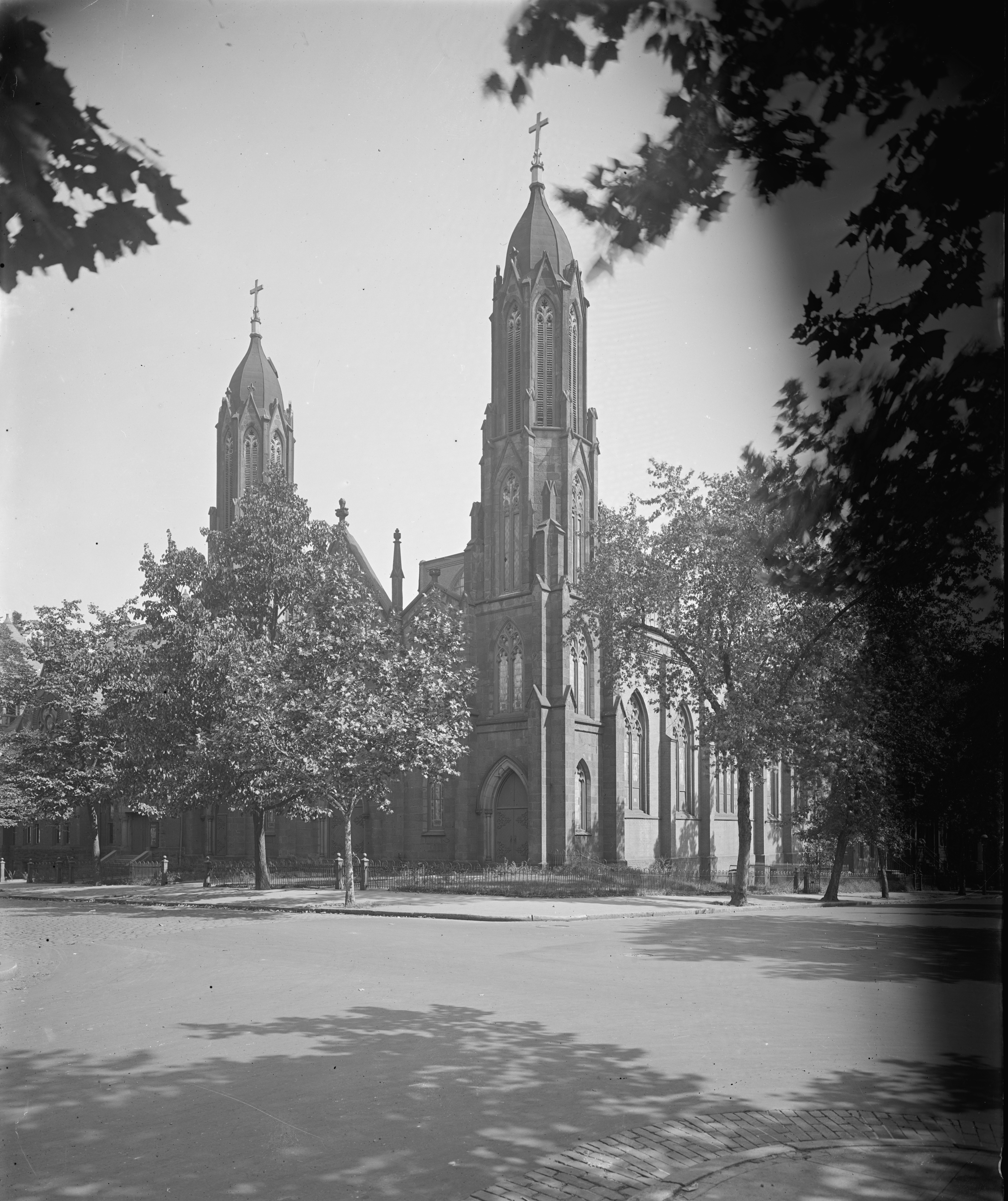
Trinity Episcopal Church sometime between 1918 and 1928

In the decades following the war, Washingtonians began moving to more fashionable areas of the city, leading to a decline in the neighborhood and church attendance. An article in the Evening Star in 1891 reported, "Trinity Church is a power in the city as an engine of good works, but owing to the growth of the city westward has lost somewhat of the stability and strength of its congregation which formerly characterized it." Nevertheless plans to add a large parish hall, which included a dining room for the congregation, was announced in 1893. The Evening Star stated, "an innovation in such structures will be a kitchen, a thing whose absence is nearly always missed at church suppers, and which will be a joy unspeakable to the ladies." Construction of the hall, designed by William J. Palmer, who would later design Ebenezer United Methodist Church, was completed in 1894 and almost took up the remaining land on the property. Sunday School meetings were moved from the basement into the new hall. A renovation from 1897–1898 included the addition of stained glass windows, a marble altar, a brass and marble pulpit, and mosaic floors. The carpets and pew seat cushions were also replaced.

Church attendance and the money from its wealthier congregants who had moved continued to decline in the early 1900s. The former stately houses in the neighborhood were increasingly home to "a floating population." Despite this, a 75th-anniversary celebration and formal consecration of the church was held in April 1902 and attended by Bishop Henry Y. Satterlee and other dignitaries. In 1903, the church was forced to ask that back taxes for its rectory be forgiven: "This church has lost heavily in wealth by the constant removal of parishioners to the northwest, where they have become attached to other parishes, and the income of this parish thereby being terribly impaired. The people whom we serve are now of a much poorer class than those to whom we ministered some years ago." Trinity became a charity center during World War I for soldiers stationed in the city. It continued this role after the war when the Episcopal Diocese of Washington dissolved the remaining congregation in 1921 and took full control of the property, which was deeply in debt. From that time on, the church building became an outreach center and housed social services for the area's poor residents. The Parish Hall was renamed the Trinity Community House and included a gymnasium, dining area, library, an emergency room, and a "mental hygiene clinic room." A 100th-anniversary celebration held in 1928, with Bishop James E. Freeman in attendance, was one of the last large events held at Trinity.

=== Demolition ===
Due to continued debts, the Diocese announced it would demolish the church and lease the 14,000-square-foot (1,300 m2) property to the Auto City Parking Company. The company would pay the Diocese $43,000 over ten years to use the land as a parking lot. Some of the previous church members were upset at the news. The Washington Post reported, "Many venerable parishioners have 'raised Cain,' to quote one church official, about the demolition of the old edifice. They've termed the destruction of the landmark 'sacrilege, heartless and commercial.' But a temple which doesn't pay must fall." One last church service at Trinity was held on June 16, 1936. Before demolition began three months later, some of the building's contents, including furniture and windows, were given to other local parishes. The demolition company sold the remaining contents and building parts, including sandstone blocks and roof slates. A family from Camp Springs, Maryland, purchased the cornerstone and other building materials for their new log cabin. Trinity was demolished among hundreds of buildings in the surrounding area between 1930 and 1980 and replaced with office and judicial buildings. The church's former site is now occupied by the Frances Perkins Building, headquarters of the United States Department of Labor.
