= US General Accounting Office Building =

- U.S. National Register of Historic Places
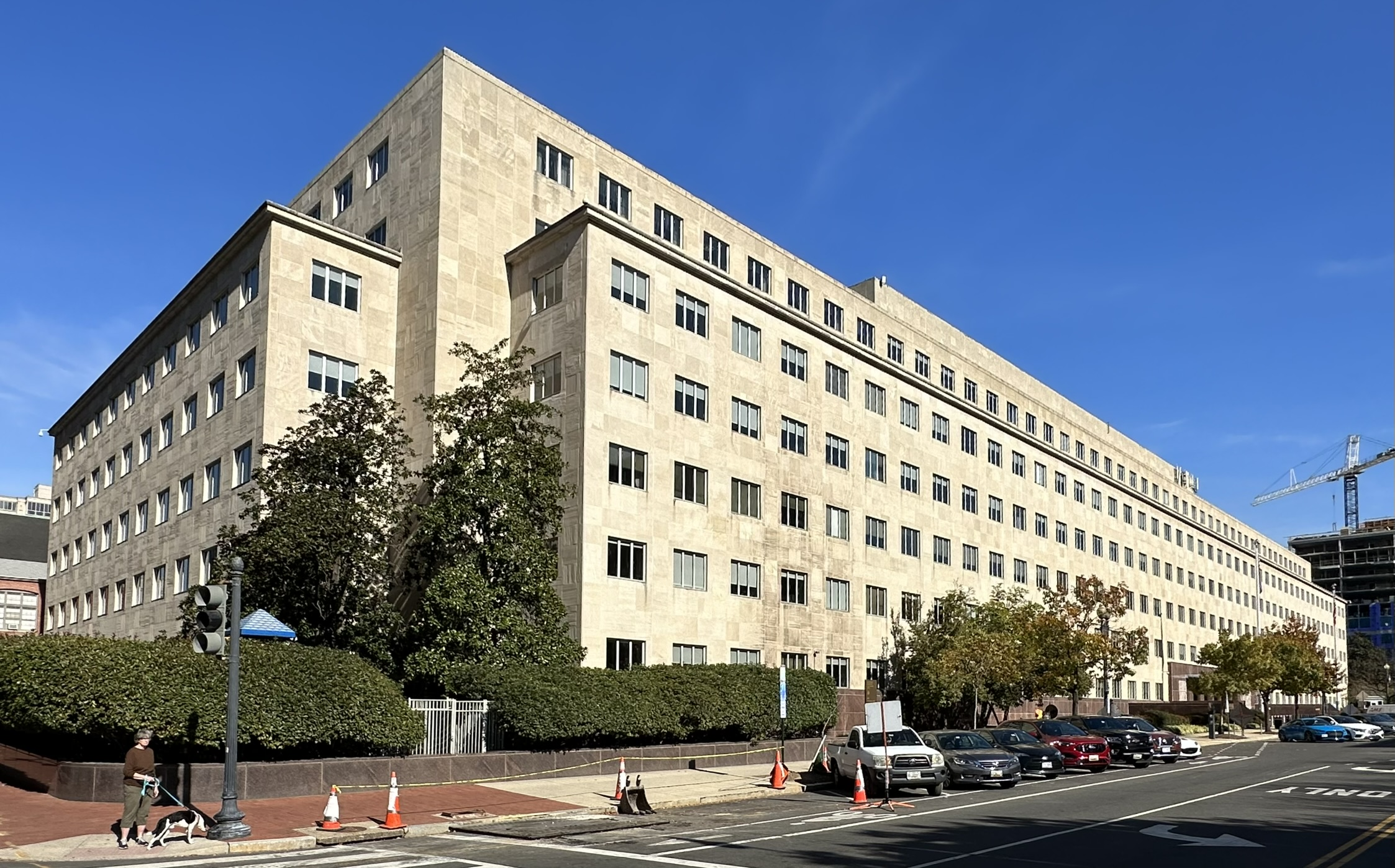
- U.S. Government Accountability Office Building in 2023

- Location within Central Washington, D.C. Location within the District of Columbia Location within the United States
- Location: 441 G Street NW Washington, D.C.
- Coordinates: 38°53′54.24″N 77°1′3″W
- Area: 5 acres (2.0 ha)
- Built: 1951
- Architectural style: Modern
- NRHP reference No.: 95001086
- Added to NRHP: September 21, 1995

The U.S. Government Accountability Office Building (the GAO Building -- formerly known as the General Accounting Office Building) is a historic government office building mainly serving as the headquarters of the Government Accountability Office, a legislative branch agency that provides auditing, evaluative, and investigative services for the United States Congress in an independent and nonpartisan capacity. Unlike most other federal government buildings it is directly owned and operated by the agency itself and is managed by EMCOR Government Services (Emcor / EMCOR Group) through a government contract, rather than the General Services Administration in order the prevent a conflict of interest with the executive branch agencies they audit; unlike other legislative branch agencies it is not operated by the Architect of the Capitol which manages the physical infrastructure for core buildings that are part of the United States Capitol Complex.

It is located at 441 G Street NW in Washington, D.C. 20226 in the Judiciary Square neighborhood, the building is adjacent to the National Building Museum.

Unique in its "block style" design, federal office buildings before central air conditioning were designed with interior courtyards and wings, to allow for maximum ventilation and light. While the initial 1941 design utilized a "fish bone" style, with a central spine and interior courtyards, WWII placed the project on hold while technology advanced.

In 1946, an updated, novel "solid building" design made headlines. Untested, planning officials wondered whether such a structure would prove claustrophobic for employees. It was dedicated on September 11, 1951, by President Harry S. Truman. The building also serves as headquarters for U.S. Army Corps of Engineers.

== See also ==
- National Register of Historic Places listings in central Washington, D.C.
