= Capitol Crossing =

Real estate development in Washington, D.C., U.S.

Coordinates: 38.898°N 77.014°W

Capitol Crossing is a $1.3 billion real estate development—often also referred to as a community revitalization project—built from 2014 to 2021 in downtown Washington, D.C.

The project stems from the 1960s construction of I-395, which divided the neighborhoods of Capitol Hill and the East End. Beginning in the 1980s, developers proposed various projects based on a freeway lid that would reconnect the communities. These efforts were dubbed "the I-395 air rights project". In 2012, the Property Group Partners development company acquired the air rights and the Federal Highway Administration approved the environmental assessment with a finding of no significant impact.

One of the city's largest private developments, the 2.2-million-square-foot project covers a 7-acre site above I-395. Three long blocks over the highway are spanned by five mixed-use buildings: 200 Massachusetts, 250 Massachusetts, 200 F Street, 600 Second, and 201 F Street. The project has space for 75,000 square feet of retail, restaurants, and cafes; it also has a 4-level garage with 1,146 parking spaces and 440 bicycle parking spaces.

Developers said Capitol Crossing would create 8,000 permanent jobs, contribute more than $40 million a year to city revenue, and create the city's first “eco-district”. The five buildings are expected to be certified LEED Platinum. 200 Massachusetts received the designation in 2018. The project is to feature cogeneration power, rainwater catchment, and eco-chimney filtration.

A $200 million freeway lid over I-395 next to Massachusetts Avenue will reconnect the long-divided neighborhoods of Capitol Hill and the East End. City officials said it would increase the vibrancy of the city's east-downtown neighborhoods.

The Office of the Deputy Mayor for Planning and Economic Development said the project would provide 150 residential units, including more than 50 affordable to most of the median income.

The project is owned and developed by Property Group Partners, with Skidmore, Owings & Merrill serving as master planners. The team also includes Roche-Dinkeloo as architect for the North Block (200/250 Massachusetts Ave) and Kohn Pedersen Fox Associates as architect for the South Block. Property Group Partners is the leasing agent.
