= Moran Building =

- U.S. National Register of Historic Places
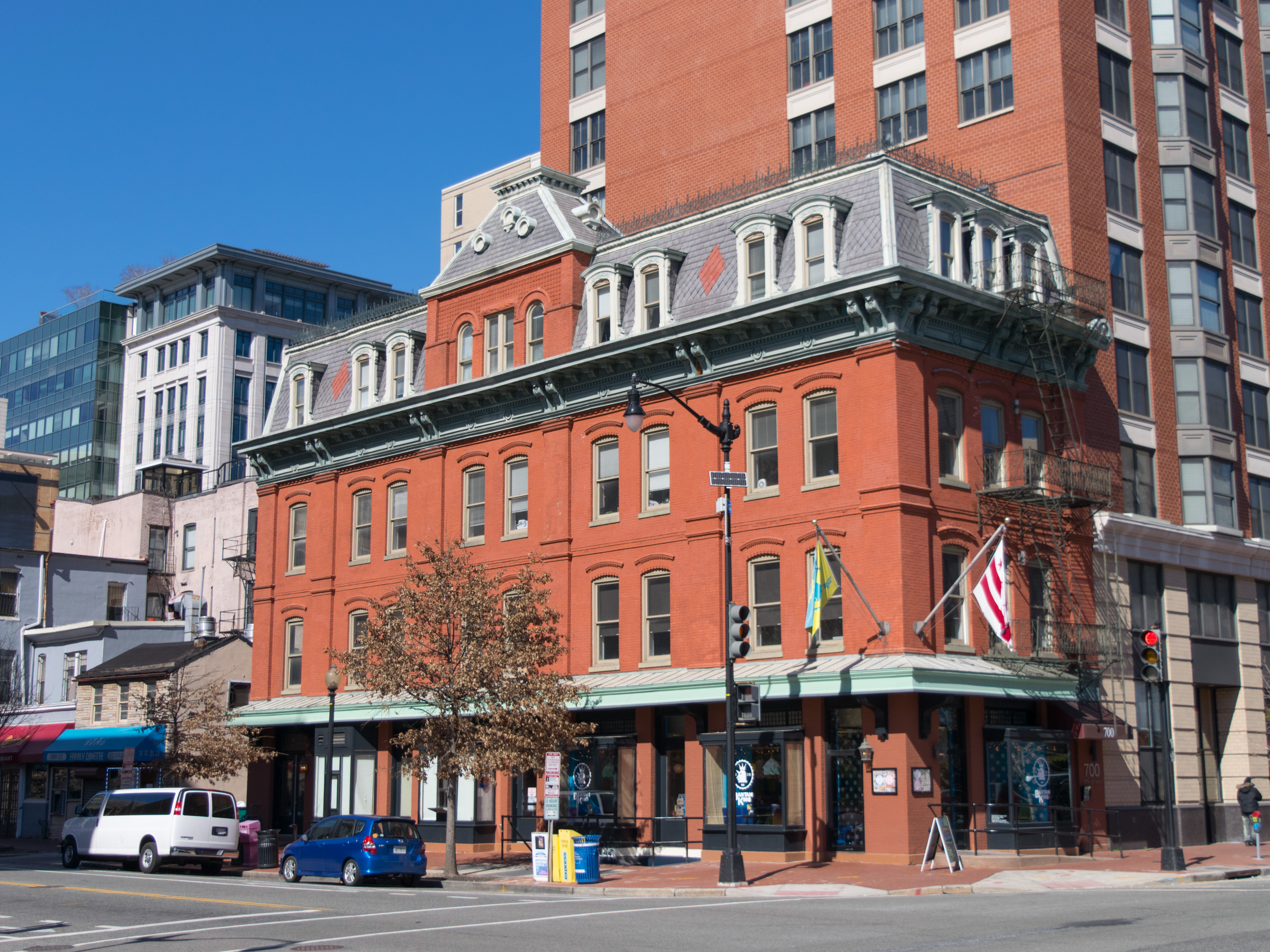
- Moran Building in 2017

- Location within Central Washington, D.C. Location within the District of Columbia Location within the United States
- Location: 501-509 G St., NW, Washington, District of Columbia
- Coordinates: 38°53′54″N 77°1′10″W
- Area: 0.4 acres (0.16 ha)
- Built: 1889
- Built by: Moran, J.E.
- Architectural style: Second Empire
- NRHP reference No.: 83001413
- Added to NRHP: September 26, 1983

The Moran Building is an historic Second Empire style building, located at 501-509 G Street, Northwest, Washington, D.C. It was listed on the National Register of Historic Places in 1983 for its architecture. The building was then vacant.

== History ==
It was built in 1889 by local builder J.E. Moran. Its NRHP nomination describes it as "a distinctive commercial office building designed with exceptional verve in the Second Empire style and it is one of the last remaining commercial office buildings in that style in Washington. This small vernacular building architecturally expresses the prevading spirit of expansive optimism in both Washington and the Nation in the 1880s."

It served historically as a meeting hall, as a restaurant, as a specialty store, and as a business.
