= Harrison Apartment Building =

- U.S. National Register of Historic Places
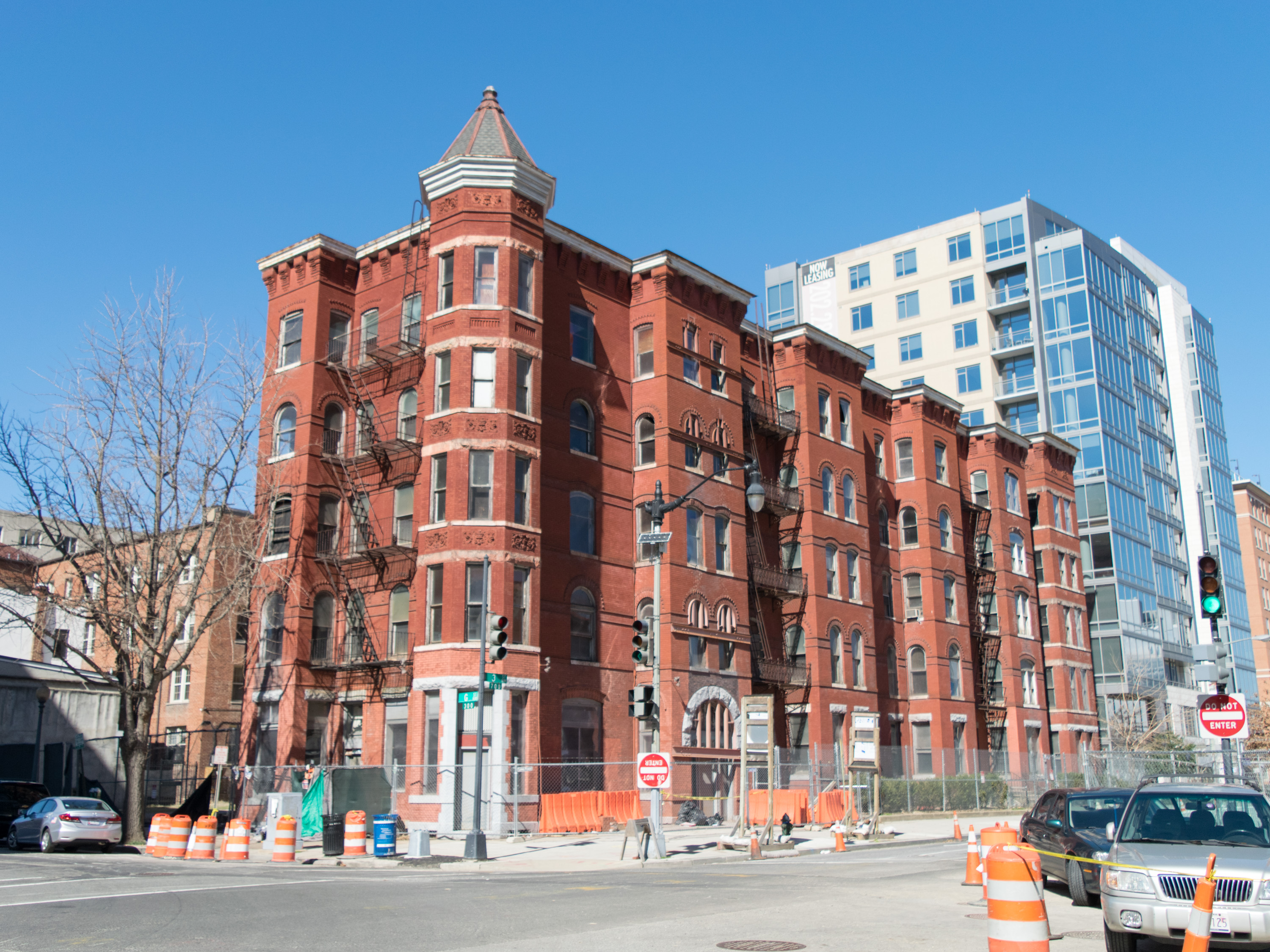

- Location within Washington, D.C.
- Location: 704 3rd Street, NW; Washington, D.C.
- Coordinates: 38°53′55″N 77°0′56″W
- Built: 1888
- Architect: Johnson and Company
- Architectural style: Late Victorian
- MPS: Apartment Buildings in Washington, DC, MPS
- NRHP reference No.: 94001036
- Added to NRHP: September 7, 1994

Harrison Apartment Building is an historic structure located in the Chinatown neighborhood of Washington, D.C. The building is the oldest known surviving conventional apartment building in the city.

== Background ==
The architectural firm of Johnson and Company designed the building with a Romanesque Revival façade. It features rhythmic bays that facilitate increased light and air circulation. It was listed on the National Register of Historic Places in 1994.

== Gallery ==
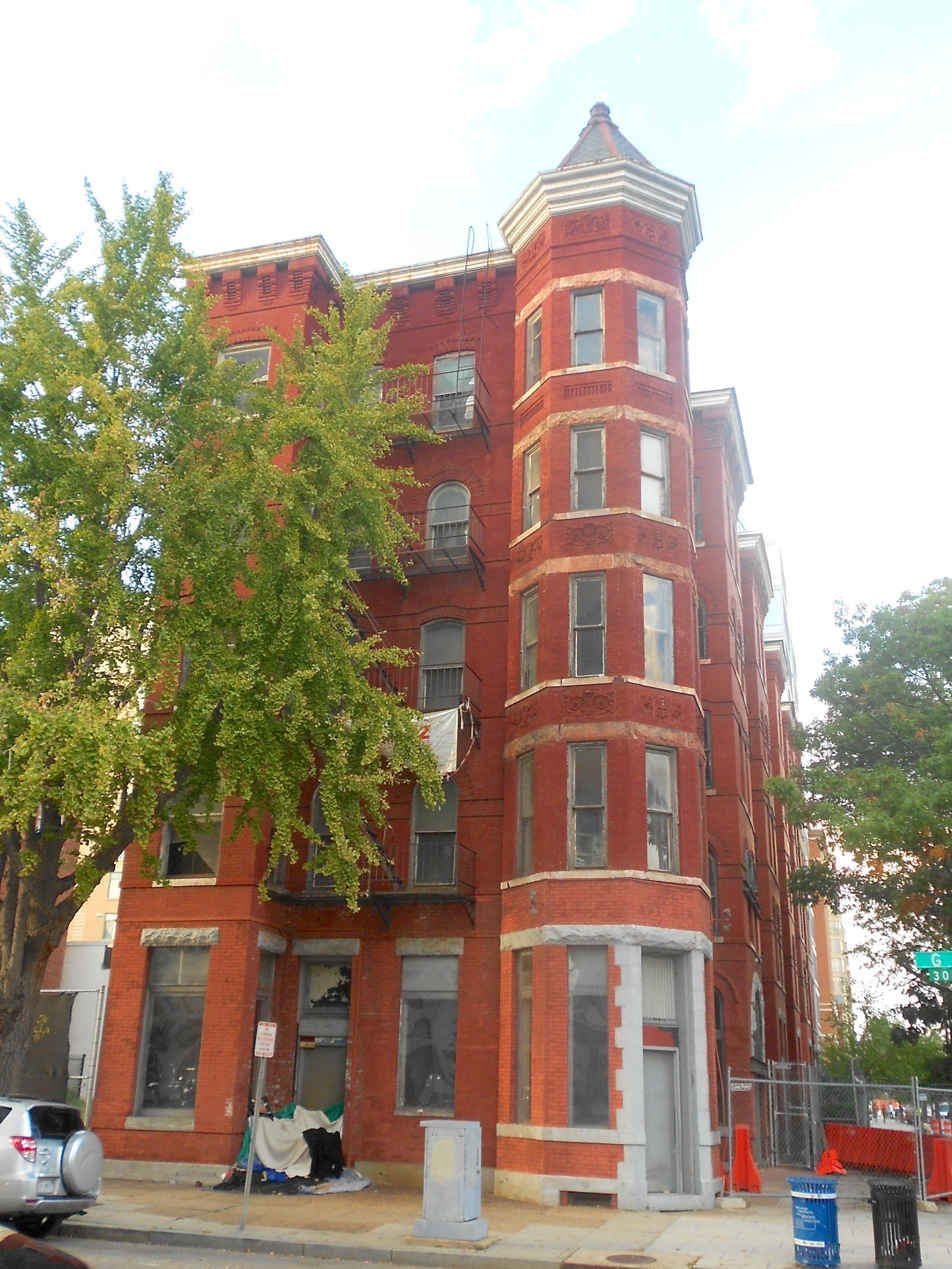
In 2008

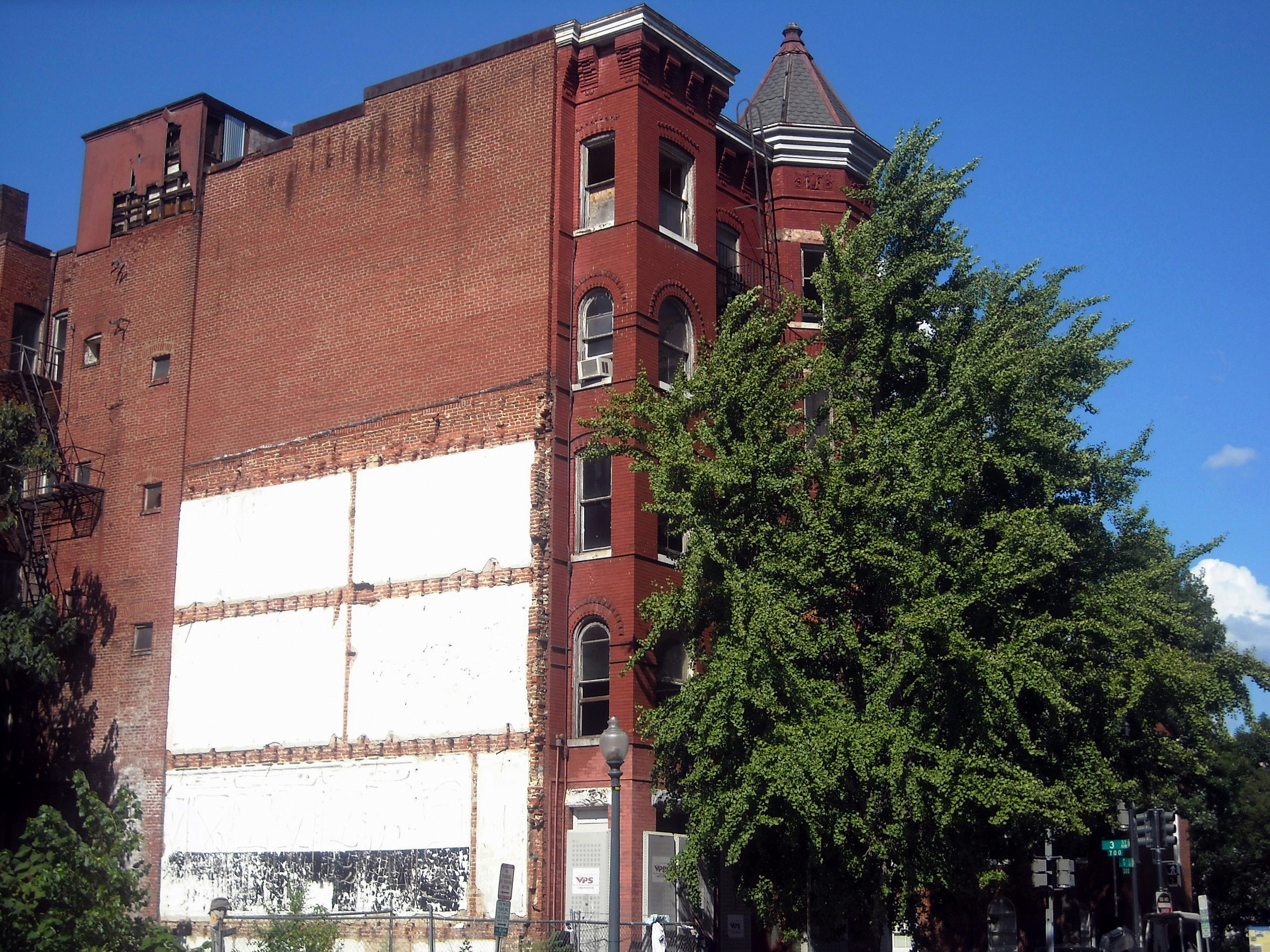
West side of building

== See also ==
- National Register of Historic Places listings in central Washington, D.C.
