= H. Carl Moultrie Courthouse =

Courthouse in Washington D.C, US

Coordinates: 38°53′39.1″N 77°1′8.3″W

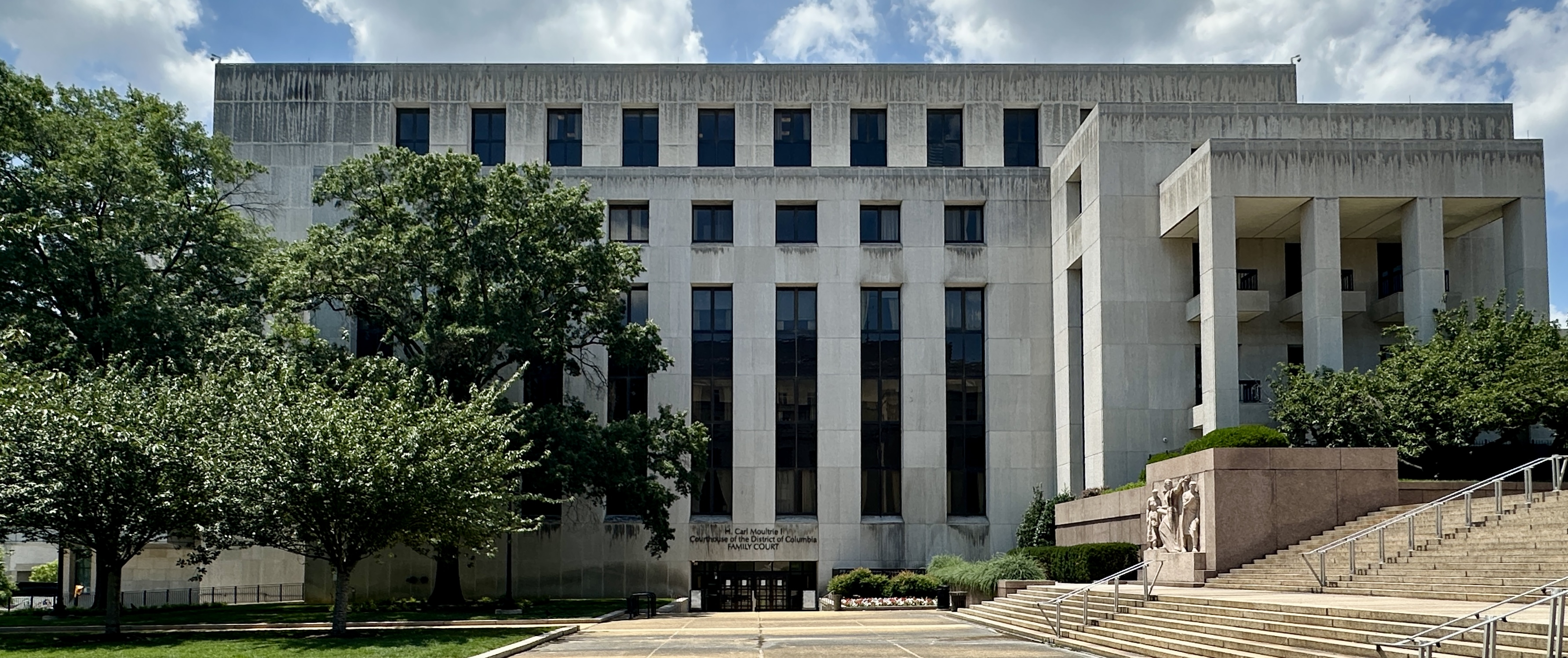
- H. Carl Moultrie Courthouse in 2026
- Former names: District of Columbia Courthouse

General information
- Location: 500 Indiana Avenue, NW, Washington, D.C., U.S.
- Current tenants: Superior Court of the District of Columbia
- Construction started: 1975
- Completed: 1976

Height
- Height: 36.58 metres (120.0 ft)

Technical details
- Floor count: 8

Design and construction
- Architecture firm: Hellmuth, Obata & Kassabaum

Website
- http://www.dccourts.gov/

The H. Carl Moultrie Courthouse is a courthouse of the Superior Court of the District of Columbia located at 500 Indiana Avenue NW, in the Judiciary Square neighborhood of Washington, D.C., United States.

== History ==
It was named after former Chief Judge H. Carl Moultrie I. Judge Moultrie was appointed an associate judge in 1972 and chief judge on June 22, 1978. He remained chief judge until he died on April 9, 1986.

In August 1978, heavy rain resulted in a roof leak because the roof drains could not handle the volume of rainwater.
