= E. Barrett Prettyman United States Courthouse =

- U.S. District Courthouse - District of Columbia
- U.S. National Register of Historic Places
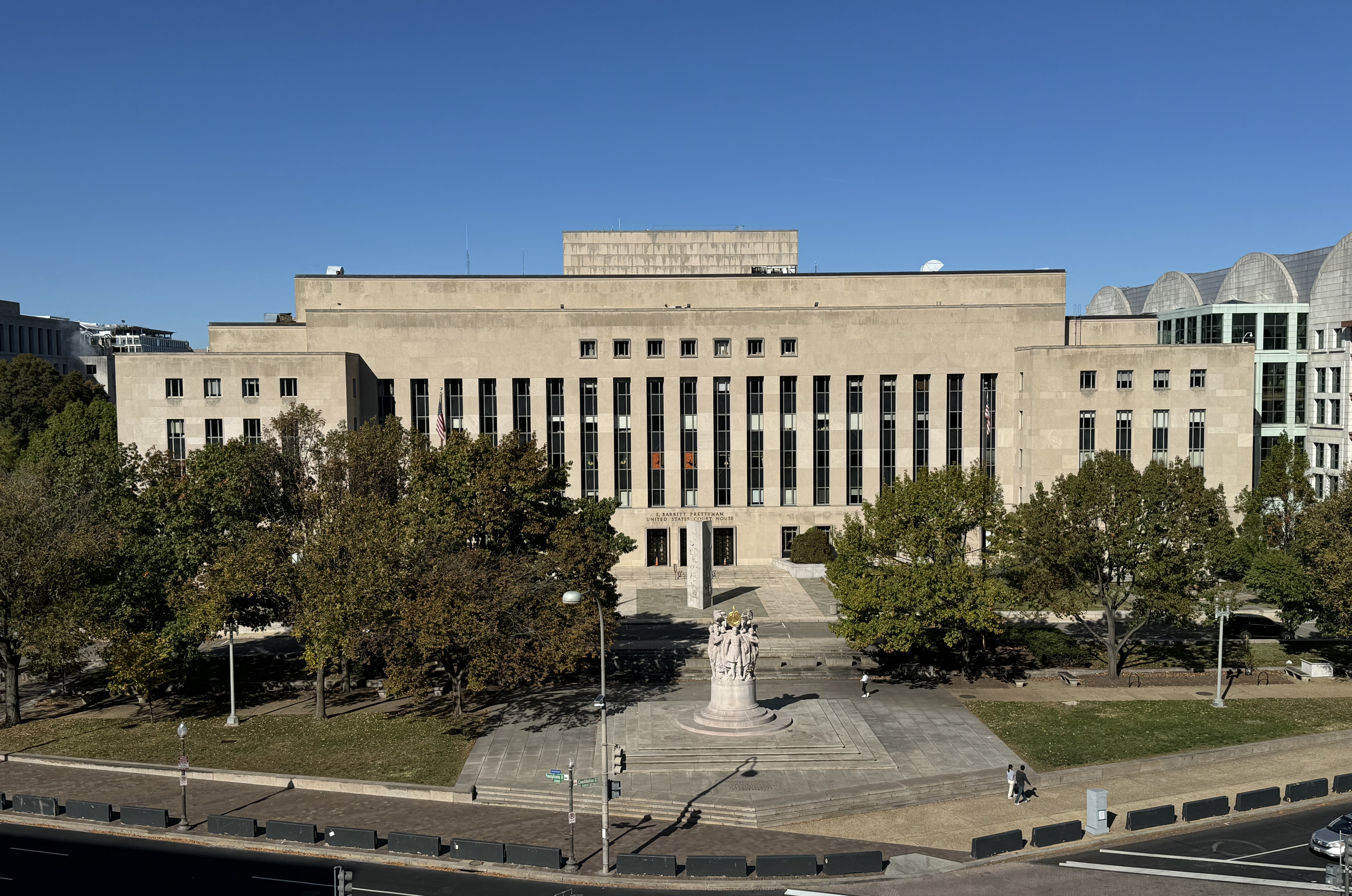
- E. Barrett Prettyman United States Courthouse in Washington, D.C.

- Location within Central Washington, D.C.
- Location: 333 Constitution Avenue N.W., Washington, D.C., U.S.
- Coordinates: 38°53′35″N 77°00′59″W
- Built: 1949; 77 years ago
- Architect: Louis Justement
- Architectural style: Stripped Classical
- NRHP reference No.: 07000640
- Added to NRHP: July 5, 2007

The E. Barrett Prettyman Federal Courthouse is a federal courthouse in Washington, D.C. that is home to the U.S. District Court for the District of Columbia and the U.S. Court of Appeals for the District of Columbia Circuit. Since 2009, it has also been the meeting location for the United States Foreign Intelligence Surveillance Court.

The Prettyman Courthouse is located on Constitution Avenue in the Judiciary Square neighborhood of Washington, across from the East Building of the National Gallery of Art. It opened in 1952 and was expanded with an annex in 2004.

== Significance ==
The Prettyman Courthouse is one of the last buildings constructed in the Judiciary Square and Municipal Center complex, an important civic enclave since the 1820s. It constitutes an almost entirely unaltered example of early 1950s Stripped Classicism, a non-representational abstraction of the classical style that permeated institutional (especially government) architecture after the Second World War. President Harry S. Truman laid the cornerstone on June 27, 1950, and the building opened in November 1952. It was listed by the National Register of Historic Places and is a contributing property to the Pennsylvania Avenue National Historic Site. It was renamed in 1997 in honor of E. Barrett Prettyman, the former Chief Judge of the U.S. Court of Appeals for the District of Columbia Circuit.

== Architectural description ==
The courthouse was built on Reservation 10, a site bounded by Constitution Avenue, Third Street, C Street and John Marshall Place. The building faces south across Constitution Avenue towards the Mall, and was erected on the northwest quadrant of its site. This placement accommodated driveways along the south and west facades, and along with the subsequent plazas and landscaping, provided a buffer between the colonnades of the E. Barrett Prettyman Federal Courthouse and the verdant Mall, onto which it opened before I.M Pei's 1970 addition to the National Gallery.

With construction starting in 1949, the E. Barrett Prettyman Federal Courthouse was the last addition to a neighborhood of important civic and municipal structures. Known as the Municipal Center, this neighborhood's history of civic activity dates to the 1820 completion of George Hadfield's Old City Hall. In 1932, a formal plan for a Municipal Center, bounded by Constitution Avenue and G Street between 3rd and 6th streets, was designed. By 1934, municipal, police, and juvenile courts had been built on the site; however, the current site of the E. Barrett Prettyman Federal Courthouse was left vacant due to budgetary concerns. The site was used as a parking lot until 1949 when construction on the E. Barrett Prettyman Federal Courthouse commenced on the southeastern corner of the Municipal Center site.

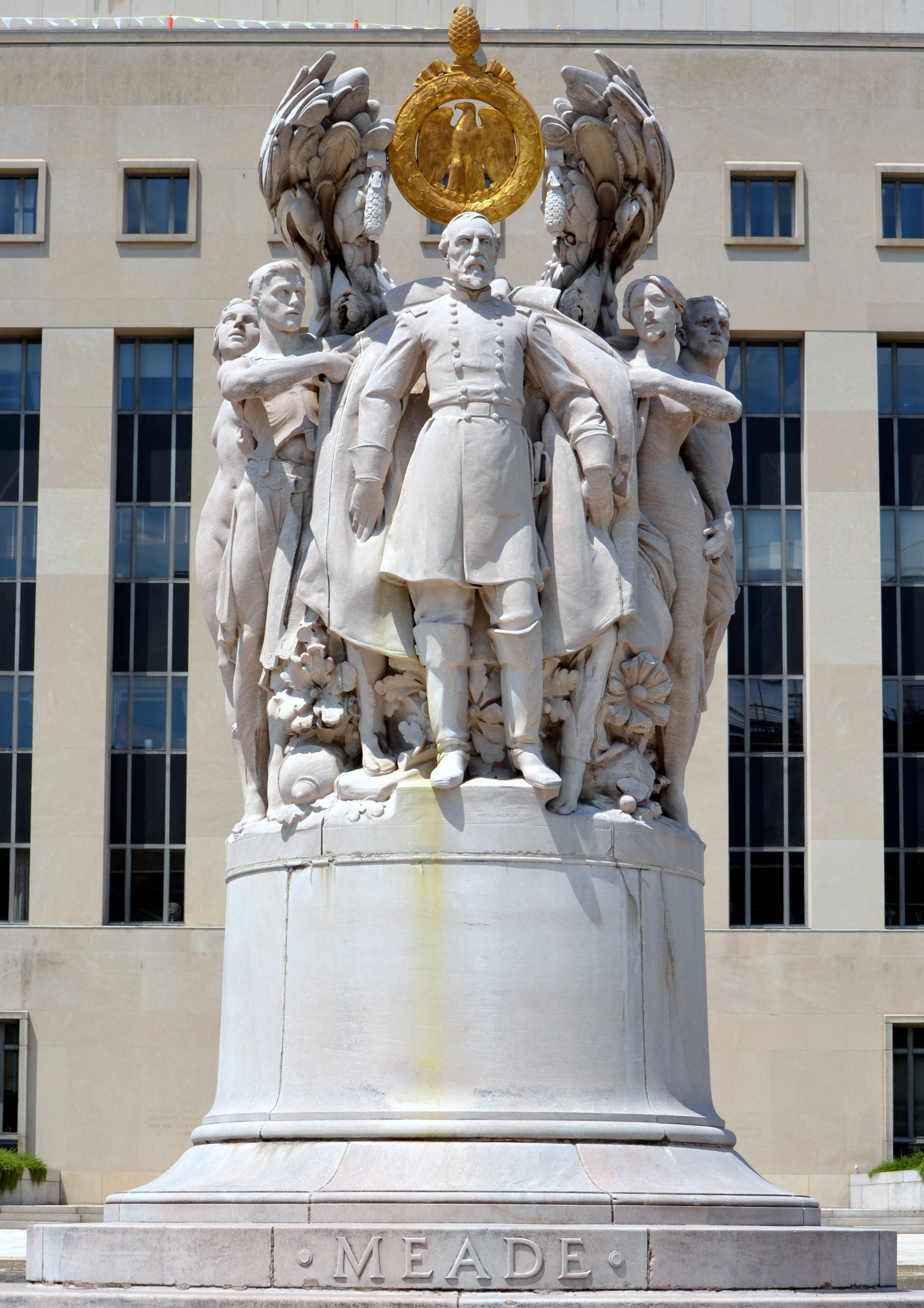
The George Gordon Meade Memorial located at the south front

While composing the building's exterior, Louis Justement, the architect, employed the grand scale and urban presence of pre-war federal architecture, but relied on "simplicity and architectural expression based on adaptation to functions". The building's H-plan was generally composed of an eight-floor rectangular block that intersected two perpendicular six-story wings on the east and west elevations. These secondary pavilions projected forty feet beyond the main building envelope to the north and south, and provided 20-foot setbacks at the sixth floor. A repetitive vertical fenestration pattern classically organized according to base, body, and attic, with recessed aluminum windows surmounted by Virginia serpentine spandrels, unified the main block with its flanking elements. Juxtaposition between the building's dark attenuated verticals with the light, planar mass of its limestone walls also alluded to the traditional colonnades seen in the Municipal Center buildings of Harris and Wyeth, Cret's Folger Shakespeare library of 1928-32 and even to Justement's own architecture of the 1920s and 30s. (Note that Justement used no pediments, entablatures, or porticoes, as seen in the Municipal Center, Judiciary Square and Federal Triangle Buildings.) These traditional references were further enhanced by the incised flute-like lines of the window returns, and the building's tripartite organization. The base (first floor) used floor-to-ceiling openings for both windows and doors. A projecting granite frame defined these voids and separated the lower portion from the piers above. The rigorous colonnade then marched across floors 2-4 on the side pavilions and floors 2-5 of the central block. Smaller square windows on the fifth floor of the side wings and the sixth floor of the central block defined the attic floor of the classically organized facade.

Although the E. Barrett Prettyman Federal Courthouse exterior showed strong classical influences in its fundamental geometric articulation, its facades also reveal interest in the modern aesthetic. The facade composition relied on the juxtaposition of dark attenuated verticals with light, planar sheets of limestone. This architectural reliance on the subtle (light, shadow, and richness of material) indirectly responded to the increasing popularity of Modernism. One contemporary writer labeled the building "a rather conservative version of modern architecture. . . in order not the conflict with the traditional architecture of the other buildings on the Federal Triangle." Chief Justice Harold M. Stephens' comment recounted a fundamental element of modernism: "We wanted the building to be functional, not monumental." As a dual classical/modern expression, the building remains a period work, and evidences the federal government's search for new architectural identities in the wake of the Great Depression and the Second World War.

Formally, the building's massing and articulation responded to an established government style, the stripped classical. This style was promoted chiefly through the work of Paul Philippe Cret, who sat on numerous local, national, and international architectural juries, held a 34-year tenure at the University of Pennsylvania and served as a member of the tenets of European modernism, but married them with a traditional and classical design vocabulary. Through its symmetrical mass, attenuated verticals and vaguely cubist sculptural element, the E. Barrett Prettyman Federal Courthouse recalls the work of Cret, Wyeth, and U.S. Supervising Architect of the Treasury, Louis A. Simon. Justement arranged the building's interior spaces in such a way that the building would "not only provide adequate quarters for the efficient operation of the Circuit and District Courts and their allied activities for a number of years to come, but would also provide for the convenience and comfort of the judges, attorneys, jurors, witnesses and others who will be required to use the building." These diverse functions mandated innovative programmatic solutions. To give adequate security and segregate public from private spaces, Justement adopted a unique network of primary and secondary circulation, with five distinct transportation cores and a series of main hallways flanked by ancillary circulation spaces. Justement placed the two courts on separate floors to isolate and separate their functions from one another. The District Court occupied most of the floors: two, four and six. The Court of Appeals, which did not require jury deliberation space to as many courtrooms, occupied floors three and five.

The first six floors of the E. Barrett Prettyman Federal Courthouse were similar in plan. Four elevators opened into a small lobby that accessed the main, double-loaded east-west corridor. The main hallway traveled nearly the entire width of the building and intersected secondary corridors at each end. The secondary corridors, which traveled north-south, provided access to the office spaces. On floors two, four, five, and six, the secondary corridors also connected to guarded entrances, which controlled access to private judges' corridors. The length of the secondary corridors varied by floor. Courtrooms, however, appeared in set locations. Floors two and four each held seven courtrooms. The courtrooms on the second floor feature recycled mahogany wood, including pieces from the last Supreme Court renovation that began in 2003. The wood makes up the general public seating pews as well as the wall panels. The north side of the main corridors on each floor accessed six courtrooms, while the seventh was accessed from the south side of the corridors. The sixth floor followed an identical arrangement, but held only six courtrooms. The ceremonial courtroom occupied the space of two typical courtrooms.

Aside from the separation of the District and Appeals Courts, a hierarchical and segregated plan was essential to ensure the security and privacy of all trial participants. Justement's design had to prevent chance encounters between jurors, lawyers, judges and the public. To do so, he enclosed all courtrooms within a perimeter of office spaces and corridors, limiting external stimuli, such as light and noise. Moreover, three distinct circulation networks guaranteed that prisoners, judges, lawyers and jurors would interact only in the controlled environment of the courtroom. This arrangement forced Justement to literally wrap, both vertically and horizontally, his circulation matrices around each courtroom.

Not only did Justement's plan create separate zones of circulation, but it also incorporated separate spaces devoted to the various trial participants, placing all court activities under one roof. The courthouse had designated facilities for courtrooms, judges, jurors, witnesses, prisoners, and lawyers. For instance, judges and their clerks were ensconced in chambers located conveniently near each judge's courtroom, while lawyers congregated in a conference room adjacent to the courtroom floor. Jurors waited in a large, private lounge and were often sequestered in dormitory rooms on the Courthouse's 7th and 8th floors. Even the media had a press room, with booths for transcribing notes. Furthermore, public telephones were placed on every floor.

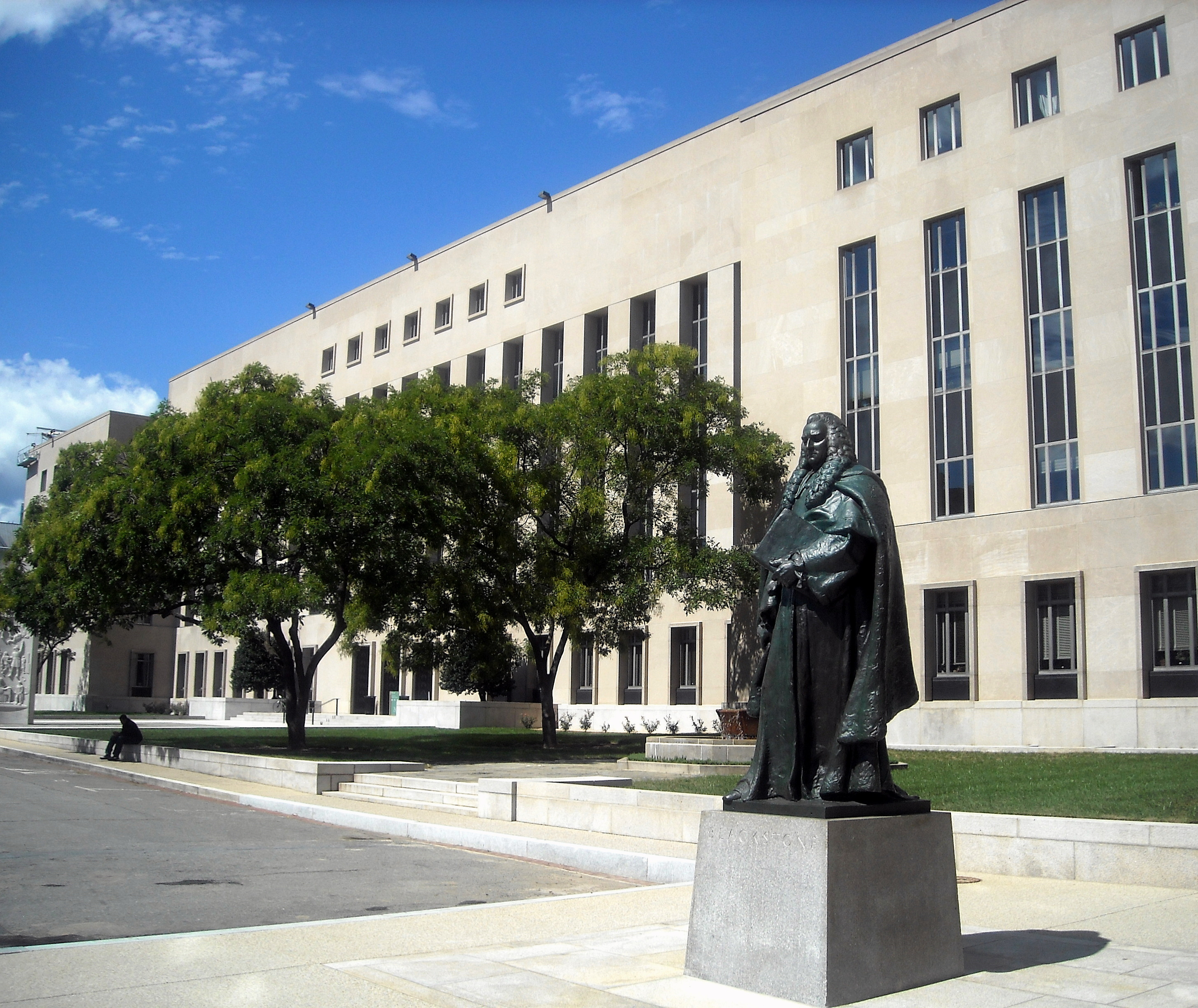
Statue of Sir William Blackstone located at the south front

The building had three main first-floor pedestrian entrances, located on the south, east, and west elevations. A secondary employee entrance and a prisoner entrance were located on the north elevation. All four entrances directly accessed the first floor's main east-west corridor. The following list describes the spaces originally contained on each floor.

- Basement: The basement housed a kitchen, cafeteria, prisoner holding cells, custodial offices, locker rooms, parking garage, pistol range, and mechanical spaces.
- First Floor: The west half of this floor was reserved for the U.S. Marshal's offices, the Probation Officer, the U.S. Commissioner and the Superintendent of the building. The east half of the floor was reserved for the Clerk of the District Court, the Health Unit and the Register of Wills. (No courtrooms originally existed on this floor).
- Second Floor: The second floor contained seven District Courtrooms, including adjacent judges' chambers, as well as the Domestic Relations Commissioner, the Veterans' Commissioner, the Commission on Mental Health and the Referee of Bankruptcy, all of which were District Court functions.
- Third Floor: The offices of the U.S. Attorney occupied the west, south, and east sides of the third floor. The Library of the District of Columbia Bar Association and the offices of the Assignment Commissioner of the District Court, were located on the north edge of this floor. Two Grand Jury Rooms appeared on the southern edge of the main east-west corridor. (No courtrooms appeared on this floor).
- Fourth Floor: This floor held seven courtrooms, and associated judges' chambers, prisoners' holding cells and jury rooms. It also contained separate lounges for jurors, witnesses and lawyers. A Press Room, 13 three-room court reporter suites and offices for the Court Auditor and Jury Commissioner were also located on this floor.
- Fifth Floor: This entire floor was devoted to the Court of Appeals. It contained a single courtroom, nine judges' chambers, and two smaller retired judges' chambers, two conference rooms, offices for the Clerk of the Court of Appeals and the Marshal of the Court of Appeals. The fifth floor held a second law library, which was shared by both the District and Appeals Courts.
- Sixth Floor: The sixth floor had six courtrooms, one of which was a double wide ceremonial courtroom. This floor additionally had associated judges' chambers, jury rooms, the judges' dining room and the District Court Committee on Admissions and Grievances.
- Seventh and Eighth Floors: These floors contained jury sequestration rooms and spaces for mechanical equipment.
