= Senator Marshall =

Senator Marshall may refer to:

== Members of the United States Senate ==
- Humphrey Marshall (politician) (1760–1841), U.S. Senator from Kentucky from 1795 to 1801
- Roger Marshall (born 1960), U.S. Senator from Kansas since 2021

== United States state senate members ==
- Alexander J. Marshall (1803–1882), Virginia State Senate
- Bob Marshall (Kansas politician) (born 1937, Kansas State Senate
- Elaine Marshall (born 1945), North Carolina State Senate
- Henry Marshall (New York politician) (1847–1938), New York State Senate
- Henry Marshall (Louisiana politician) (1805–1864), Louisiana State Senate
- James Keith Marshall (1817–1862), Virginia State Senate
- James William Marshall (politician) (1844–1911), Virginia State Senate
- L. L. Marshall (1888–1958), Ohio State Senate
- Leroy T. Marshall (1883–1950), Ohio State Senate
- N. Monroe Marshall (1854–1935), New York State Senate
- Oliver S. Marshall (1850–1934), West Virginia State Senate
- Robert I. Marshall (1946–2024), Delaware State Senate
- Thomas Marshall (Illinois politician) (1817–1873), Illinois State Senate
- Thomas Marshall (Maine politician) (1826–1861), Maine State Senate
- Thomas F. Marshall (North Dakota politician) (1854–1921), North Dakota State Senate
