= Alexander J. Marshall =

American politician

Alexander John Marshall

Member of the Virginia Senate from the Fauquier and Rappahannock Counties district
- In office December 1862 – March 15, 1865
- Preceded by: James K. Marshall
- Succeeded by: Philip W. Strother

Personal details
- Born: February 21, 1803 Warrenton, Virginia, US
- Died: February 24, 1882 (aged 79) Baltimore, Maryland, US
- Spouse(s): Maria Rose Taylor; Ann Elizabeth Robb
- Children: Charles Marshall
- Education: Harvard University

Alexander John Marshall (February 21, 1803 – February 24, 1882) was a Virginia lawyer, businessman and politician who served many years as Clerk of Fauquier County, helped secure construction of the Rappahannock Canal, and was a Virginia state senator during the American Civil War (1862–1865).

== Early life ==
The son of Charles Fleming Marshall and his wife, the former Lucy Pickett (both families being among the First Families of Virginia), Alexander J. Marshall was born in Fauquier County, Virginia. A grandson of Revolutionary War patriot Thomas Marshall, he was a cousin of Chief Justice John Marshall (many of whose sons likewise became lawyers).

In 1827, Marshall married Maria Rose Taylor (1808–1844). Their children who survived to adulthood included Charles Marshall (1830–1902), Catherine Taylor Marshall (1832–1866) and Lily Marshall Green (1837–1919). After her death, Marshall remarried on November 5, 1845 to Ann E. Robb (1824–1907), and they had daughters Lucy (1855–after 1907) and Agnes Marshall Chew (1859–after 1907).

== Career ==
Marshall gave up his private legal practice in 1832 upon being elected Fauquier County clerk, one of three elected positions in every Virginia county. He was re-elected many times until leaving the office in 1846. In December 1843, Mashall supported Martin Brooke, who made various charges against former delegate and later Fauquier County Circuit Judge John Scott, father of Fauquier's multi-term delegate Robert Eden Scott.

From his home in Warrenton, Marshall also promoted the Rappahannock Canal which in the 1830s was planned to extend from Barnett's Mill in Culpeper County downstream to Fredericksburg, the first (or last) navigable port at the fall line of the Rappahannock River, which drains into the Potomac River and ultimately Chesapeake Bay. The canal into Virginia's Piedmont Region had been planned since circa 1811, and received further support when the United States Mine and other mining companies established gold, quartz and other mines near the Rappahannock and Rapidan Rivers in the 1830s.

The canal consisted of a series of concrete and stone locks and gates enclosing ponds which bypassed the non-navigable sections of the Rappahannock river. Thus, the canal supplemented (and often ran nearly parallel to) the Rappahannock. Although parts of the project had begun at the Fredericksburg end by 1829, that had fallen into disrepair before further construction began in earnest in November 1847, The canal allowed farmers' produce from Fauquier, Culpeper and Rappahaannock Counties access to the markets in Fredericksburg (with ready links to Richmond, Washington D.C. and Baltimore, Maryland), as well as allowed imported or manufactured goods to travel upstream more cheaply than by wagon teams.

Isham Keith and John Baker were prominent investors and the Virginia General Assembly granted a $100,000 loan to finish the canal in 1848. It officially opened in late November 1848, as three boats—the "A.J. Marshall", "Zachary Taylor" and "Lewis Cass"—arrived in Fredericksburg. On its first day of operations, the "Lewis Cass" returned with plaster to Kelly's Mill later in the day. This Marshall was its president by the 1850s. By the end of 1849, the Canal was complete through Fauquier County about 13 miles upstream of Warrenton, to Carter's Run The canal would have 20 dams, most accompanied by one or more lift-locks (usually of stone and primarily designed to minimize flooding which could destroy the canal, although they also lifted or lowered boats). The canal's final length was about 50 miles; the locks' maximum boat width was 9 foot 9 inches.

Two years later, money was sought to complete a tow path (previously boatmen on bateaux poled their craft through the ponds to the locks), but gross receipts had barely sufficed to keep the Canal navigable, even though no dividends had been paid to shareholders. When the Orange and Alexandria Railroad began operation, followed in 1852 by completion of his cousin Edward Carrington Marshall's Manassas Gap Railroad to The Plains in Fauquier County, both far undercut canal shipping prices. The canal business ended after about four years of operations with Alexander Marshall as its president, although Major Chancellor leased it 1855-57.

== American Civil War ==
Marshall's son, Charles Marshall, a lawyer who had moved to Baltimore, Maryland, returned to Virginia as the American Civil War began, in order to serve as an aide to General Robert E. Lee beginning in 1862. Late in the year, Marshall's cousin, James Keith Marshall, died. Alexander John Marshall assumed his seat in the Virginia Senate and represented Fauquier and Rappahannock Counties part-time til the war's end. His vote totals may have been boosted by distributing chapters of his Book for the Times with a fight-to-the-end theme. Meanwhile, the canal became a strategic feature in various conflicts near Fredericksburg, including the Battle of Fredericksburg in December 1862, and Captain John S. Mosby received considerable support from this area, including in 1864 recuperating from wounds near Carter's Run before his men evacuated him southward into Amherst County.

== Death and legacy ==
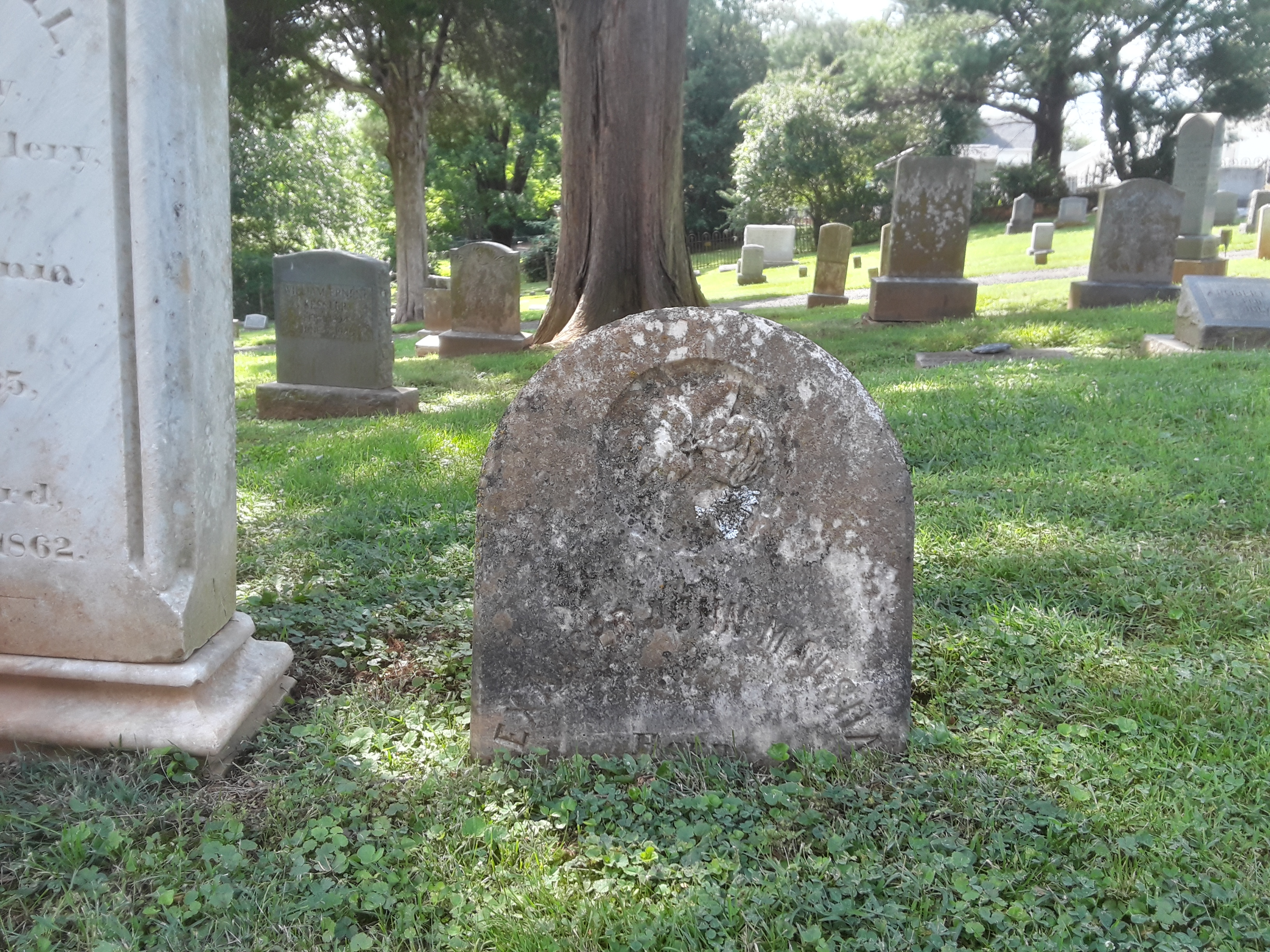
Marshall's grave in the Warrenton Cemetery

After the war ended, the Rappahannock canal was sold in 1868 to Dr. W.S. Scott for $1500 after being publicly called a "venerable, and now valueless improvement". Alexander Marshall moved to Baltimore, where he characterized himself on a census as a "retired merchant". He died in Baltimore on February 21, 1882, survived by his second wife, son and daughters. His remains were returned to Warrenton Cemetery and buried beside his first wife.

The Fredericksburg Water Power Company purchased the Rappahannock Canal's assets at some time after the Civil War, seeking to help bring water-powered industry to the city (like in Lowell, Massachusetts), but later the canal became one of the intakes for the city's drinking water filtration plant. The canal was briefly opened in 1901 to convey granite into Fredericksburg, and effectively drained in modern times, especially upon destruction of the Embry Dam in 2004, in order to restore the shad run (a major fishing resource of pre-European through early federalist times). Much of the former canal area in Fredericksburg is now a city park, with signage. The City of Fredericksburg and Spotsylvania County lobbied for its inclusion on the Virginia Landmarks Register, and it was placed upon the National Register of Historic Places in 1973, with the Carter's Run area achieving Rural Historic District status in 2014.
