= James K. Marshall =

Confederate Army officer in the American Civil War

- Born: April 17, 1839; Fauquier County, Virginia
- Died: July 3, 1863 (aged 24); Gettysburg, Pennsylvania
- Burial place: Hollywood Cemetery, Richmond, Virginia
- Relatives: John Marshall (grandfather); Edward Carrington Marshall (father)
- Military career
- Allegiance: Confederate States of America
- Branch: Confederate States Army
- Service years: 1861–1863
- Rank: Colonel
- Nickname: Jimmy
- Commands: 52nd North Carolina; Pettigrew's Brigade (Temporary)
- Conflicts: American Civil War: Battle of Goldsborough Bridge; New Bern Campaign; Washington Campaign; Gettysburg campaign; Battle of Gettysburg †

James Keith Marshall (April 17, 1839 – July 3, 1863) was a Confederate Army officer during the American Civil War. Marshall commanded the wounded J. Johnston Pettigrew's brigade during Pickett's Charge at the Battle of Gettysburg and died during the assault.

== Early life ==
Marshall was born in Fauquier County, Virginia, to Edward Carrington Marshall and Rebecca Courtenay Peyton Marshall. He was a grandson of Chief Justice of the United States John Marshall. He was related through blood or marriage to Thomas Jefferson, George E. Pickett, and Robert E. Lee. His great-grandfather had attended school with George Washington and was commander of the 3rd Virginia Infantry during the American Revolutionary War. He was also a first cousin of Col. Thomas A. Marshall and second cousin of General Lee's aide, Col. Charles Marshall.

Marshall studied at the Episcopal High School in Alexandria, Virginia, and graduated from the Virginia Military Institute in 1860. The Society of Cadets chose him as the final orator for graduation ceremonies. He also served as first lieutenant of a cadet company. When Virginia seceded from the Union, Marshall was teaching school in Edenton, North Carolina.

== Civil War ==
Marshall accepted a commission as captain of Company M of the 1st North Carolina "Bethel Regiment" under Col. Daniel Harvey Hill in the spring of 1861. He did not take part in the Battle of Big Bethel. He received a promotion to colonel of the 52nd North Carolina on April 23, 1862 under the command of Brig. Gen J. Johnston Pettigrew, despite having no combat experience. Marshall was initially elected to the post of lieutenant colonel and Zebulon Vance was elected colonel, however, Vance declined the position so Marshall took the spot instead. Marshall defended Norfolk, Virginia from federal gunboats, then defended the Blackwater River. Pettigrew's Brigade joined the Army of Northern Virginia in late May 1863, for the Gettysburg campaign.

=== Gettysburg ===
Pettigrew's Brigade saw intense fighting during the Battle of Gettysburg. On July 1, 1863, Marshall's regiment initially encountered two companies from the 80th New York Infantry at the Harmon farm. After dispersing these men, a portion of the 52nd North Carolina fought part of the 8th New York Cavalry at Meal's Orchard. The 52nd crossed Willoughby Run and faced resistance from more cavalry units around Fairfield Road. After crossing Fairfield Road, Marshall's men slammed into the flank of the 121st Pennsylvania of Lt. Col. Alexander Biddle, routing them from the field and sending them running toward Seminary Ridge. Marshall's men next attacked the 80th New York of Col. Theodore Gates and forced them to retreat. Soon after this attack, Maj. Gen. Henry Heth was wounded and Pettigrew was elevated to divisional command. Due to the high casualty rate in Pettigrew's Brigade command structure, Marshall was given charge of it. The brigade suffered 1,100 casualties out of 2,584 engaged, however Marshall's 52nd North Carolina suffered only 26 casualties.

The brigade was not involved in any fighting on July 2, 1863. Marshall had the brigade's Moravian band perform to heighten their morale after the first day's carnage.

Leading the decimated brigade during Pickett's Charge, Marshall's men crossed the field around the Bliss Farm and Stevens' Run and then crossed the Emmitsburg Rd, coming under withering fire at the fence line. While crossing the Emmitsburg Road, Marshall turned to Capt. Stockton Heth (son of Maj. Gen. Henry Heth) and said "We do not know which of us will be next to fall." Just minutes later, as Marshall neared the stonewall on Cemetery Ridge he was struck in the forehead and killed instantly by two bullets while encouraging his men.

== Aftermath ==
Marshall's family did not officially know of his death until several months later, when they received a letter from Marshall's cousin F. Lewis Marshall informing them that James K. Marshall died at Gettysburg. They had heard conflicting reports, and hoped that he was a prisoner of war.

Marshall's remains were buried on the field at Gettysburg. It is assumed, but not known for sure, that he was re-interred at Hollywood Cemetery in Richmond, Virginia.
