= Oak Hill (Delaplane, Virginia) =

Historic house in Virginia, United States

- U.S. National Register of Historic Places
- Virginia Landmarks Register
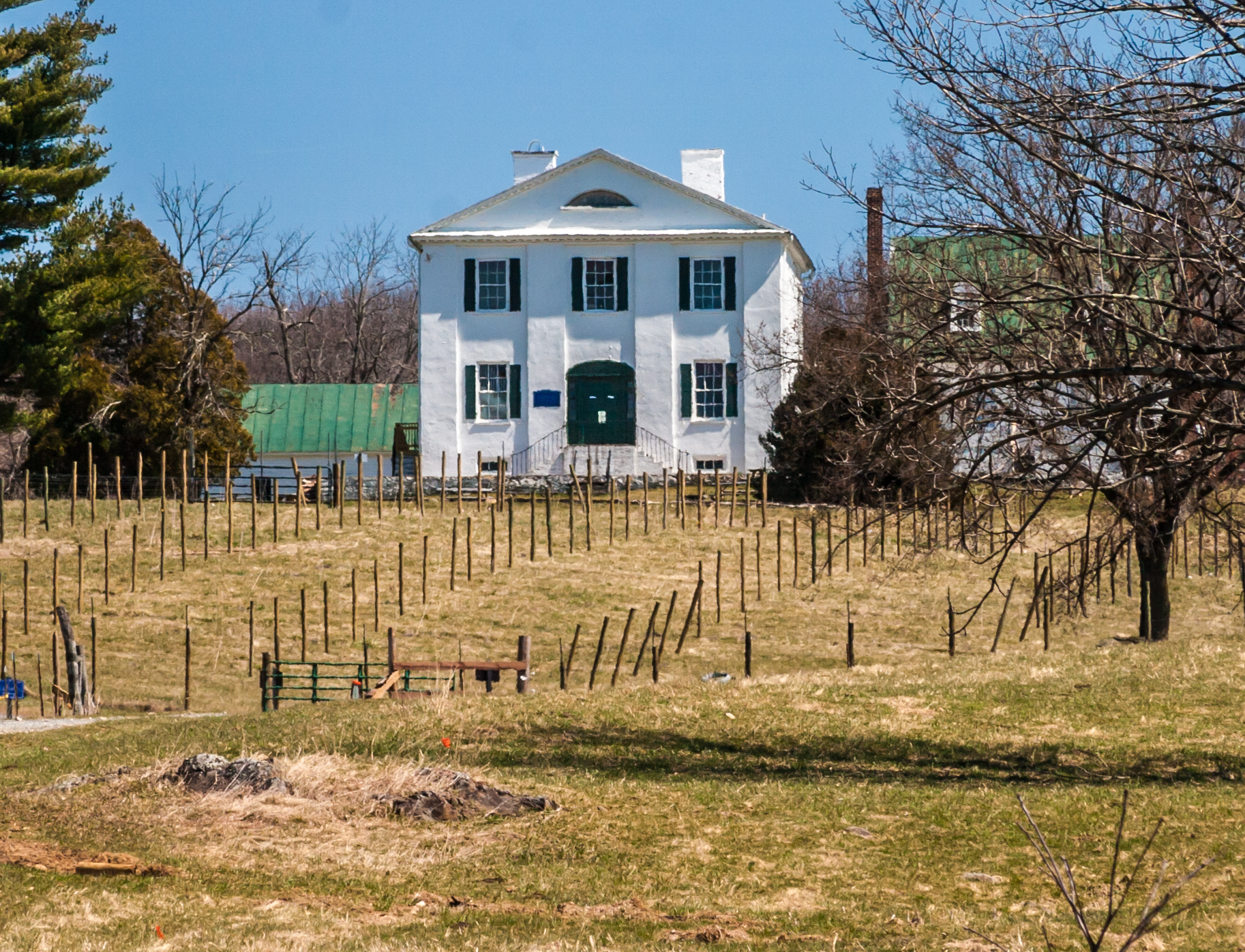

- Location within Northern Virginia Location within Virginia Location within the United States
- Location: 0.3 mi (0.48 km) East of U.S. Route 17 in Virginia
- Coordinates: 38.88868°N 77.90338°W
- Area: 100 acres (40 ha)
- Built: 1773, 1819
- Architectural style: Georgian, Federal
- NRHP reference No.: 73002013
- VLR No.: 030-0044

Significant dates
- Added to NRHP: June 18, 1973
- Designated VLR: April 17, 1973

Oak Hill is an historic home of the Marshall family in Delaplane, Virginia and a working farm with a view of the Blue Ridge Mountains.

It lies north of I-66, just east of the US-17/Delaplane exit from westbound I-66. It consists of two separate houses connected by a passageway. The earlier and smaller house, a Colonial farmhouse measuring 32 ft × 30 ft (9.8 m × 9.1 m), was built in 1773 by Colonel Thomas Marshall, father of John Marshall, Chief Justice of the United States. John Marshall lived in the Oak Hill house until his marriage in 1783.

In 1819, John Marshall built an attached 40 ft × 37 ft (12 m × 11 m) temple-form Classical Revival house for his firstborn son, lawyer and future delegate Thomas. Thomas died in 1835 and his son, CSA Lt.Col. Thomas Marshall in late 1864, so Oak Hill was sold out of the Marshall family. The property is now a private residence. It was listed on the National Register of Historic Places in 1973.

Oak Hill is currently owned by Charles Chamberlain. It is located directly to the North of Barrel Oak Winery, and has three acres of Norton grapes planted on the Westward-facing slope facing I-66.
