= George William Brent =

Virginia lawyer, politician, and Confederate officer

Member of the Virginia Senate from the Alexandria, Virginia district
- In office January 12, 1852 – December 4, 1853
- Preceded by: Wellington Gordon
- Succeeded by: James Keith Marshall

Personal details
- Born: August 1821 Alexandria, Virginia
- Died: January 2, 1872 (aged 50) Alexandria, Virginia
- Occupation: planter, lawyer, Confederate officer

Military service
- Allegiance: Confederate States of America
- Branch/service: Confederate Army
- Rank: Colonel
- Unit: Staff officer to Generals Braxton Bragg, P. G. T. Beauregard, Joseph E. Johnston
- Battles/wars: American Civil War

George William Brent (1821–1872), was a Virginia lawyer and politician, and a Confederate officer during the American Civil War. He represented Fauquier County and Rappahannock Counties in the Virginia Senate and Alexandria, Virginia in the Virginia Secession Convention of 1861.

== Early and family life ==
George William Brent was born in Alexandria, Virginia, to George F. Brent (tax collector for the Port of Alexandria) and his wife Elizabeth Parsons Brent in August 1821. He studied law at the University of Virginia in Charlottesville, Virginia, and graduated in 1842.

He married Cornelia D. Wood (1822–1848), daughter of Rice W. Wood and Sally Donahoe in Albemarle County on December 16, 1844. After her death, Brent married Lucy Goode (1830–1881), daughter of Dr. Thomas Goode, in Bath County, Virginia (where Dr. Goode operated a spa at the hot springs) on January 30, 1851. They had eight children, and Brent was ultimately survived by his widow Lucy, three sons and five daughters.

== Career ==
The 1850 federal census at Turners in Fauquier County, Virginia, lists Brent after fellow lawyer B. H. Shackelford among about two dozen people at what seems a boardinghouse. In late 1851, voters elected Brent to the Virginia Senate to represent Fauquier County, Virginia, and Rappahannock County, Virginia; he served one year before fellow lawyer and former Virginia delegate James Keith Marshall won the seat. Brent also served on the board of visitors of the Virginia Military Institute in Lexington, Virginia, in 1852 and 1853.

By the 1860 election, Brent had returned to his native Alexandria, Virginia. He unsuccessfully campaigned to become a presidential elector for Stephen A. Douglas. In 1861, Alexandria's voters elected Brent, a Unionist and pro-slavery, as the city's delegate to the Virginia Secession Convention.

Days after Virginia seceded despite his votes, on May 2, 1861, Brent fulfilled his promise to put the state's interests first and was commissioned a major in Company S, 17th Virginia Infantry. He served with the Army of Tennessee at the Battle of Shiloh. However, most of his service was as a staff officer and inspector, which earned him promotion to lieutenant colonel and full colonel. Brent served on the staff of Confederate Generals Braxton Bragg, P. G. T. Beauregard, and Joseph E. Johnston. By 1864, he was trying to reorganize the remaining Georgia railroads to assist Gen. Beauregard. He also reported on the condition of Richmond's hospitals. Brent surrendered with General Johnston and his troops in Greensboro, North Carolina, on April 26, 1865.

== Death ==
On April 27, 1870, Brent was among the many people severely injured when the floor of Virginia's Supreme Court of Appeals collapsed in Richmond with 300 people in the chamber. Although he recovered from those injuries, about a year later, Brent caught typhus and pneumonia, and died at his home in Alexandria, age 51, as 1872 began. He was buried at Old St. Mary's Church in Alexandria. His wartime diary is variously listed at the archives of the Western Reserve Historical Society and Duke University.
