= Thomas Marshall (Virginia politician, born 1784) =

American politician (1784–1835)

Thomas C. Marshall
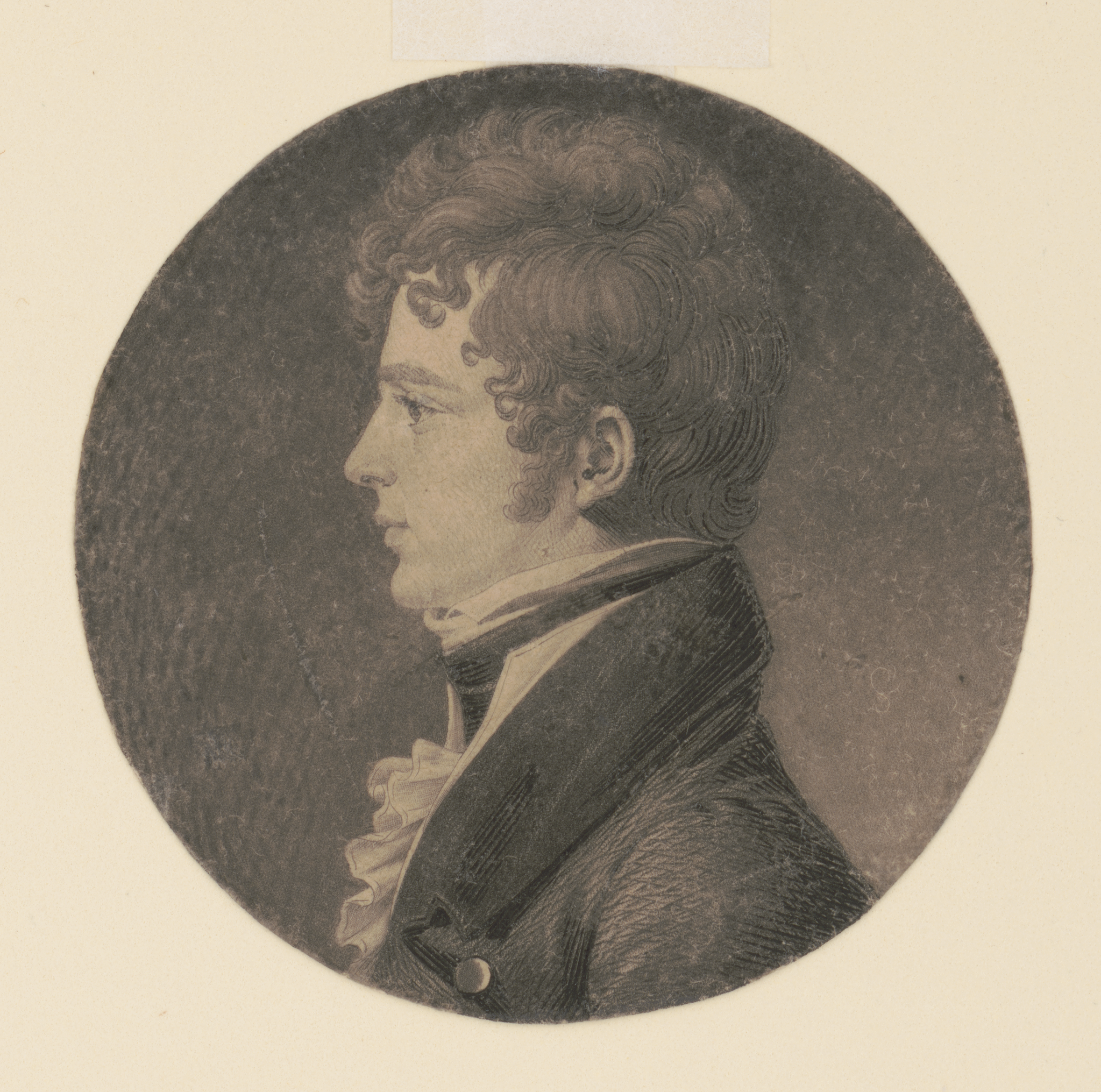
- 1808 sketch of Marshall

Member of the Virginia House of Delegates from the Fauquier County district
- In office December 6, 1830 – June 29, 1835
- Preceded by: Mark A. Chilton
- Succeeded by: William R. Smith

Member of the Virginia House of Delegates from the Fauquier County district
- In office December 3, 1827 – , 1828
- Preceded by: Mark A. Chilton
- Succeeded by: Mark A. Chilton

Personal details
- Born: July 21, 1784 Richmond, Virginia, U.S.
- Died: June 29, 1835 (aged 50) Baltimore, Maryland, U.S.
- Spouse: Margaret Wardrop Lewis (m. 1809; died 1829)
- Children: 7
- Education: Princeton University
- Occupation: Lawyer, planter, politician

Thomas C. Marshall (July 21, 1784 – June 29, 1835) was an American lawyer, planter, and politician. He lived at Oak Hill plantation and represented Fauquier County in the Virginia House of Delegates from 1830 until his death in 1835.

== Early life ==
The firstborn of Chief Justice John Marshall and his wife, the former Mary Willis Ambler (both families being among the First Families of Virginia), Thomas Marshall was named for his paternal grandfather, the revolutionary Thomas Marshall who moved to Fauquier County and built Oak Hill, then gave it to his son John Marshall as he moved further westward into Kentucky. Thomas Marshall received a private education locally, then graduated from Princeton University in 1803, after which he read law.

He married Margaret Wardrop Lewis (1792–1829) in 1809 and had sons John James Marshall (1811-1854), Fielding Lewis Marshall (1819-1902) and Col. Thomas C. Marshall (1826-1864), as well as daughters Agnes Harwood Marshall Taliaferro (b. 1819), Mary Marshall Archer (1816-1878), Ann Lewis Marshall Jones (1821-1880) and Margaret Lewis Marshal Smith (1823-1907).

== Career ==
This Thomas Marshall lived at Oak Hill, his grandfather's former estate in Fauquier County which John Marshall had inherited in 1803 and used as a summer retreat. He built an attached house for this Thomas Marshall in 1819, after which Thomas lived on and operated the estate, which was initially in disrepair and its soil exhausted. Like his grandfather, father and brothers, Thomas Marshall farmed using enslaved labor. In the 1820 federal census, he owned 48 slaves, as well as had a young son, two young daughters and an overseer living with his family. In the 1830 federal census, Thomas Marshall owned 64 slaves in addition to the eight white people in his household.

In 1827 Fauquier county voters elected Thomas Marshall as one of their two delegates in the Virginia General Assembly (alongside Alexander D. Kelly) and he began his state legislative service on December 3, 1827. However neither was re-elected in 1828, voters instead choosing Mark A. Chilton and John Robert Wallace. On January 6, 1830 John Macrae resigned as one of Fauquier County's delegates to the Virginia Constitutional Convention of 1829-1830 and Thomas Marshall replaced him for the final sessions. Then Fauquier voters elected and re-elected Marshall to the Virginia House of Delegates, so he began his longer stint of legislative service on December 6, 1830, which ended with his death in 1835. He served alongside Aldridge James in 1830-31, then with Mark A. Chilton (1831–32) (James and Chilton had been the two Fauquier County delegates in the 1829-30 session). John Robert Wallace was Fauquier's other delegate in 1832-33, and for his final two terms Thomas Marshall served with James French (1833–35). Reportedly, Thomas Marshall spoke out against forced exportation of slaves from Virginia southward during legislative debates in 1831 and 1832.

== Death and legacy ==
Thomas Marshall died shortly after taking shelter from a summer storm in the Baltimore County Courthouse then under repair in Baltimore, Maryland. He and Dr. John Hanson Thomas were en route to Philadelphia to see their ailing father when lightning hit the chimney and a dislodged brick fell and fractured Thomas' skull. Thomas Marshall died without regaining consciousness a week later, on June 29, 1835, but that was withheld from his father.

Although Fauquier County voters elected no Marshall to succeed him in the next election, in the following election they elected his brother Edward Carrington Marshall as one of their two delegates, and would later elect another younger brother, James Keith Marshall.

Although this Thomas Marshall did not survive his father, he had outlived both his wife and his eldest son, and left seven orphaned children. His youngest son and namesake, Lt. Col. Thomas C. Marshall Jr., would buy Oak Hill from his elder brother John (who died in 1854), then volunteered to fight with the Confederate States Army. Initially commissioned as a captain with the 7th Virginia Cavalry, the junior Thomas Marshall initially trained and fought in a local militia company led by Turner Ashby, had become an aide to General Stonewall Jackson at the First Battle of Manassas (which Col. Ashby missed), and would earn the rank of Col. as well as have six horses shot from under him and be wounded twice before dying in a skirmish in November 1864. His death (and postwar economic turmoil) caused Oak Hill to be sold out of the family. The middle son, Fielding L. Marshall, who had participated in the Virginia militia under Turner Ashby including after John Brown's raid on Harper's Ferry survived the war, as did his brother-in-law Col. Alexander Galt Taliaferro of the 13th Virginia Infantry and Gloucester County, Virginia.
