= John Marshall Park =

Park in Washington, D.C., U.S.

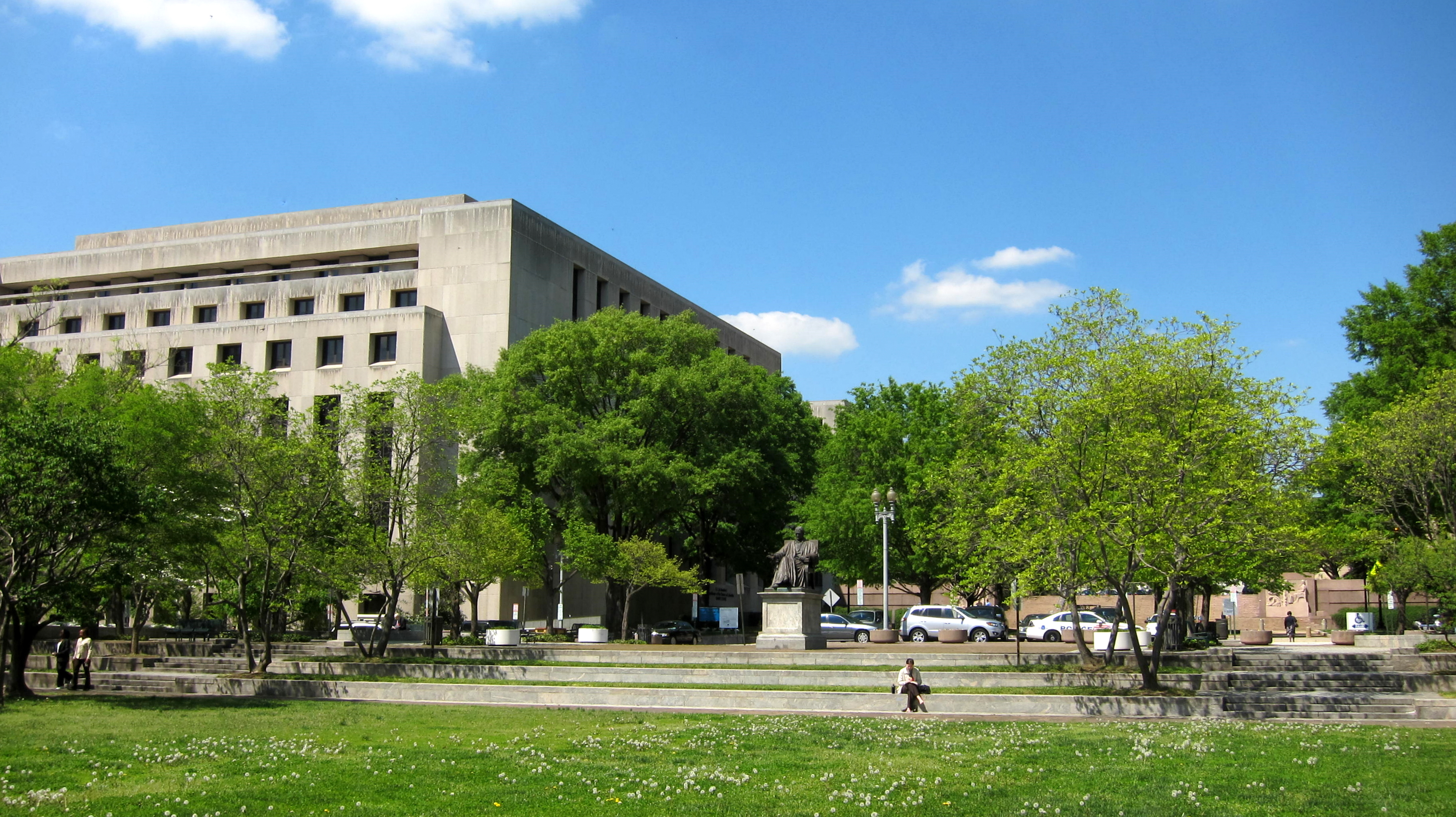
- John Marshall Park, Washington, D.C. (April 2010)

- Location within Central Washington, D.C.
- Location: Washington, D.C.
- Coordinates: 38°53′36″N 77°01′03″W

John Marshall Park is a park located in the Judiciary Square neighborhood of Washington, D.C. The park is in honor of John Marshall, a U.S. Representative (1799–1800), Secretary of State (1800–1801), and the fourth Chief Justice of the Supreme Court (1801–1835).

A cast of the sculpture Chief Justice John Marshall, sculpted by William Wetmore Story in 1883, is situated on the north end of the park. Playing chess was "a favorite pastime" of Marshall. The sculpture The Chess Players is located on the east side of the park.
