= Thomas Goode (physician) =

American physician

Thomas Goode (October 31, 1787, in Mecklenburg County, Virginia – April 2, 1858, in Bath County, Virginia) was a Virginian medical doctor who purchased the Warm Springs resort in Virginia and helped establish European style hydrotherapies there.

== Biography ==
Thomas Goode was born in 1787 to Colonel Samuel Goode who was a member of the U.S. Congress from 1799 to 1801. He was the father of at least seven daughters and two sons. An enthusiastic politician, he was buried near the Hot Springs Hotel.

Dr. Goode was acknowledged as "the proprietor during the heyday of the 'Springs Tour'." He was a medical doctor trained in Philadelphia and Edinburgh. He toured the spas of Europe and applied that knowledge to the services he offered at the hot springs, including something he called a Spout Bath, a bath with "three to four inch columns of water pockets falling from a height of six feet" that was directed to massage the desired area of the body."

== Legacy and death ==
In 1832, Dr. Thomas Goode purchased the "Homestead" resort and spa from the family of Thomas Bullitt. Today, it is known as The Omni Homestead Resort, "He [Dr. Goode] was a prominent physician and is responsible for the European style of many different spa therapies."

Dr. Goode authored several pieces of work on the healing powers of springs and waters.

Dr. Goode died on April 2, 1858, in Bath County, Virginia. His grave is next to his wife, Mary A. Knox Goode, at the Presbyterian church in Hot Springs, Virginia. An inscription reads: "An Eminent Physician; Ever Strenuous and True; A Wise and Good Man; Without Fear and Without Reproach."

Brent's daughter Lucy married George William Brent, a prominent citizen of Alexandria, Virginia, and had three sons and five daughters by him.

== Bibliography ==
- Goode, Thomas. The Invalid's Guide to the Virginia Hot Springs: Containing an Account of the Medical Properties of These Waters, with Cases Illustrative of Their Effects. 1839. http://www.worldcat.org/oclc/488613917
- Goode, Samuel, and Thomas Goode. Some Account of the Medicinal Properties of the Hot Springs, Virginia; Also an Analysis of the Water, with Cases of Cure of Gout ... Etc. Richmond: Printed by C.H. Wynne, 1857. http://www.worldcat.org/oclc/7809839
- Goode, Thomas. The Invalid's Guide to the Virginia Hot Springs: Containing an Account of the Medical Properties of These Waters ... Also, an Account of the Medicinal Application and Effects of the Waters of Weisbaden, Wildbad, and Carlsbad. Richmond: J.W. Randolph, 1854. http://www.worldcat.org/oclc/23028565
- Goode, Thomas, James Johnson, A. B. Granville, and Edwin Lee. The Invalid's Guide to the Virginia Hot Springs: Containing an Account of the Medical Properties of These Waters, with Cases Illustrative of Their Effects; Also an Account of the Medicinal Application and Effects of the Waters of Weisbaden, Wildbad, and Carlsbad : Three of the Most Celebrated Hot Springs of Germany. Richmond, Va: J.W. Randolph, 121, Main Street, 1854. http://www.worldcat.org/oclc/80193596
- Tardy, Thomas Goode, Williams, Cameron, and James Alfred Jones. Cameron's Ex'ix V. Goode's Ex'r, &C. Note for Tardy and Others, Defendants. 1860. Notes: Caption title. At head of title: In the Circuit Court of Albemarle. http://www.worldcat.org/oclc/24904411
- Goode, Thomas. [Manuscript Concerning Procedures and Treatment of Diseases]. 1810. Notes: Spine title: Physick's surgery. Handwritten manuscript. 220 pages. http://www.worldcat.org/oclc/244250258
- Goode, Thomas. The Invalid's Guide to the Virginia Hot Springs: Containing an Account of the Medical Properties of These Waters ... Also, an Account of the Medicinal Application and Effects of the Waters of Weisbaden, Wildbad, and Carlsbad ... from the Works of ... Drs. Johnson & Granville, & Mr. Edwin Lee. Richmond: P.D. Bernard, printer, 1851. 88 pages. http://www.worldcat.org/oclc/16638494
