= Edward Carrington Marshall =

American politician (1805–1882)

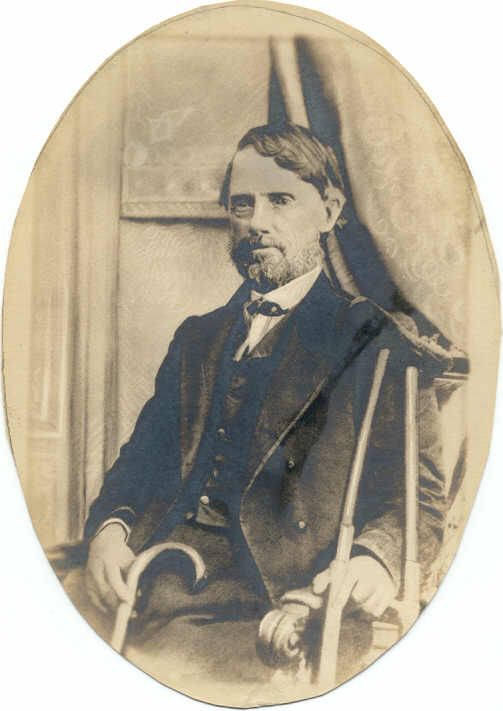
- Photographic portrait of Edward Carrington Marshall

Member of the Virginia House of Delegates from the Fauquier County district
- In office December 5, 1836 – January 6, 1839
- Preceded by: William R. Smith
- Succeeded by: Elias Edmonds

Personal details
- Born: January 13, 1805 Richmond, Virginia
- Died: February 8, 1882 (aged 77) Innis, Fauquier County, Virginia
- Spouse: Rebecca Courtenay Peyton
- Children: 7 including James K. Marshall
- Education: Harvard University
- Occupation: Railroad Executive, Planter, Businessman, Politician, Farmer

Edward Carrington Marshall (January 13, 1805 – February 8, 1882) was a Virginia farmer, planter, businessman, and politician. He represented Fauquier County in the Virginia House of Delegates 1834-1838 and became president of the Manassas Gap Railroad.

== Early life ==
The youngest son of Chief Justice John Marshall and his wife, the former Mary Willis Ambler (both families being among the First Families of Virginia), Edward Carrington Marshall was born in Richmond. His first and middle names reflect Edward Carrington, husband of John Marshall's sister. Like his brothers Thomas Marshall (1784-1835), John Marshall (1798-1833) and James Keith Marshall (1800-1862), Edward Carrington Marshall attended Harvard College. However, he was the only one of them to actually graduate (in 1826), and he outlived all his siblings.

On February 12, 1829, he married Rebecca Courtenay Peyton (1810 - 1888). They had seven children who survived them. Their son James K. Marshall (1839 - 1863), a Confederate officer, died at the Battle of Gettysburg.

== Career ==
As did his brothers, Edward Marshall farmed using enslaved labor. In a will drafted in 1827, his father gave the recent Harvard graduate Fauquier county land and "all my slaves and property of every description on the said lands"; a revised will in 1831 indicated the slaves had been transferred to E.C. Marshall, although the land would not pass until the Chief Justice died. Thus, E.C. Marshall owned 34 slaves in Fauquier County in 1850, and 38 slaves in Fauquier County's Southwest Revenue District in 1860.

Meanwhile this Marshall served as Fauquier County's delegate in the Virginia General Assembly 1836-1838, alongside Elias Edmunds in 1836-37 and alongside Edward Digges in 1838; the pair succeeded William R. Smith and Absalom Hickerson (who served one session) and was succeeded by Elias Edmonds and Josiah Tidball (who also served only a single session). Various Marshall family members had held one of the county's two seats in the House of Delegates for most of the decade. His elder brother Thomas Marshall had won election several times (1830 until his death in 1835), and his younger brother James K. Marshall would twice win election (serving 1839-41).

Two prewar riding accidents restricted this Marshall's mobility and caused him to use a cane or various contrivances-—the 1836 accident injured his ankle severely and the second accident caused 13 years of confinement, although E.C. Marshall was determined to remain active and traveled 6 miles to church to teach Sunday School.

Marshall envisioned linking the farms of the Shenandoah Valley and his Piedmont region at the Manassas Gap with the port cities of Alexandria, Virginia and Richmond, Virginia. Marshall became the president of the Manassas Gap Railroad, which obtained a charter from the Virginia General Assembly in 1850. That year Marshall also sold the home constructed for him and his new wife after their wedding ("Carrington") and moved to a farm about a mile away in Markham near the new line). The railway would link Strasburg, Virginia to Tudor Hall (a/k/a Manassas Junction, later renamed Manassas, Virginia), where it joined with the Orange and Alexandria Railroad (O&A), which thus linked the Piedmont and Shenandoah Valley farmers to the ports of Alexandria, Virginia and Washington, D.C. as well as Richmond, Virginia.

Construction began, and by 1854 the line extended from Mount Jackson, Virginia to Manassas. Towns also grew on the route, including Markham, Fauquier County, Virginia near Marshall's home. To reduce lease payments to the O&A, the MGRR began raising funds to construct an alternate line between Gainesville, Virginia and Alexandria. However, opposition of some landowners delayed construction, until the Panic of 1857 made financing difficult.

During American Civil War, Confederate troops embarked in Delaplane to the First Battle of Manassas. Portions of the unfinished MGRR Independent Line also served as earthworks for Confederate troops at the Second Battle of Manassas. Both armies used the railroad to transport troops as well as supplies. Sections of the line were destroyed many times; none of its rolling stock survived the war. Furthermore, his son James Keith Marshall, an 1860 VMI graduate, was commissioned a Confederate officer and died at the Battle of Gettysburg.

In 1867, Marshall sold the remaining Manassas Gap Railroad assets to the Orange and Alexandria Railroad, which completed and rebuilt it before being absorbed into the Richmond and Danville Railroad. After his death (and the railroad's bankruptcy after the Panic of 1893), it was absorbed into the Southern Railway, a multi-state system of over 3,000 miles.

Meanwhile, Marshall secured a place in the Pension Office in Washington D.C. during the administrations of Ulysses S. Grant and Rutherford B. Hayes. He had built a new home, "Innis", in 1871-1872, and his family continued farming, and he visited during breaks from Washington, as well as also assisted in the nearby school run by his friend Dr. Jacquelin Ambler.

== Death and legacy ==
Marshall died at home, Innis, in 1882, and was buried in the cemetery of Leeds Episcopal Church. Some of his correspondence is archived at the Virginia Historical Society and the University of Virginia archive. Both Carrington and Innis survive today, and since 2007 have been designated contributing buildings in the John Marshall Leeds Manor Rural Historic District.
