= The Chess Players (sculpture) =

1983 sculpture in Washington DC, United States

- The sculpture in 2015
- Artist: Lloyd Lillie
- Year: 1983
- Location: Washington, D.C., United States; 38.893168°N 77.017311°W

The Chess Players is an outdoor 1983 sculpture by Lloyd Lillie, installed in John Marshall Park in Washington, D.C., United States.

== See also ==
- 1983 in art
- List of public art in Washington, D.C., Ward 6
