= James Keith Marshall =

American planter and politician (1800–1862)

Member of the Virginia Senate from the Fauquier and Rappahannock Counties district
- In office December 5, 1853 – December 2, 1862
- Preceded by: George W. Brent
- Succeeded by: Alexander J. Marshall

Member of the Virginia House of Delegates from the Fauquier County district
- In office December 2, 1839 – December 5, 1841 Serving with Robert E. Scott
- Preceded by: Elias Edmonds
- Succeeded by: James W. Foster

Personal details
- Born: February 13, 1800 Richmond, Virginia
- Died: December 2, 1862 (aged 62) Marshall, Virginia
- Spouse: Claudia Hamilton Burwell
- Education: Harvard University
- Occupation: Planter

James Keith Marshall (February 13, 1800 – December 2, 1862) was a Virginia planter and politician. He served in both houses of the Virginia General Assembly, including after Virginia declared its secession during the American Civil War.

== Early and family life ==
Born to Chief Justice John Marshall and his wife Mary Willis Ambler Marshall (1766–1831) in Richmond on February 13, 1800, James Keith Marshall had several brothers and sisters. He attended Harvard College, as did all but one of his brothers, but never graduated.

He married Claudia Hamilton Burwell Marshall (1800–1884) in 1821, and they had eleven children, many of whom died in childhood.

== Career ==
Marshall withdrew from Harvard in early 1815 after being disciplined and his brother John Marshall, Jr. expelled, and soon began a career as an investment banker in Philadelphia with the house of Willing & Francis. He returned to Fauquier County, Virginia circa 1821 and received a plantation from his father as a wedding present. He then farmed using enslaved labor, owning 47 slaves in the 1830 census, many slaves in the 1840 census after his father's death, and 55 slaves in the 1850 census.

After his elder brother Thomas's unexpected death in 1835, first his brother Edward Carrington Marshall would run for and win one of the county's two seats in the Virginia General Assembly, and then after Edward fell from a horse and became disabled, James Keith Marshall ran and represented the county from 1839 until 1841 (winning re-election once, but losing in 1838). In 1853, voters elected James Keith Marshall to the Virginia Senate, where he represented Fauquier and neighboring Rappahannock Counties. He succeeded George W. Brent, and was re-elected in 1857. After Virginia declared its secession, Marshall continued to serve in the Senate, but died in office on December 2, 1862. His cousin Alexander J. Marshall succeeded him.

James Keith Marshall was buried in the family plot in the cemetery of Leeds Episcopal Church.
