= 1864 Washington Arsenal explosion =

Industrial disaster in Washington, D.C.

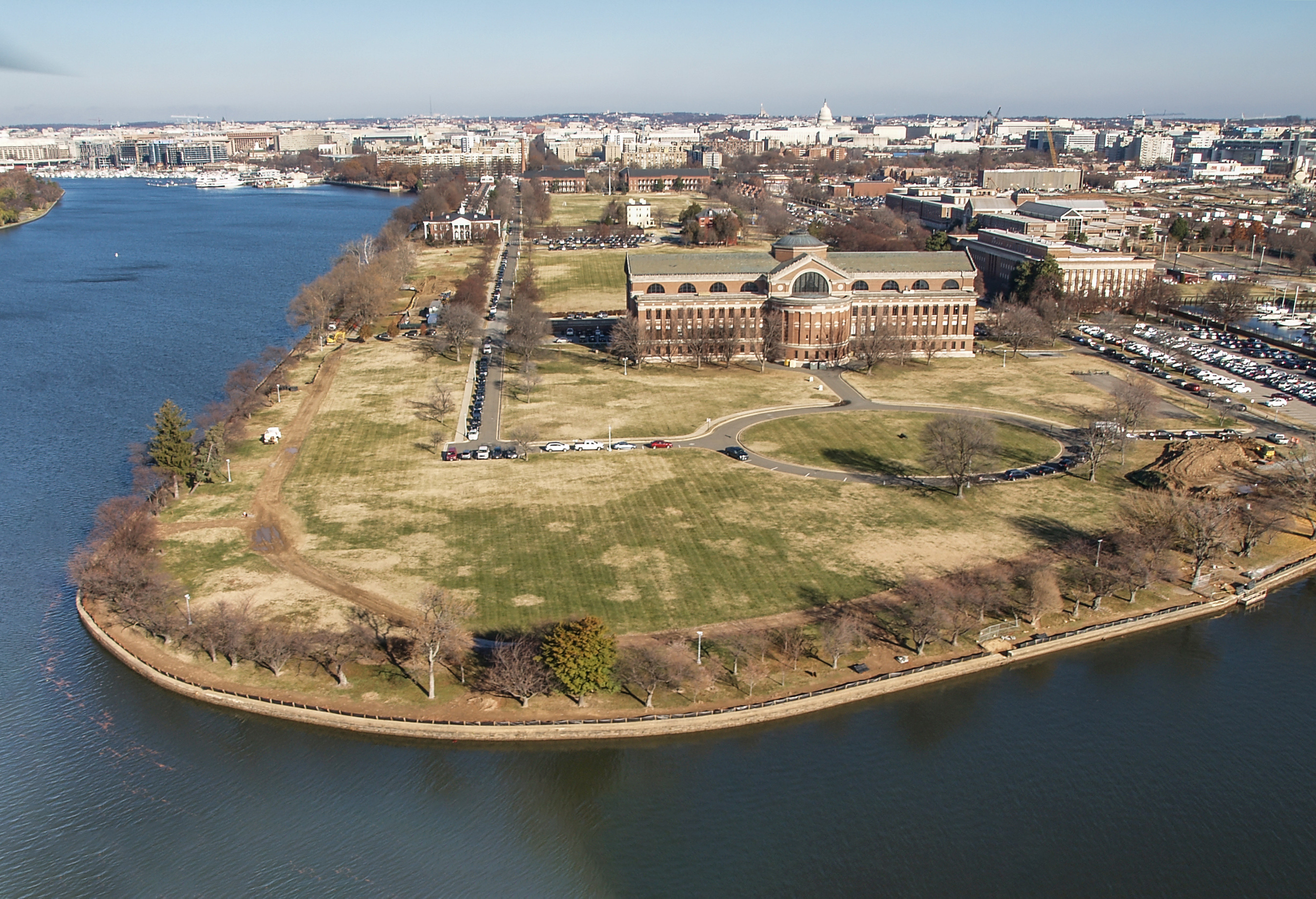
- Bird's eye view of the location of the explosion, now home to Fort Lesley J. McNair and the Army War College.
- Date: June 17, 1864
- Location: The Washington Arsenal, Washington, D.C.

The 1864 Washington Arsenal explosion occurred on June 17, 1864, at the Washington Arsenal (now known as Fort Lesley J. McNair) in Washington, D.C. after the Arsenal's superintendent left hundreds of flares to dry in the hot summer sun near some of the Arsenal's buildings. When the explosion happened, some of the flares entered into a warehouse via an open window. Inside, a fire quickly started and, when a barrel of gunpowder was set on fire, the roof of the building blew off. The warehouse was staffed with 108 women at the time of the explosion; 21 of them, mostly Irish immigrants, died and many more were seriously injured. Assistance from other Arsenal employees and several local fire companies soon arrived.

The day after the explosion, there were four burials at Mount Olivet Cemetery. The following day, a large number of people attended the funeral service held at the Arsenal. Among those in attendance were President Abraham Lincoln and Secretary of War Edwin Stanton. The processions then moved to gravesites in Congressional Cemetery where two pits were dug: one for the identified bodies and the second for the unidentified. In the years that followed, there were additional explosions that happened at the Arsenal, including one that claimed the lives of 10 men. The Arsenal was closed a few years after the Civil War ended, and renamed Washington Barracks for many years, until acquiring its current name, Fort Lesley J.McNair.

== History ==
=== Background ===
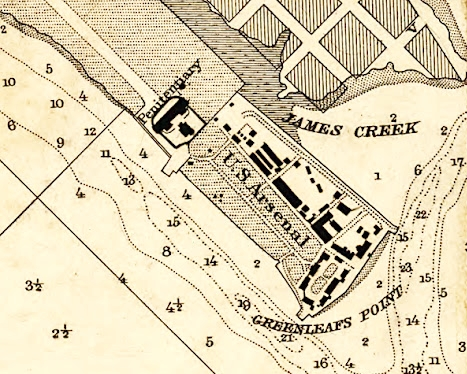
An 1862 map of the Arsenal shows the layout of the area, with black shapes representing buildings

During the Civil War, most young and middle-aged men were conscripted or volunteered to fight in the Union Army or Confederate Army. While husbands from Washington, D.C., were busy fighting in the war, some of their wives took up jobs throughout the city to earn money or to demonstrate patriotism. Many of these workers were women from the working class and immigrant community. At the Washington Arsenal, now known as Fort Lesley J. McNair, women worked a variety of jobs. The Arsenal was located on the peninsula where the Potomac River and Anacostia River bordered the area. The peninsula was called "The Island" despite not being one. On this "island", women and men would come to work at the Arsenal, the largest of its kind during the war.

The Arsenal was established in 1791 and, during the Civil War, it housed around 40 buildings containing ammunition, flares, and other military artillery. One of the buildings on the north side of the Island was a penitentiary until 1862, when it was converted into ammunition storage. It was in this building where the co-conspirators of the assassination of Abraham Lincoln were hanged. During an inspection in early 1862, there was an estimated 16.5 million rounds of ammunition at the Arsenal.

=== Explosion ===
On the morning of June 17, 1864, superintendent Tom Brown began his daily inspections of the warehouses. Employees at one of the warehouses had just finished producing a large amount of flares. It was hot that day, so Brown had several hundred flares lying in the sun to dry. The flares contained potassium chloride, strontium nitrate, and carbon, and were drying in an out-of-the way area by two buildings. Just before noon that day, there was an intense explosion caused by the sun igniting the flares. It completely destroyed a 100-foot (30 m) long building that was originally designed into four sections. A window had been opened in the hottest room of the building and one of the flares entered the building through the open window, setting off an explosion of cartridges and a barrel of gunpowder. This caused the entire roof to blow off the building while the interior was set afire. At the time of the explosion, 108 women had been working in the building. Earlier that morning, the women had received a message thanking them for donating $170 towards a memorial for the Allegheny Arsenal explosion that occurred in 1862.

Many of the women were wearing hoop skirts that caught fire as they tried to escape the burning building. Some of the women were trapped because of the large worktables that had blocked entrances or windows. A few women who were rescued from the flames were taken to the Potomac River and thrown in the water to extinguish their burning clothes. Three women were most likely in shock when they began running up a hill while their clothes were on fire, but Arsenal employees managed to save them. Some of the survivors who were able to walk made their way to boats en route to the Sixth Street Wharf, where their families could take them home.

The explosion resulted in the worst civilian disaster in the nation's capital during the war. In total, 21 women died, some of whom were burned beyond recognition and only identifiable by a ring, piece of a dress, or other personal items. Some were not identified. In addition to the deaths, dozens of women were injured including some who were blinded. After the explosion, uninjured people from the Arsenal, military medical personnel, and several volunteer fire department companies arrived and began assisting the wounded.

=== Aftermath ===
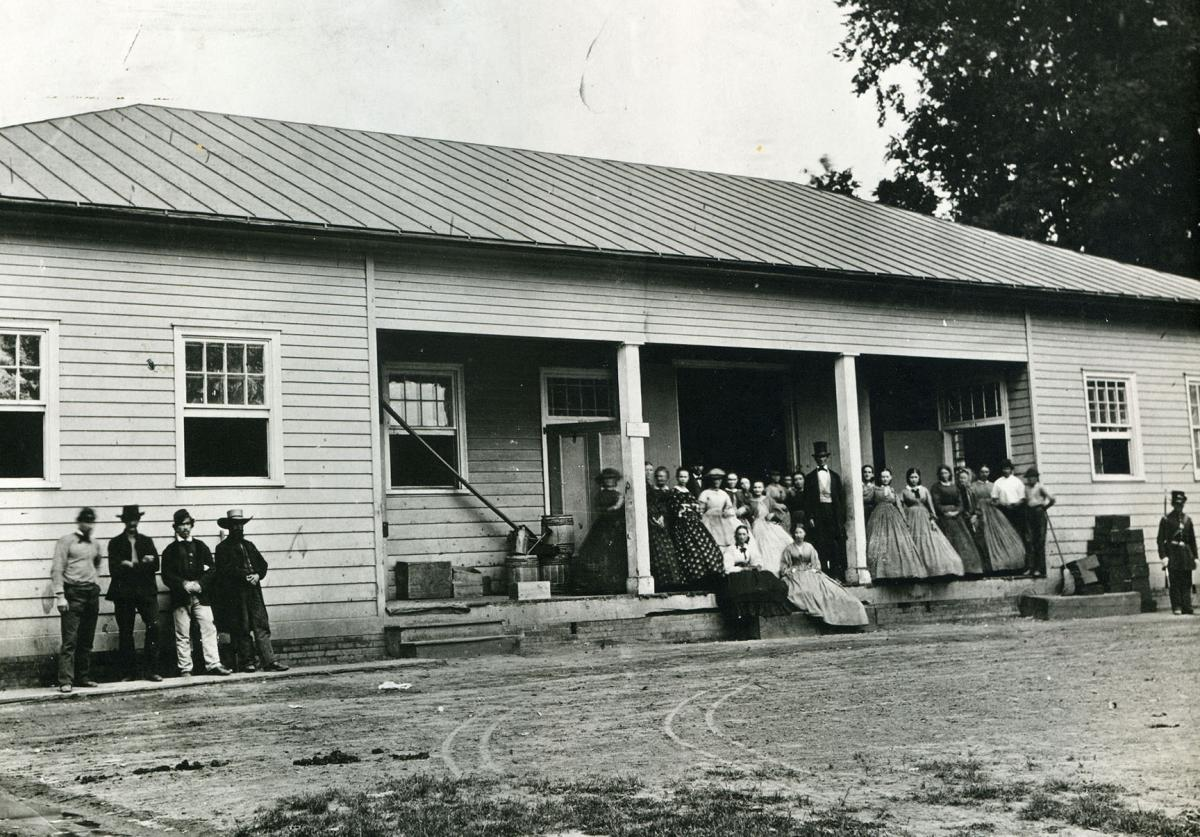
Arsenal employees posing in front of the building before the explosion

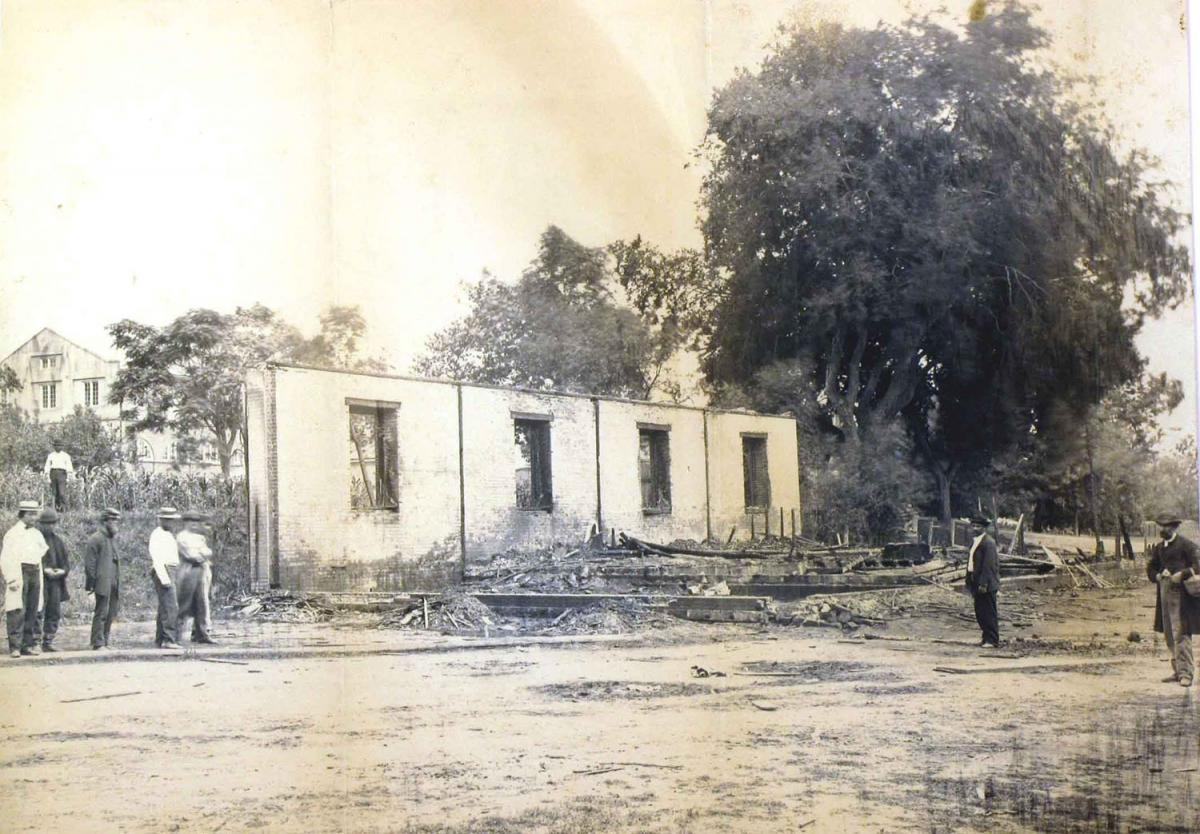
The building after the 1864 explosion

News spread quickly throughout the city of the Arsenal disaster. A special edition of The Evening Star was printed that afternoon detailing the events of the explosion. When told of the disaster, Secretary of War Edwin Stanton announced the U.S. Department of War would be covering all expenses related to funeral costs. He told the Arsenal's commandant "You will not spare any means to express the respect and sympathy of the government for the deceased and their surviving friends." The following day male employees of the Arsenal adopted resolutions to not only have a funeral service for the women who died, but to include a large procession to Congressional Cemetery, where a monument would be erected to honor the victims.

The first funerals took place on June 18, when four of the victims were buried at Mount Olivet Cemetery. The remaining victims were buried the following day, except for one whose funeral was at her home and another who died three weeks later. The Arsenal held a funeral on June 19 for the victims of the explosion. Arsenal employees made coffins for each victim, with a silver-plated plaque on each one listing their name. Victims who were not identified also had plaques on their coffins, but the name was listed as "Unknown." Their coffins were adorned with flowers from city residents. St. Dominic Catholic Church's Reverend Father A. Bakel spoke at the service as did Reverend S. H. Leech from Gorsuch Methodist Church.

Among the attendees at the July 19 funeral were President Abraham Lincoln and Stanton. A funeral procession began at 3:15pm after the Army Medical Department put the bodies in hearses. Around 150 carriages traveled from the Arsenal to Congressional Cemetery followed by all employees of the Arsenal. A carriage with the remains of 13-year old Sallie McElfresh joined the procession at F Street. The funeral service at Congressional Cemetery began when the six identified victims and eight unidentified were placed in pits measuring 15-feet (4.6 m) wide and 5 1/2-feet deep. The first pit is where the identified bodies were buried. The last victim who succumbed to her injuries a few weeks later was buried at the site in July. A second pit, for those who were unidentified, was located a few feet away. Victims McElfresh and Annie Bache were buried in nearby family plots. The crowd chanted "Farewell, sisters, farewell" as the coffins were being placed into the pits.

There was an investigation and a coroner's inquest of the disaster, which revealed thousands of cartridges were carelessly put in an area where they could ignite. Brown was also "guilty of the most culpable carelessness and negligence in placing highly combustible substances so near a building filled with human beings, indicating a most reckless disregard of human life." During the trial, Brown claimed to not know how the explosions occurred since the materials he was drying did not include sulphur. He did admit the pans were the ones he had placed near the building. Arsenal Commandant Major James G. Benton told the jury he was not present at the Arsenal during the explosion, but that after investigating the three pans outside the building, he knew that they were the cause. Additional witnesses confirmed seeing the flares on fire and causing explosions. An article in The Evening Star stated Brown had shown a "degree of indifference to human life," yet Brown was never charged with any crime.

Congress passed a resolution on July 4, 1864, to pay victims' families "the sum of two thousand dollars, be and the same is hereby, appropriated out of any money in the treasury not otherwise appropriated, for the relief of victims of such explosion, – said money to be distributed under the direction of Major Benton, commanding at said arsenal and in such manner as shall most conduce to the comfort and relief of said sufferers, according to their necessities respectively, and that he report to this house."

=== Monument ===
- Arsenal Monument
- U.S. National Register of Historic Places
- U.S. National Historic Landmark District – Contributing property
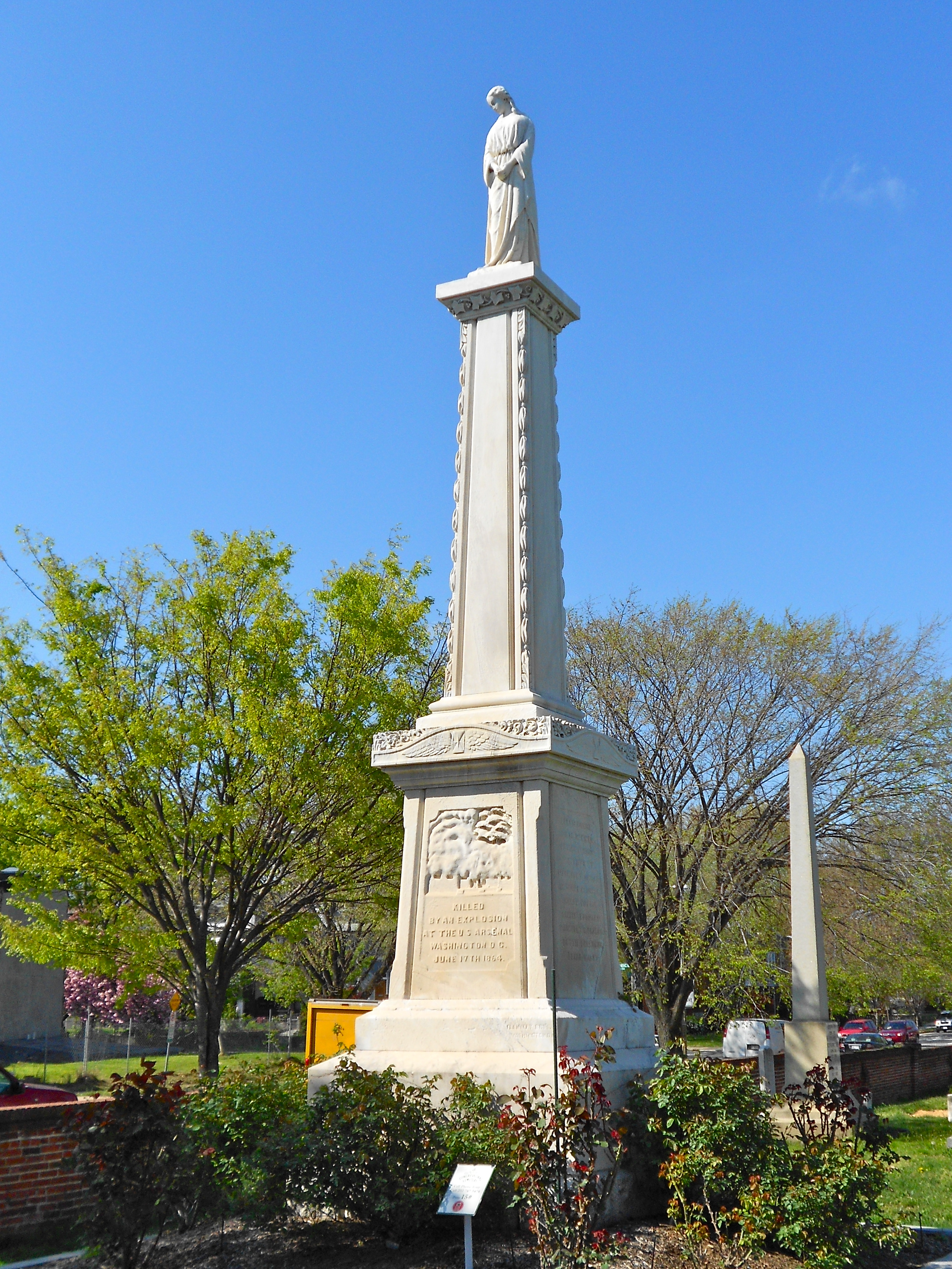
- Location: Washington, D.C.
- Coordinates: 38°52′53.3″N 76°58′49.9″W
- Built: 1865
- Architect: Lot Flannery (sculptor); Flannery Brothers Marble Manufacturers (fabricator)
- Part of: Congressional Cemetery
- NRHP reference No.: 69000292

Significant dates
- Added to NRHP: June 23, 1969
- Designated NHLDCP: June 14, 2011

Soon after the funeral, citizens of Washington, D.C. began raising funds for a monument to the victims. They managed to raise $3,000 within a year. A commission was created to find an artist and design for the monument. Commission members chose Lot Flannery and his company, Flannery Brothers. Flannery was an Irish American, like many of the victims. He carved the Grief statue on top of the monument, a few years before carving his most famous work, the statue of Abraham Lincoln in front of the District of Columbia City Hall. The monument was finished within a couple of months and dedicated on the one-year anniversary of the explosion.

The monument is 25 feet (7.6 m) tall and each side measures 5.6 feet (1.7 m) and was installed on June 17, 1865. The sculpture and pedestal are both made of marble, while the pediment is made of grey granite. The statue on top of the monument is of a woman with long hair wearing a gown, symbolizing Grief. Below her is a grape vine which symbolizes the sacrifice made by the victims. Her hands are clasped in front of her as she looks down. The second layer of the base includes reliefs of hourglasses with wings, demonstrating the women's time had ended. On two sides of the pedestal the name of each victim is carved. On the front of the pedestal is a relief of the explosion.

==== Inscriptions ====
The inscriptions on the monument are:

South face:

Killed
by an explosion
at the U.S. arsenal
Washington D.C.
June 17th 1864
Flannery Bro.'s
Washington, D.C.

East face:

Ellen Roche.
Julia McEwen.
Bridget Dun.
E. Tippet.
Margaret Horan.
Johanna Connors.
Susan Harrisi.
Lizzie Brahler.
Margaret C. Yonson.
Bettie Branagan.
Eliza Lacey.

West face:

Emma Baird.
Kate Brosnahan.
Louisa Lloyd.
Melissa Adams.
Emily Collins.
Rebecca Hull.
Annie S. Bache.
Mary Burroughs.
Sallie McElfresh.
Pinkey Scott.
(unsigned Founder's mark)

North face:

Erected
by public contribution
by the citizens of
Washington, D.C.
June 17th, 1865

=== Later history ===
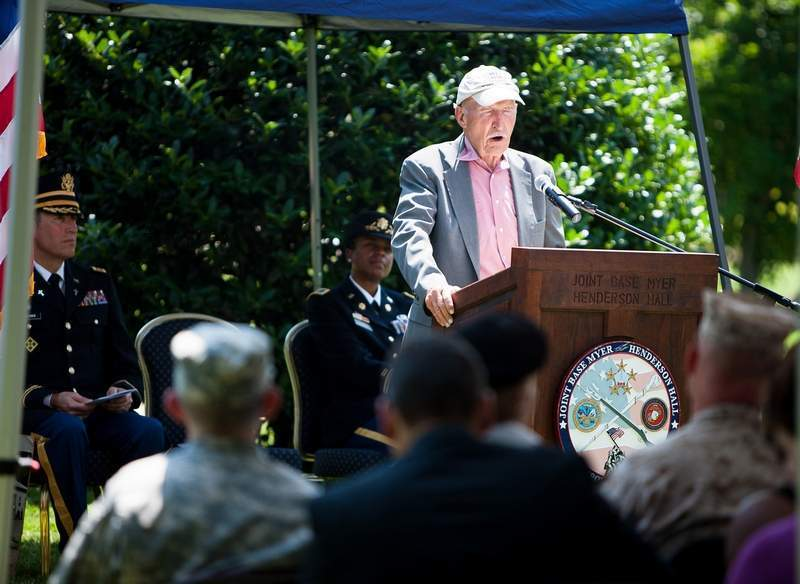
Ed Bearss speaking to a crowd at an event marking the 150th anniversary of the 1864 explosion

The explosion in 1864 wasn't the only industrial accident to take place at the Arsenal. In December 1865, while unloading old ammunition from a wagon, the ammunition fell and exploded. The ensuing explosion and fire resulted in 10 deaths. In describing the event, a reporter for The Evening Star wrote "The terrible scene, immediately after the explosion, was only equalled by the scene at the explosion in June 1864, some of the corpses being burned, blackened, and torn so as to expose the entrails, and none being recognizable from the features." In July 1871, another massive explosion occurred in one of the warehouses, destroying several nearby buildings, but without casualties since it occurred at 3 a.m. The blast was powerful enough to break windows throughout the Arsenal. The government closed the Arsenal in 1881, renaming it the Washington Barracks. The name was changed again in 1948 to its present name, Fort Lesley J. McNair.

In 2014, on the 150th anniversary of the explosion, Tánaiste Eamon Gilmore visited the monument site while on an official visit to the U.S. and laid a wreath because many of the women who died or were injured were Irish immigrants. Personnel from Joint Base Myer–Henderson Hall held a ceremony on the same day, honoring the women who lost their lives helping to defend the Union. Speakers at the ceremony included historian Ed Bearss and Colonel Fern O. Sumpter. At 11:50 a.m., the same time the explosion occurred, there was a moment of silence for the victims. The name of each victim was then read aloud.

== See also ==
- Allegheny Arsenal explosion
- List of industrial disasters
