= Lincoln Memorial =

National memorial in Washington, DC

- U.S. National Register of Historic Places
- U.S. National Memorial
- D.C. Inventory of Historic Sites
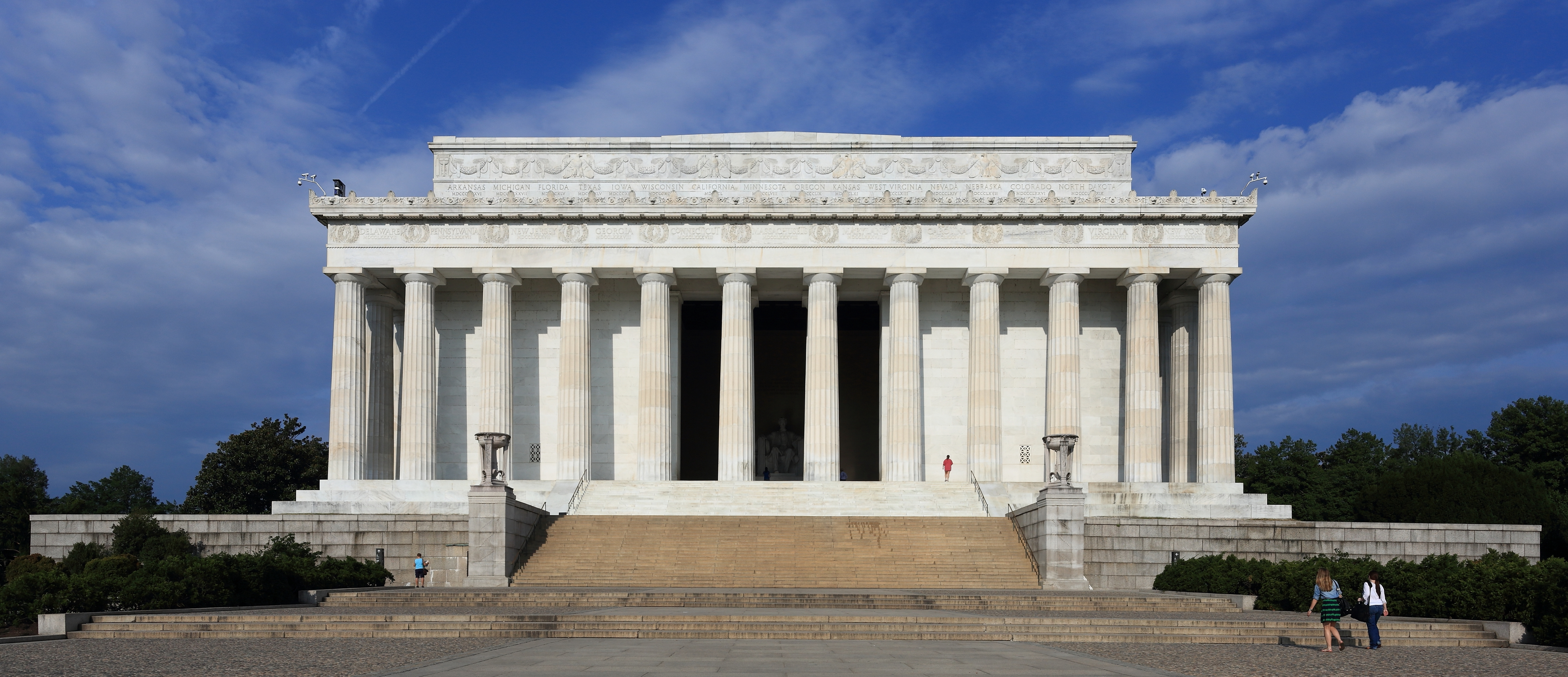
- The Lincoln Memorial in 2013

- Location within Central Washington, D.C. Location within the District of Columbia
- Location: National Mall, Washington, D.C., U.S.
- Coordinates: 38°53′21.4″N 77°3′0.5″W
- Area: 7.29 acres
- Built: 1922; 104 years ago
- Architect: Henry Bacon (architect); Daniel Chester French (sculptor)
- Architectural style: Greek Revival
- Visitation: 7,743,295 (2025)
- Website: Lincoln Memorial
- NRHP reference No.: 66000030
- DCIHS No.: 332

Significant dates
- Added to NRHP: October 15, 1966
- Designated DCIHS: November 8, 1964

The Lincoln Memorial is a U.S. national memorial honoring Abraham Lincoln, the 16th president of the United States, located on the western end of the National Mall of Washington, D.C. The memorial is built in a neoclassical style in the form of a classical temple. The memorial's architect was Henry Bacon. In 1920, Daniel Chester French designed the large interior Abraham Lincoln statue, which was carved in marble by the Piccirilli brothers. Jules Guérin painted the interior murals, and the epitaph above the statue was written by Royal Cortissoz. Dedicated on May 30, 1922, it is one of several memorials built to honor an American president. It has been a major tourist attraction since its opening, and over the years, has occasionally been used as a symbolic center focused on race relations and civil rights.

Doric style columns line the temple exterior, and the inscriptions inside include two well-known speeches by Lincoln, the Gettysburg Address, and his second inaugural address. The memorial has been the site of many famous speeches, including Martin Luther King Jr.'s "I Have a Dream" speech delivered on August 28, 1963, during the rally at the end of the March on Washington for Jobs and Freedom.

Like other monuments on the National Mall, including the nearby Desert Shield and Desert Storm Memorial, Vietnam Veterans Memorial, Korean War Veterans Memorial, and World War II Memorial, the Lincoln Memorial is administered by the National Park Service under its National Mall and Memorial Parks group. It has been listed on the National Register of Historic Places since October 15, 1966, and was ranked seventh on the American Institute of Architects' 2007 list of America's Favorite Architecture. The memorial is open to the public 24 hours a day, and more than seven million people visit it annually.

== History ==
=== Construction and dedication ===
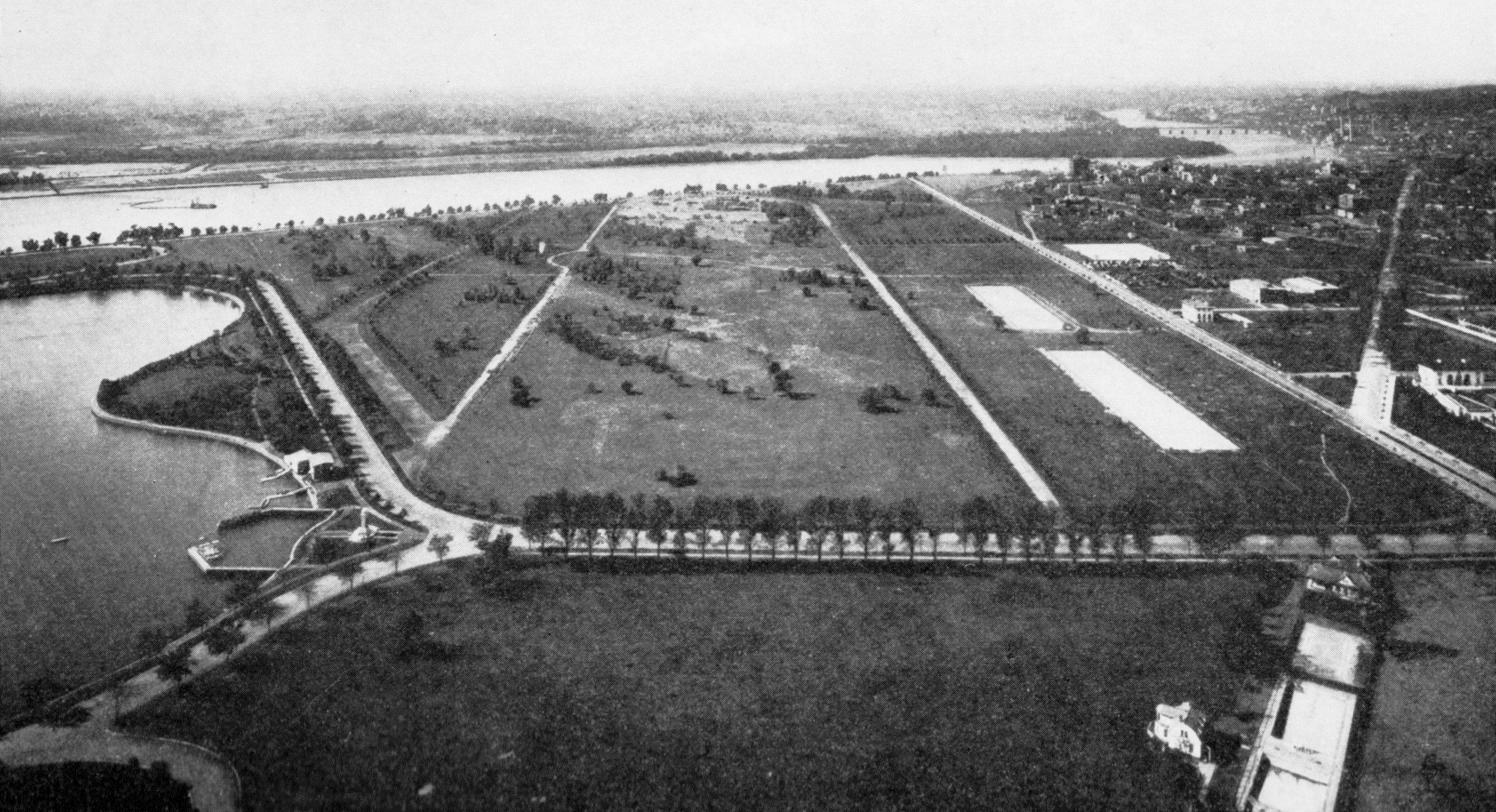
West Potomac Park prior to the memorial's construction, c. 1912

The first public memorial to U.S. president Abraham Lincoln in Washington, D.C., was a statue by Lot Flannery erected in front of the District of Columbia City Hall in 1868, three years after Lincoln's assassination in Ford's Theatre. Demands for a fitting national memorial had been voiced since the time of Lincoln's death. In 1867, Congress passed the first of many bills incorporating a commission to erect a monument for the sixteenth president. An American sculptor, Clark Mills, was chosen to design the monument. His plans reflected the nationalistic spirit of the time and called for a 70-foot (21 m) structure adorned with six equestrian and 31 pedestrian statues of colossal proportions, crowned by a 12-foot (3.7 m) statue of Abraham Lincoln. Subscriptions for the project were insufficient.

The matter lay dormant until the start of the 20th century, when, under the leadership of Senator Shelby M. Cullom of Illinois, six separate bills were introduced in Congress for the incorporation of a new memorial commission. The first five bills, proposed in the years 1901, 1902, and 1908, met with defeat because of opposition from Speaker Joe Cannon. The sixth bill (Senate Bill 9449), introduced on December 13, 1910, passed. The Lincoln Memorial Commission met for the first time the following year and President William H. Taft was chosen as the commission's president. Progress continued steadily, and in 1913 Congress approved the commission's choice of design and location.

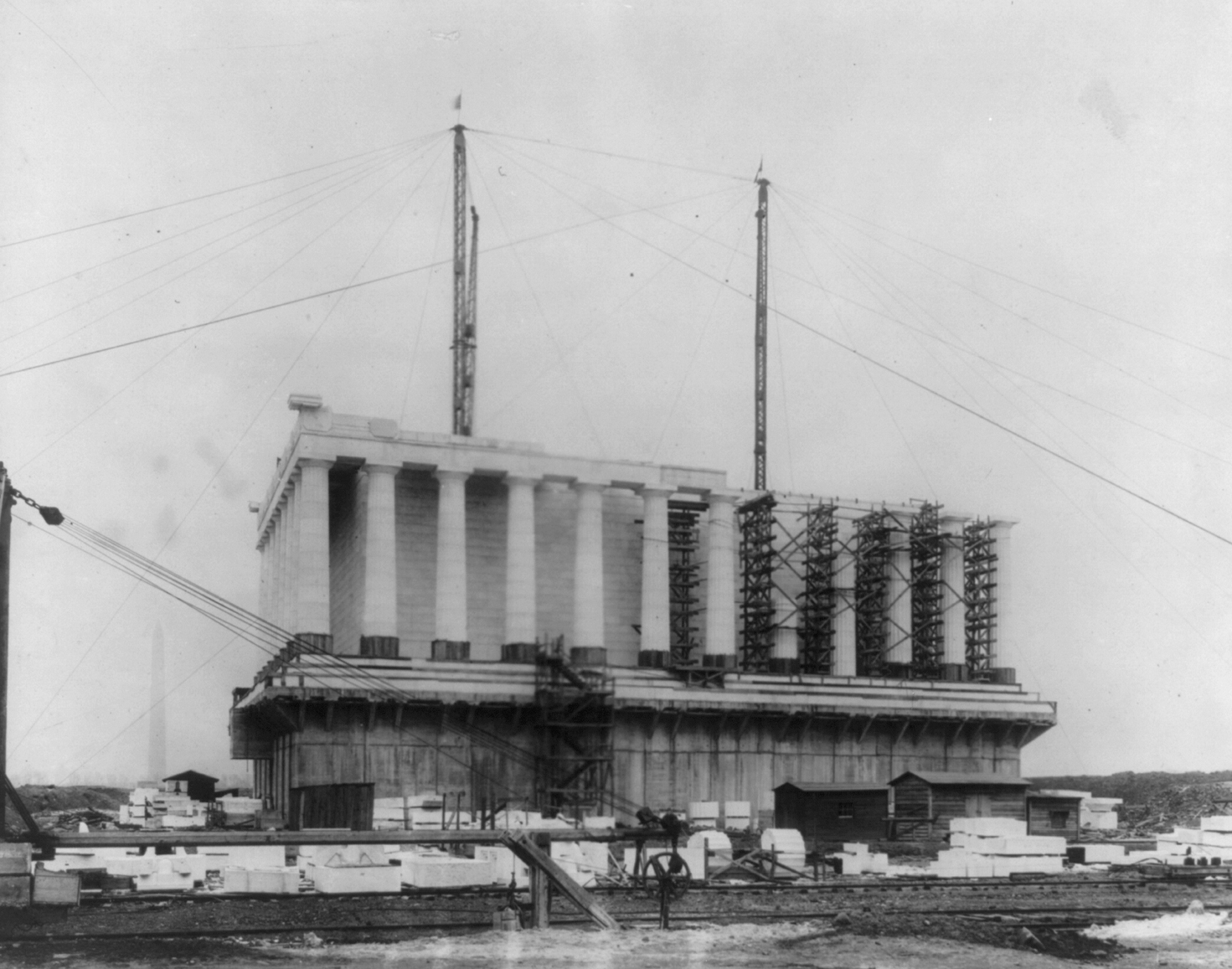
The memorial under construction in July 1916

There were questions regarding the commission's plan. Many thought architect Henry Bacon's Greek temple design was far too ostentatious for a man of Lincoln's humble character. Instead, they proposed a simple log cabin shrine. The site too did not go unopposed. The recently reclaimed land in West Potomac Park was seen by many as either too swampy or too inaccessible. Other sites, such as Washington Union Station, were put forth, but the commission stood firm in its recommendation, feeling that the Potomac Park location, situated on the axis connecting the Washington Monument and Capitol, overlooking the Potomac River and surrounded by open land, was ideal. Furthermore, the Potomac Park site was already designated in the McMillan Plan of 1901 to be the location of a future monument comparable to that of the Washington Monument.

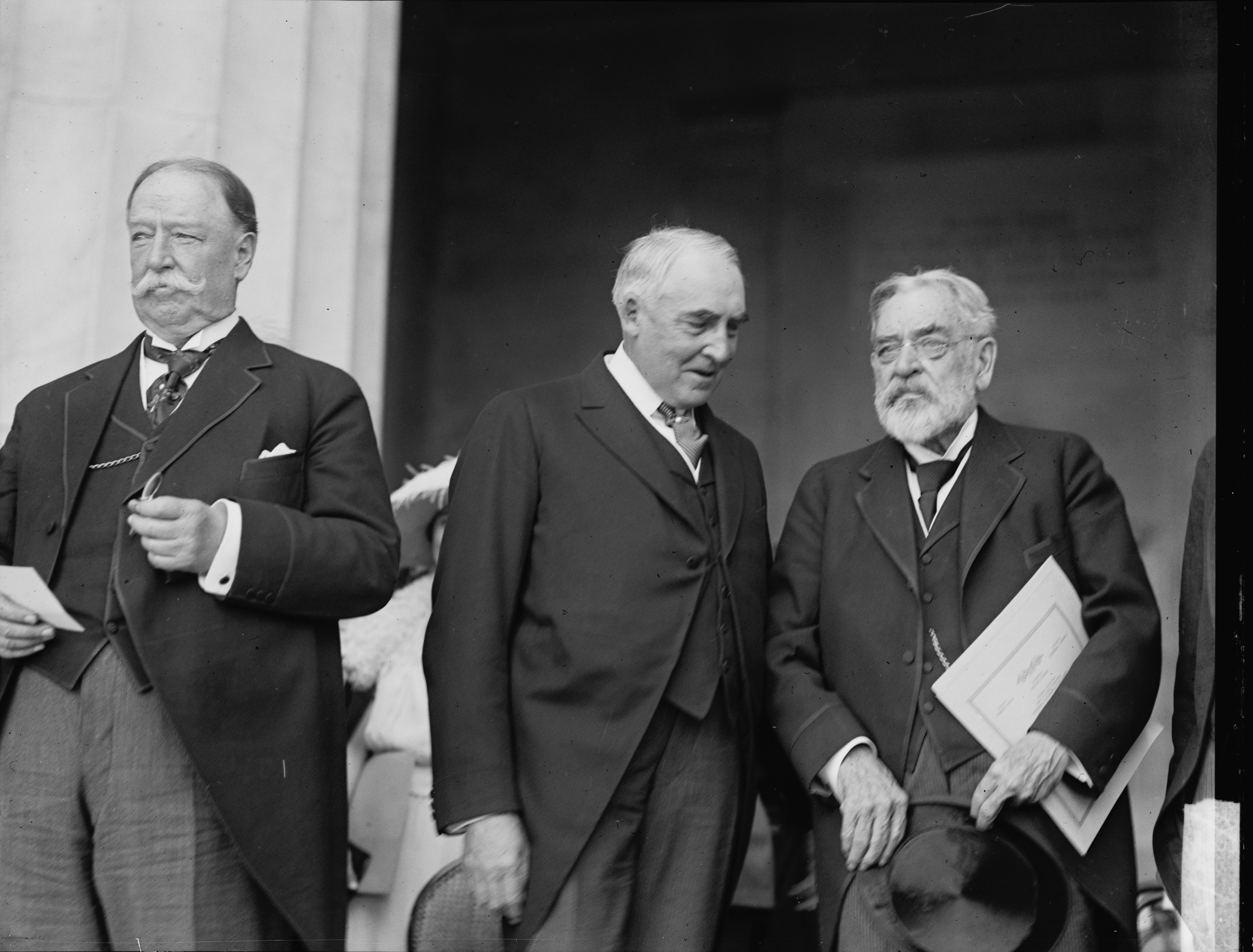
Chief Justice William Howard Taft, President Warren G. Harding, and Lincoln's eldest son, Robert Todd Lincoln, at the memorial's dedication on May 30, 1922

With Congressional approval and a $300,000 allocation, the project got underway. On February 12, 1914, contractor M. F. Comer of Toledo, Ohio; resident member of the memorial's commission, former Senator Joseph C. S. Blackburn of Kentucky; and the memorial's designer, Henry Bacon, conducted a groundbreaking ceremony by turning over a few spadefuls of earth. The following month is when actual construction began. Work progressed steadily according to schedule. Some changes were made to the plan. The statue of Lincoln, originally designed to be 10 feet (3.0 m) tall, was enlarged to 19 feet (5.8 m) to prevent it from being overwhelmed by the huge chamber. As late as 1920, the decision was made to substitute an open portal for the bronze and glass grille which was to have guarded the entrance. Despite these changes, the Memorial was finished on schedule. Commission president William H. Taft – who was then Chief Justice of the United States – dedicated the Memorial on May 30, 1922, and presented it to President Warren G. Harding, who accepted it on behalf of the American people. Lincoln's only surviving son, 78-year-old Robert Todd Lincoln, was in attendance. Prominent African Americans were invited to the event and discovered upon arrival they were assigned a segregated section guarded by U.S. Marines, a policy implemented by director of the Office of Public Buildings and Grounds, Lieutenant Colonel Clarence O. Sherrill.

=== Subsequent history ===
The Memorial has become a symbolically important venue, especially for its connection to the Civil Rights Movement. In 1939, the Daughters of the American Revolution refused to allow the African-American contralto Marian Anderson to perform before an integrated audience at the organization's Constitution Hall. At the suggestion of Eleanor Roosevelt, the wife of President Franklin D. Roosevelt, Harold L. Ickes, the Secretary of the Interior, arranged for a performance on the steps of the Lincoln Memorial on Easter Sunday of that year, to a live audience of 75,000 and a nationwide radio audience. On June 29, 1947, Harry Truman became the first president to address the National Association for the Advancement of Colored People (NAACP). The speech took place at the Lincoln Memorial during the NAACP convention and was carried nationally on radio. In that speech, Truman laid out the need to end discrimination, which would be advanced by the first comprehensive, presidentially proposed civil rights legislation.

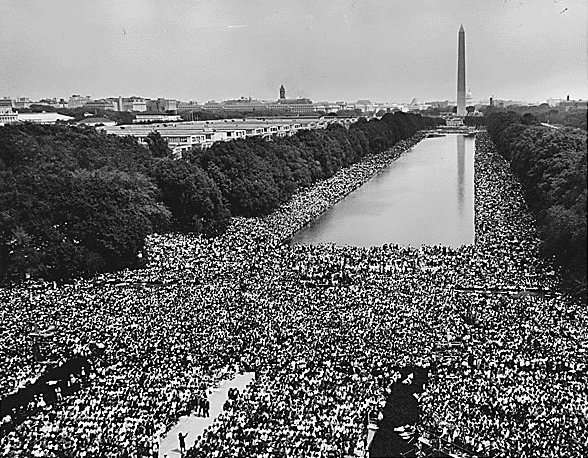
The March on Washington in 1963 brought 250,000 people to the National Mall and is famous for Martin Luther King Jr.'s "I Have a Dream" speech.

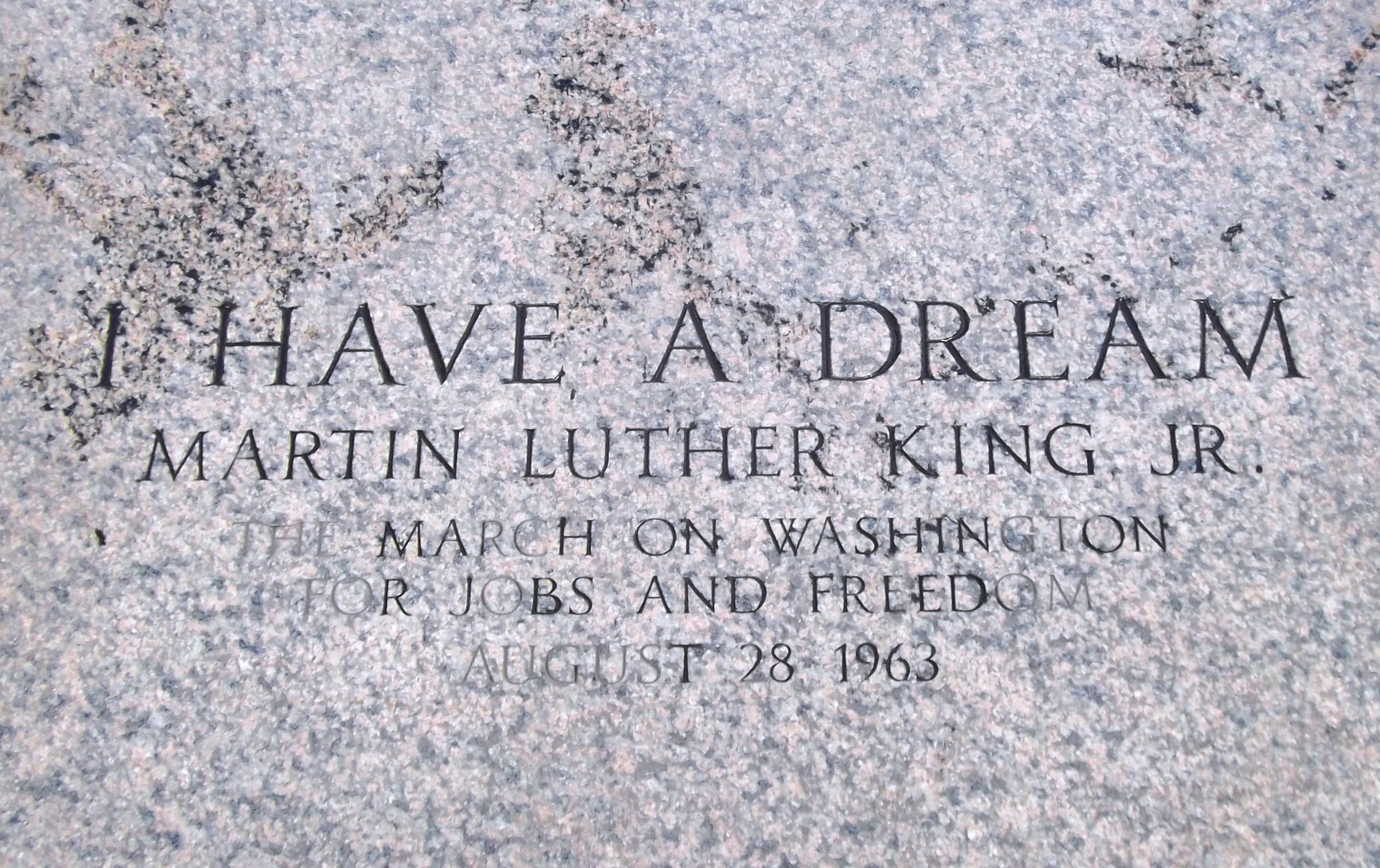
The location on the steps where King delivered the speech is commemorated with this inscription.

On August 28, 1963, the memorial grounds were the site of the March on Washington for Jobs and Freedom, which proved to be a high point of the American Civil Rights Movement. It is estimated that approximately 250,000 people came to the event, where they heard Martin Luther King Jr., deliver his historic "I Have a Dream" speech before the memorial honoring the president who issued the Emancipation Proclamation 100 years earlier. King's speech, with its language of patriotism and its evocation of Lincoln's Gettysburg Address, was meant to match the symbolism of the Lincoln Memorial as a monument to national unity. Labor leader Walter Reuther, an organizer of the march, persuaded the other organizers to move the march to the Lincoln Memorial from the Capitol Building. Reuther believed the location would be less threatening to Congress and that the occasion would be especially appropriate underneath the gaze of Abraham Lincoln's statue. The D.C. police also appreciated the location because it was surrounded on three sides by water, so that any incident could be easily contained.

The Memorial was listed on the National Register of Historic Places on October 15, 1966. At the memorial on May 9, 1970, President Richard Nixon had a middle-of-the-night impromptu, brief meeting with protesters who, just days after the Kent State shootings, were preparing to march against the Vietnam War.

On August 28, 1983, crowds gathered again to mark the 20th Anniversary Mobilization for Jobs, Peace and Freedom, to reflect on progress in gaining civil rights for African Americans and to commit to correcting continuing injustices. King's speech is such a part of the Lincoln Memorial story, that the spot on which King stood, on the landing eighteen steps below Lincoln's statue, was engraved in 2003 in recognition of the 40th anniversary of the event.

== Exterior ==
The exterior of the Memorial echoes a classic Greek temple and features Yule marble quarried from Colorado. The structure measures 189.7 by 118.5 feet (57.8 by 36.1 m) and is 99 feet (30 m) tall. It is surrounded by a peristyle of 36 fluted Doric columns, one for each of the 36 states in the Union at the time of Lincoln's death, and two columns in-antis at the entrance behind the colonnade. The columns stand 44 feet (13 m) tall with a base diameter of 7.5 feet (2.3 m). Each column is built from 12 drums including the capital. The columns, like the exterior walls and facades, are inclined slightly toward the building's interior. This is to compensate for perspective distortions which would otherwise make the memorial appear to bulge out at the top when compared with the bottom, a common feature of Ancient Greek architecture.

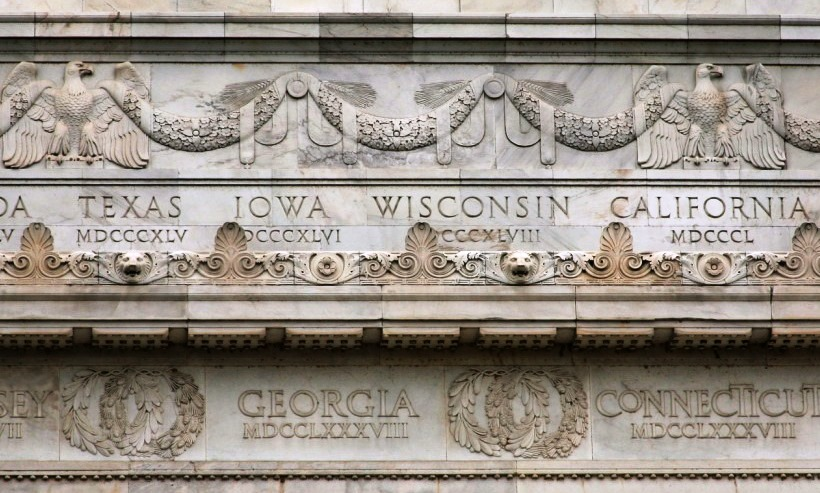
Detail of the memorial's friezes

Above the colonnade, inscribed on the frieze, are the names of the 36 states in the Union at the time of Lincoln's death and the dates in which they entered the Union. (Note: The date for Ohio was incorrectly entered as 1802, as opposed to the correct year, 1803.) Their names are separated by double wreath medallions in bas-relief. The cornice is composed of a carved scroll regularly interspersed with projecting lions' heads and ornamented with palmetto cresting along the upper edge. Above this on the attic frieze are inscribed the names of the 48 states present at the time of the Memorial's dedication. A bit higher is a garland joined by ribbons and palm leaves, supported by the wings of eagles. All ornamentation on the friezes and cornices was done by Ernest C. Bairstow.

The Memorial is anchored in a concrete foundation, 44 to 66 feet (13 to 20 m) in depth, constructed by M. F. Comer and Company and the National Foundation and Engineering Company, and is encompassed by a 187-by-257-foot (57 by 78 m) rectangular granite retaining wall measuring 14 feet (4.3 m) in height.

Leading up to the shrine on the east side are the main steps. Beginning at the edge of the Reflecting Pool, the steps rise to the Lincoln Memorial Circle roadway surrounding the edifice, then to the main portal, intermittently spaced with a series of platforms. Flanking the steps as they approach the entrance are two buttresses each crowned with an 11-foot (3.4 m) tall tripod carved from pink Tennessee marble by the Piccirilli Brothers. There are a total of 87 steps (58 steps from the chamber to the plaza and 29 steps from the plaza to the Reflecting Pool). The number of steps matches the phrase from Lincoln's Gettysburg Address, "four score and seven years".

== Interior ==
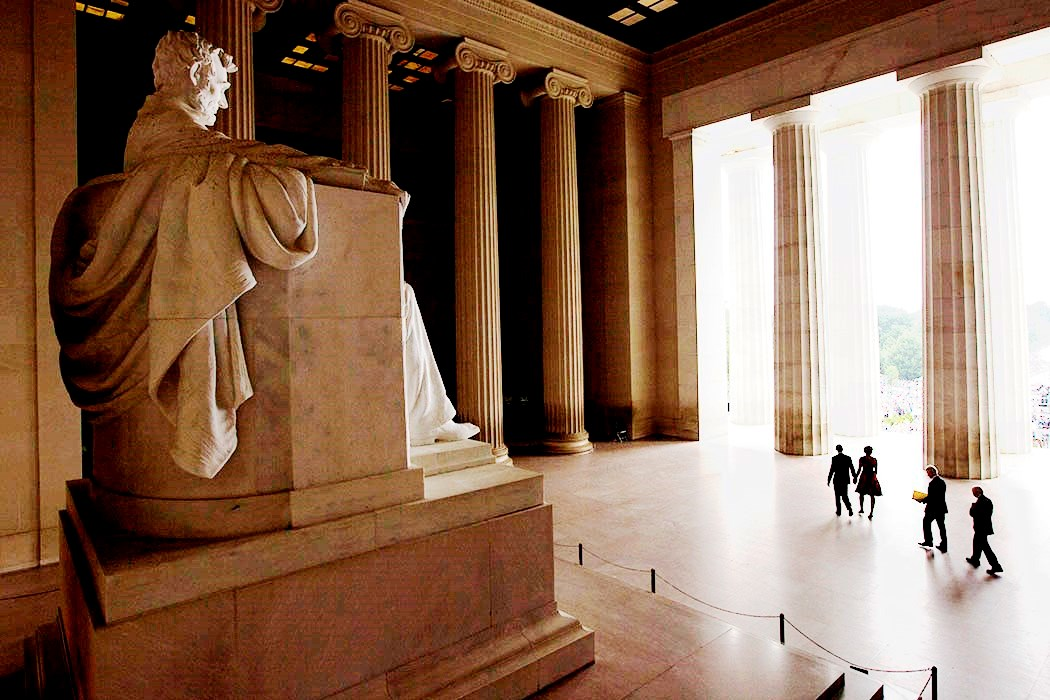
President Barack Obama, First Lady Michelle Obama, and former presidents Jimmy Carter and Bill Clinton walk past President Lincoln's statue to participate in the 2013 50th anniversary ceremony of the historic March on Washington and Martin Luther King Jr.'s "I Have a Dream" speech

The Memorial's interior is divided into three chambers by two rows of four Ionic columns, each 50 feet (15 m) tall and 5.5 feet (1.7 m) at their base. The central chamber, housing the statue of Lincoln, is 60 feet (18 m) wide, 74 feet (23 m) deep, and 60 feet (18 m) high. The north and south chambers display carved inscriptions of Lincoln's second inaugural address and his Gettysburg Address. (Note: In the line from the second inaugural, "With high hope for the future," the F in FUTURE was carved as an E. To obscure this error the spurious bottom line of the E is not painted in with black paint.) Bordering these inscriptions are pilasters ornamented with fasces, eagles, and wreaths. The inscriptions and adjoining ornamentation are by Evelyn Beatrice Longman.

The Memorial is replete with symbolic elements. The 36 columns represent the states of the Union at the time of Lincoln's death; the 48 stone festoons above the columns represent the 48 states in 1922. Inside, each inscription is surmounted by a 60-by-12-foot (18.3 by 3.7 m) mural by Jules Guérin portraying principles seen as evident in Lincoln's life: Freedom, Liberty, Morality, Justice, and the Law on the south wall; Unity, Fraternity, and Charity on the north. Cypress trees, representing Eternity, are in the murals' backgrounds. The murals' paint incorporated kerosene and wax to protect the exposed artwork from fluctuations in temperature and moisture.

The ceiling consists of bronze girders ornamented with laurel and oak leaves. Between these are panels of Alabama marble, saturated with paraffin to increase translucency. But feeling that the statue required even more light, Bacon and French designed metal slats for the ceiling to conceal floodlights, which could be modulated to supplement the natural light; this modification was installed in 1929. The one major alteration since was the addition of an elevator for the disabled in the 1970s.

=== Statue ===
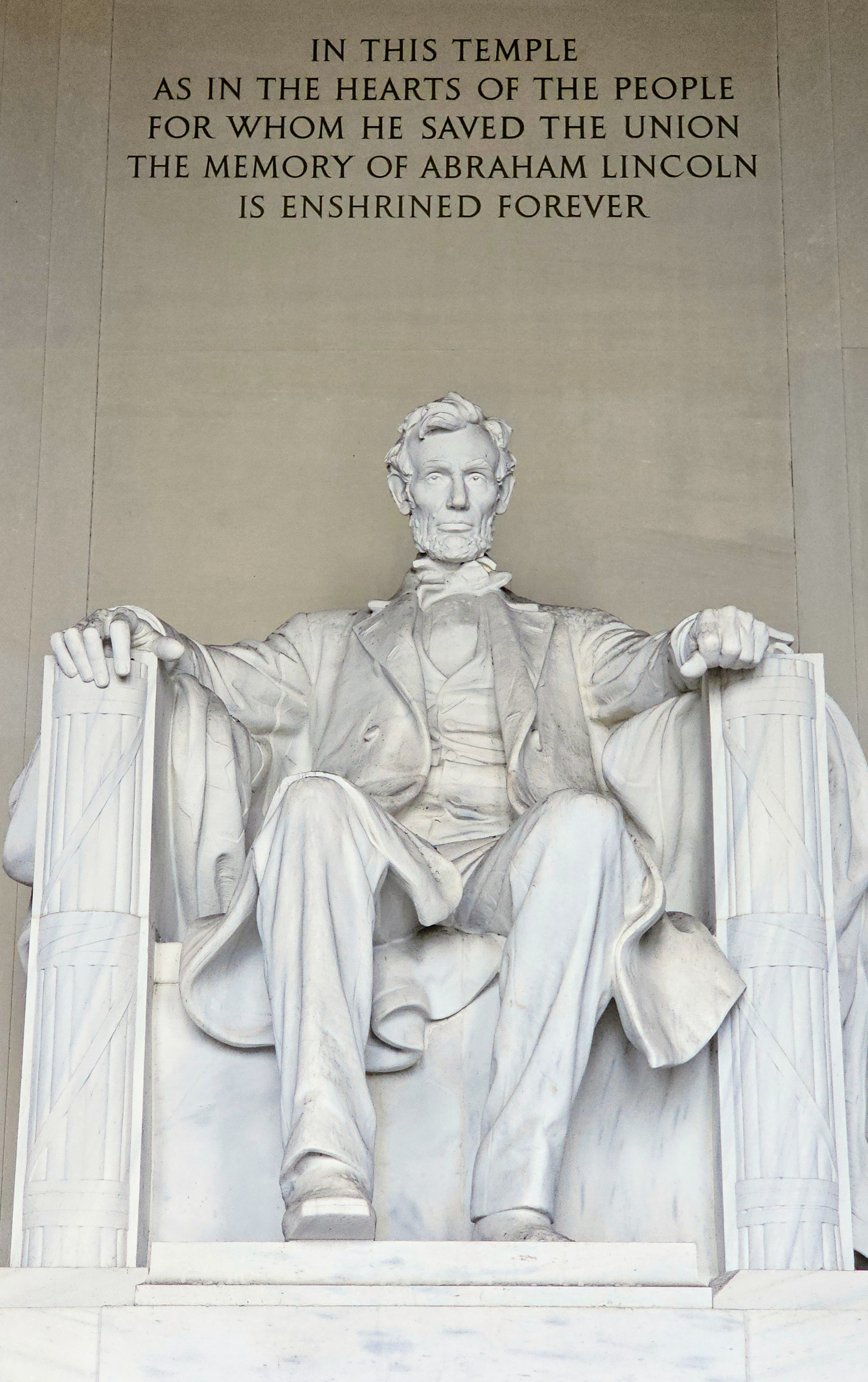
Abraham Lincoln, by Daniel Chester French, in 1920

Lying between the north and south chambers of the open-air Memorial is the central hall, which contains the large solitary figure of Abraham Lincoln sitting in contemplation. Its sculptor, Daniel Chester French, supervised the six Piccirilli brothers (Ferruccio, Attilio, Furio, Masaniello, Orazio, and Getulio) through the four years of its creation.

The 175-short-ton (159 t) statue, carved from Georgia white marble, was shipped in 28 pieces. Originally intended to be only 10 feet (3.0 m) tall, the sculpture was enlarged to 19 feet (5.8 m) from head to foot considering it would look small within the extensive interior space. If Lincoln were depicted standing, he would be 28 feet (8.5 m) tall.

The widest span of the statue corresponds to its height, and it rests upon an oblong pedestal of Tennessee marble 10 feet (3.0 m) high, 16 feet (4.9 m) wide, and 17 feet (5.2 m) deep. Beneath the pedestal lies a platform of Tennessee marble about 34.5 feet (10.5 m) long, 28 feet (8.5 m) wide, and 6.5 inches (0.17 m) high. Lincoln's arms rest on representations of Roman fasces. The statue is discreetly bordered by two pilasters, one on each side. Between these pilasters, and above Lincoln's head, is engraved an epitaph of Lincoln by Royal Cortissoz.

IN THIS TEMPLE
AS IN THE HEARTS OF THE PEOPLE
FOR WHOM HE SAVED THE UNION
THE MEMORY OF ABRAHAM LINCOLN
IS ENSHRINED FOREVER

—Epitaph by Royal Cortissoz

==== Speculation about sculptural features ====
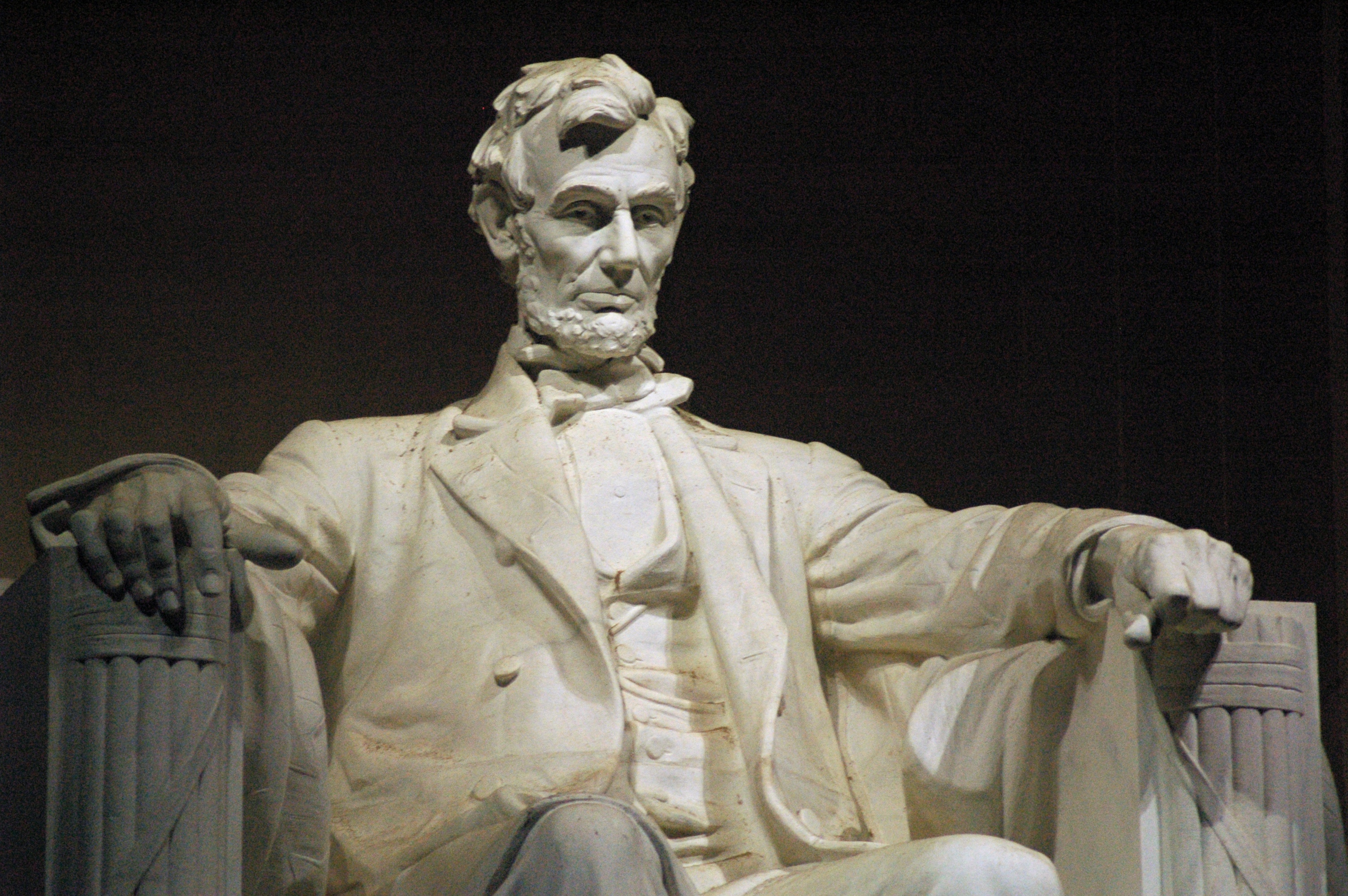
The sculptor's possible use of sign language is speculated, since the statue's left hand forms an "A" while the right hand portrays an "L".

An urban legend holds that the face of General Robert E. Lee is carved onto the back of Lincoln's head, and looks back across the Potomac toward his former home, Arlington House (now within the bounds of Arlington National Cemetery). Another popular legend is that Lincoln's hands are shown using sign language to represent his initials, his left hand signing an A and his right signing an L. The National Park Service denies both legends.

However, historian Gerald Prokopowicz writes that, while it is not clear that sculptor Daniel Chester French intended Lincoln's hands to be formed into sign language versions of his initials, it is possible that French did intend it. French was familiar with American Sign Language, and he would have had a reason to do so, to pay tribute to Lincoln for having signed the federal legislation giving Gallaudet University, a university for the deaf, the authority to grant college degrees. The National Geographic Society's publication "Pinpointing the Past in Washington, D.C." states that Daniel Chester French had a son who was deaf and that the sculptor was familiar with sign language. Historian James A. Percoco has observed that, although there are no extant documents showing that French had Lincoln's hands carved to represent the letters "A" and "L" in American Sign Language, "I think you can conclude that it's reasonable to have that kind of summation about the hands."

=== Undercroft ===
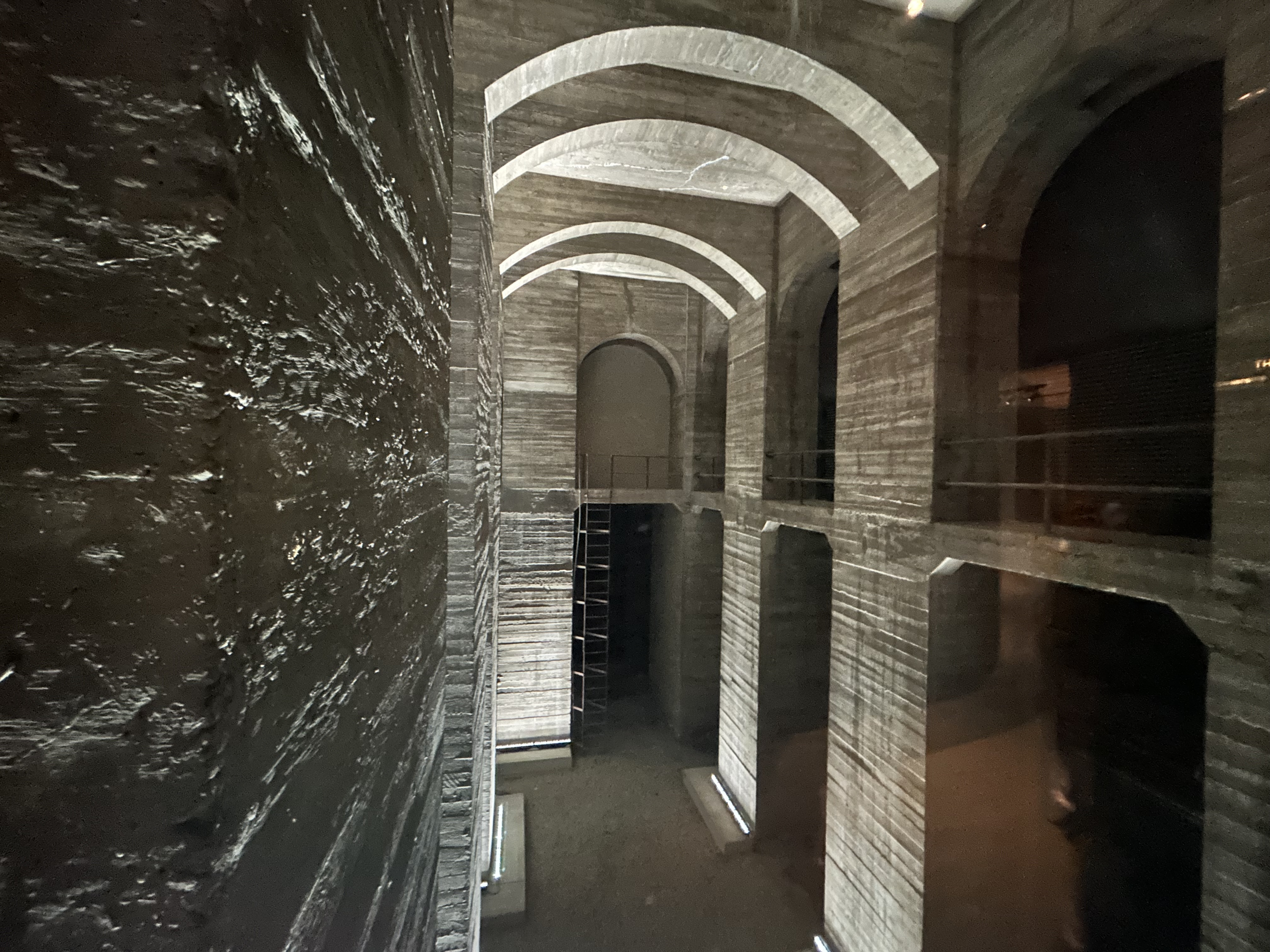
The Lincoln Memorial Undercroft

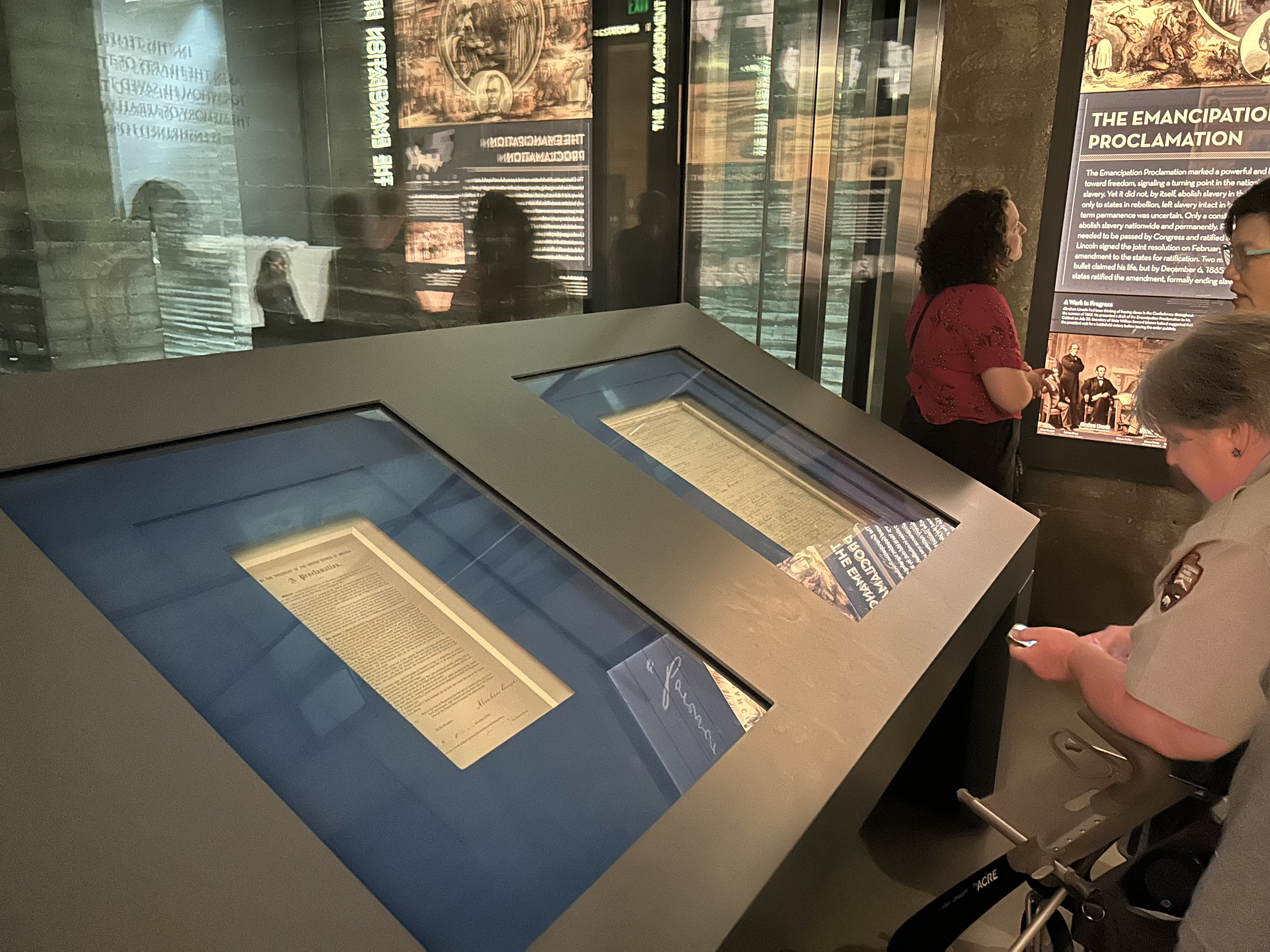
Copies of the Thirteenth Amendment and Emancipation Proclamation, signed by Lincoln, on display in the Undercroft.

Below the memorial is an undercroft. During construction, graffiti was scrawled on it by workers, which the National Park Service refers to as "historic graffiti." During the 1970s and 1980s, there were regular tours of the undercroft. The tours stopped abruptly in 1989 after a visitor noticed asbestos and notified the Service. Due to water seeping through the calcium carbonate within the marble, over time stalactites and stalagmites have formed within it.

For the memorial's centennial in 2022, the undercroft was planned to be open to visitors following a rehabilitation project funded by David Rubenstein. Work started on the $69 million project in 2023 with expected completion by 2026.

Through the renovation, the undercroft will become a visitor area with a museum, theater, store and exhibit section. It is expected to only take up 15,000 square feet of the 50,000 square-foot undercroft. The plan, as of 2024, is for the space to include six floor-to-ceiling glass walls that will provide views of the cathedral-like interior of the undercroft, and an immersive theater presentation that will project images of historic events onto screens and the undercroft's pillars.

Copies of the Emancipation Proclamation and the Thirteenth Amendment, both signed by Lincoln, and lent by philanthropist Kenneth C. Griffin, will be on display from the undercroft's opening in 2026 until June 2027. They are not the original copies, but instead commemorative copies made for charities, then signed by Lincoln and other figures such as Thaddeus Stevens and Charles Sumner.

The Lincoln Memorial Undercroft museum opened to the public on June 25, 2026. Admission is free, though timed-entry reservations are required, with a reservation fee.

== In popular culture ==
As one of the most prominent American monuments, the Lincoln Memorial is often featured in books, films, videogames, and television shows that take place in Washington; by 2003 it had appeared in over 60 films, and in 2009, Mark S. Reinhart compiled some short sketches of dozens of uses of the Memorial in film and television.

Some examples of films include Frank Capra's 1939 film Mr. Smith Goes to Washington, where in a key scene the statue and the Memorial's inscription provide inspiration to freshman Senator Jefferson Smith, played by James Stewart. The Park Service did not want Capra to film at the Memorial, so he sent a large crew elsewhere as a distraction while a smaller crew filmed Stewart and Jean Arthur inside the Memorial.

Many of the appearances of the Lincoln Memorial are actually digital visual effects, due to restrictive filming rules. As of 2017, according to the National Park Service, "Filming/photography is prohibited above the white marble steps and the interior chamber of the Lincoln Memorial." Another notable example can be found in the television series The Handmaid's Tale, where both the statue and the Memorial's inscription appear to be defaced and destroyed, achieved through digital and visual effects.

Mitchell Newton-Matza said in 2016 that "Reflecting its cherished place in the hearts of Americans, the Lincoln Memorial has often been featured prominently in popular culture, especially motion pictures." According to Tracey Gold Bennett, "The majesty of the Lincoln Memorial is a big draw for film location scouts, producers, and directors because this landmark has appeared in a considerable number of films."

Jay Sacher writes:

From high to low, the memorial is cultural shorthand for both American ideals and 1960s radicalism. From Forrest Gump's Zelig-like insertion into anti-war rallies on the steps of the memorial, to the villainous Decepticon robots discarding the Lincoln statue and claiming it as a throne. ... The memorial's place in the culture is assured even as it is parodied.

=== Depictions on U.S. currency ===
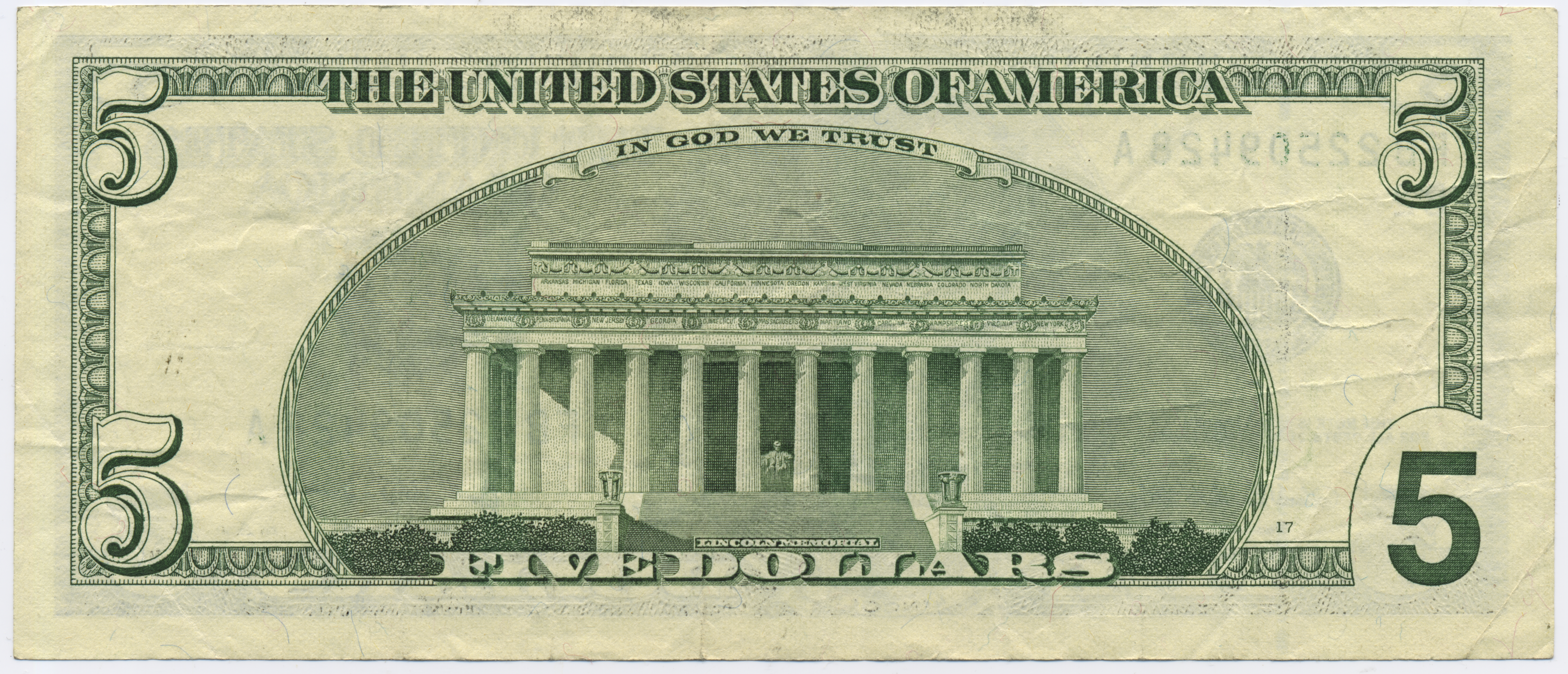
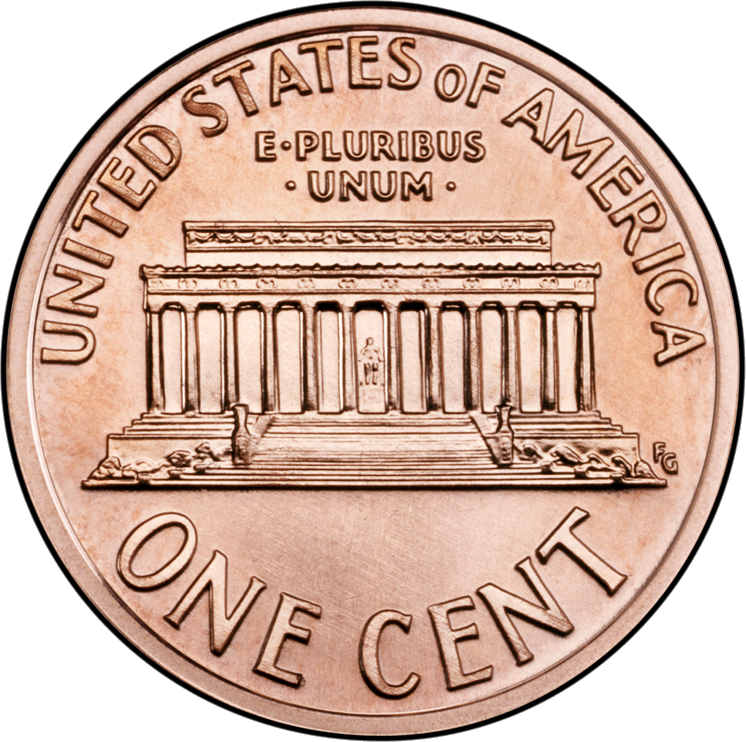
Reverse of a 2003 United States five-dollar bill and 2006 Lincoln cent

From 1959 (the 150th anniversary of Lincoln's birth) to 2008, the memorial, with statue visible through the columns, was depicted on the reverse of the United States one-cent coin, which since 1909 has depicted a bust of Lincoln on its front.

The memorial has appeared on the back of the U.S. five-dollar bill since 1929. The front of the bill bears Lincoln's portrait.

== See also ==
- Cultural depictions of Abraham Lincoln
- Architecture of Washington, D.C.
- List of areas in the United States National Park System
- List of national memorials of the United States
- National Register of Historic Places listings in the District of Columbia
- Presidential memorials in the United States
