= Royal Cortissoz =

19th and 20th-century American art historian

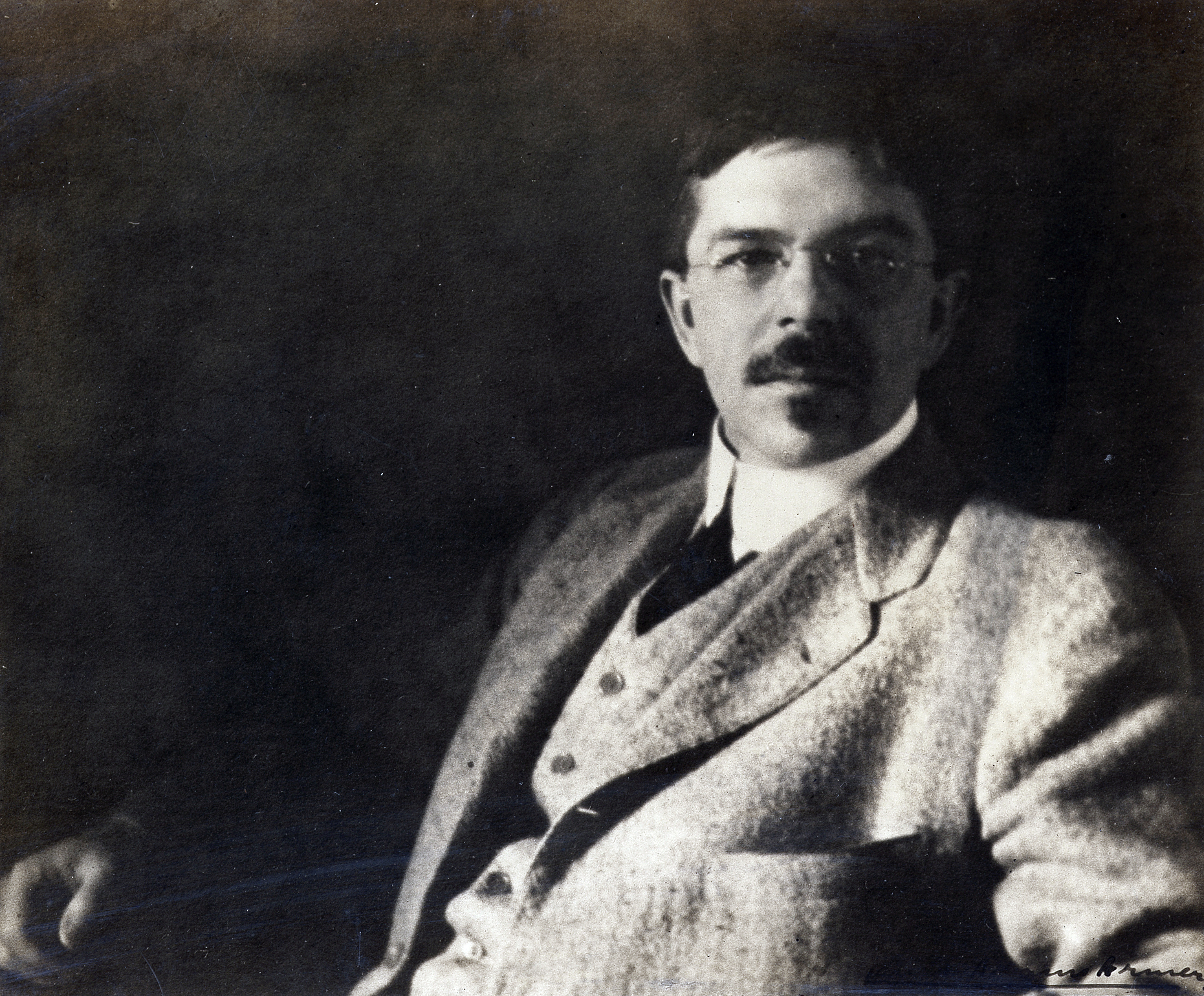
Royal Cortissoz, 1920

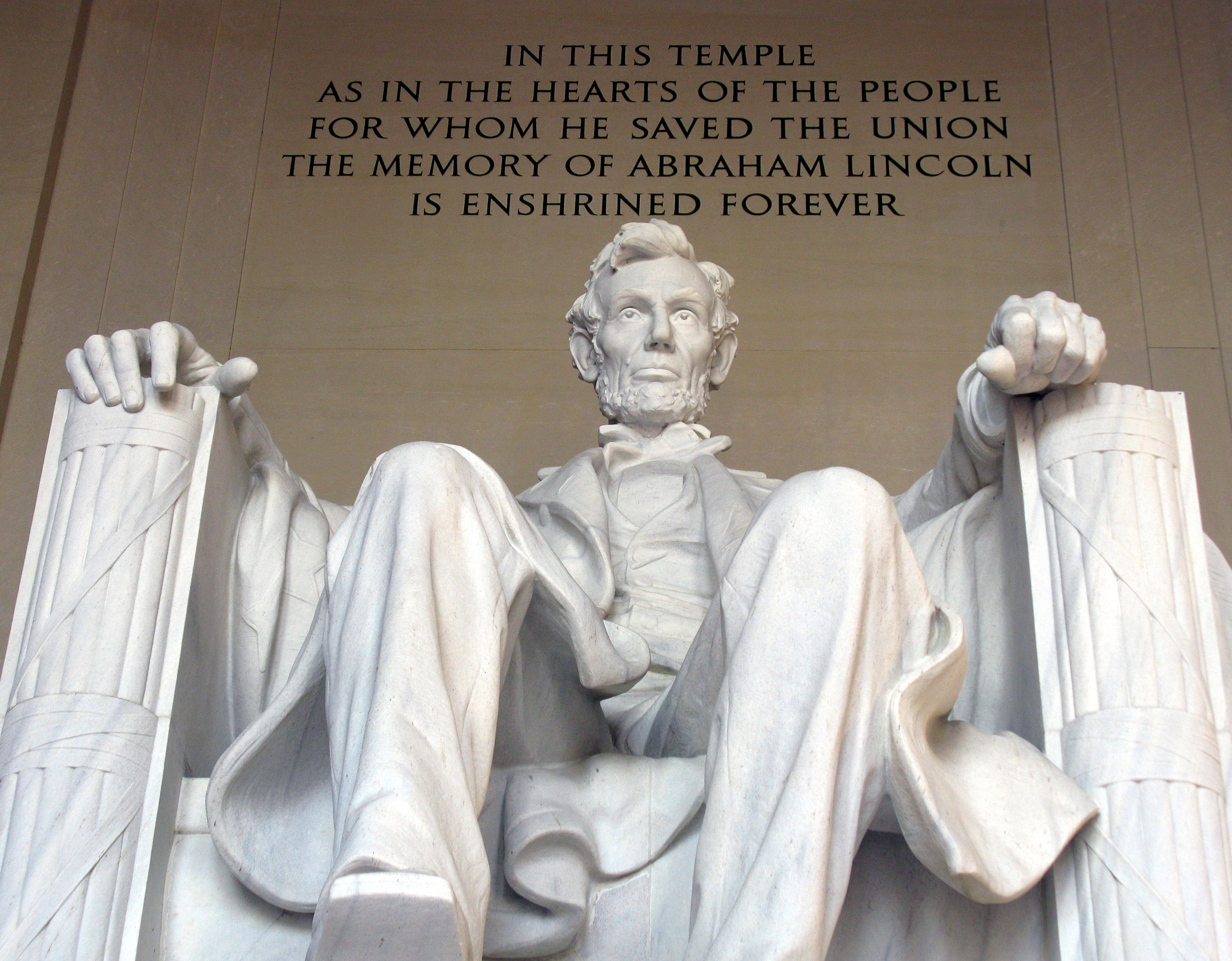
Cortissoz wrote the epitaph carved above the Abraham Lincoln statue in the Lincoln Memorial

Royal Cortissoz (/kɔːrˈtiːzəs/; February 10, 1869 – October 17, 1948) was an American art historian and, from 1891 until his death, the art critic for the New York Herald Tribune. During his tenure at the newspaper, he consistently championed traditionalism and decried modernism. Of the latter, he once wrote, "It will someday prove a kind of Victorian 'dud', with a difference, obviously, but a 'dud' just the same."

Cortissoz wrote the inscription engraved above the statue of Abraham Lincoln in the Lincoln Memorial in Washington, D.C.: "In this temple, as in the hearts of the people for whom he saved the Union, the memory of Abraham Lincoln is enshrined forever."

== Early life ==
Cortissoz was born in Brooklyn, New York, to Francisco Emmanuel Cortissoz, an Englishman of Spanish descent, and Julia da Costa Mauri, from Martinique. He trained as an architect, spending six years working at the firm of McKim, Mead, and White, starting at the age of 16, before joining the staff of the Commercial Advertiser. In 1891, he joined the staff of the New York Tribune, writing on culture, and eventually became the art editor. He had been interested in art as a young child, but never formally studied or practiced it, instead having skill with words, thus leading to career as an art critic, in his own words, "by spontaneous combustion". However, the hectic life of a journalist and the pressure of trying to establish the Tribune as a cultural leader led to a mental breakdown, or neurasthenia as he was diagnosed. Although he soon recovered after a trip around Cape Horn, he suffered from anxiety and psychosomatic ailments for the remainder of his life.

== Work as a critic ==
As a critic, Cortissoz saw his role to be one who fosters an appreciation of art in the common man, and not just paintings. He wrote extensively about jewelry, rare book designs, architecture, furniture, and interior design. He considered art as a whole to be central to society's well-being. He also frequently remarked that beauty could be found anywhere. Cortissoz was so influential that his praise was eagerly sought by artists, and the organizers of the landmark 1913 Armory Show were worried about what he might think.

Cortissoz argued against modernism on both technical and cultural grounds. He found abstract art to be ugly and rejected modernism's idea that the work did not have to represent reality. In 1923, he drew a comparison between the surge of prominent European modernists arriving on American shores with the hot button issue of immigration, coining the derisive term "Ellis Island art" in an attempt to denigrate the newcomers' rising status in the art world. (The term did not catch on.) He also detested modernists' tendency to be dismissive of the past and of those who disliked their work. This attitude, Cortissoz felt, would cause people to associate art with the irrational and bizarre and thus lose interest. Over the years, Cortissoz criticized in this manner Cubism, German Expressionism, Dada, Surrealism, and abstract expressionism. He felt artists attached to these movements, such as Pablo Picasso, Henri Matisse, and Piet Mondrian were egotists. In 1927, he wrote, "Sooner or later these silly egotists will go to the scrap heap. But in the meantime they are ruining the younger generation." He did, however, have praise for American modernists who used traditional techniques, such as Arthur B. Davies, Guy Pène du Bois, and Georgia O'Keeffe.

== Personal life ==
In 1897, Cortissoz married Ellen MacKay Hutchinson, a literary editor at the Tribune. She died in August 1933, and the couple had no children. Cortissoz died of a heart ailment in Manhattan on October 17, 1948.

== Honors and affiliations ==
- D.H.L., Wesleyan University
- Chevalier, Order of Leopold
- Member, The American Academy of Arts and Letters
- Trustee, American Academy in Rome
- Honorary member, American Institute of Architects
- Honorary Fellow, Metropolitan Museum of Art
- Medal for distinguished service in the field of fine arts (1931), American Art Dealers Association

== Partial bibliography ==
- Augustus Saint-Gaudens (1907)
- John La Farge: A Memoir and a Study (1911)
- Art and Common Sense (1913)
- The Life of Whitelaw Reid (1921)
- American artists (1923)
- Personalities in Art (1924)
- The Painter's Craft (1930)
- Contemporary American Etching (1930)
- Arthur B. Davies (1931)
- Guy Pène du Bois (1931)

Source: Works by Royal Cortissoz in WorldCat
