= Lot Flannery =

Irish-American sculptor

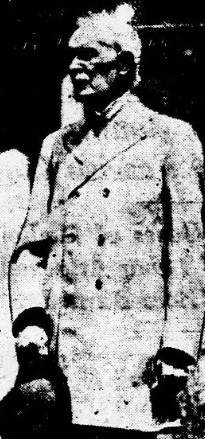
- Obituary photo in The Evening Star
- Born: 1836; Limerick, Ireland
- Died: December 19, 1922 (aged 85–86); Washington, D.C.
- Occupation: Sculptor
- Known for: Sculptor of Abraham Lincoln

Lot Flannery (1836–December 19, 1922) was an Irish-American sculptor from Washington, D.C., best known for his work in 1868 on the Abraham Lincoln statue located outside the District of Columbia City Hall and the nation's oldest extant memorial to the assassinated president.

== Biography ==
Flannery was born in Limerick, Ireland, but moved to the United States as a child. He displayed a talent for art and began studying the field in Washington, D.C. He focused his work on sculpture and traveled to Europe to further his studies. Flannery also spent time living in New Orleans, St. Louis, and New York City, but spent most of his life in Washington. He owned one of the largest stone carving businesses in Washington and specialized in carving tombstones.

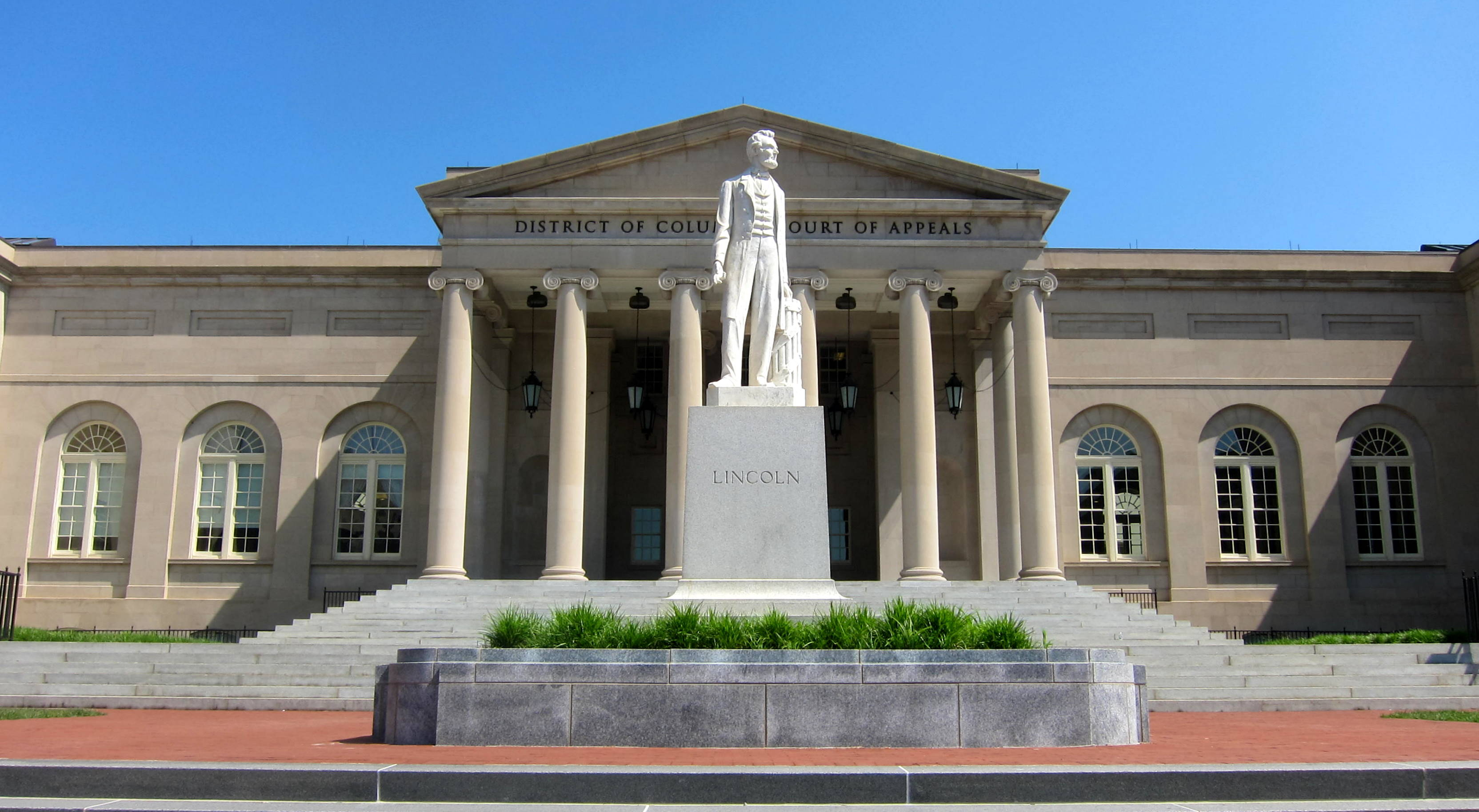
Lincoln statue by Flannery

Flannery knew President Abraham Lincoln and was at Ford's Theatre the night of the assassination. Shortly after Lincoln's death, Washingtonians chose to erect a memorial honoring the slain president. Many designs were submitted to the monument planning committee, but Flannery's model was unanimously chosen. The committee called his design the "most spirited" and "an excellent likeness." The memorial was dedicated on April 15, 1868, the third anniversary of Lincoln's death. Flannery's statue is the only statue of Lincoln created by someone who knew him.

In addition to the Lincoln sculpture, Flannery's notable works include the Arsenal Monument at Congressional Cemetery and a sculpture of President Chester Arthur on display at the Smithsonian American Art Museum. Flannery sculpted a marble bust of General John A. Logan that was previously exhibited in the Capitol. A copy of that bust made by artist Franklin Simmons was used in producing the equestrian sculpture Major General John A. Logan. Flannery never married and lived alone until his death at his residence on December 19, 1922.
