= Statue of Abraham Lincoln (District of Columbia City Hall) =

Statue by Lot Flannery in Washington, D.C., U.S.

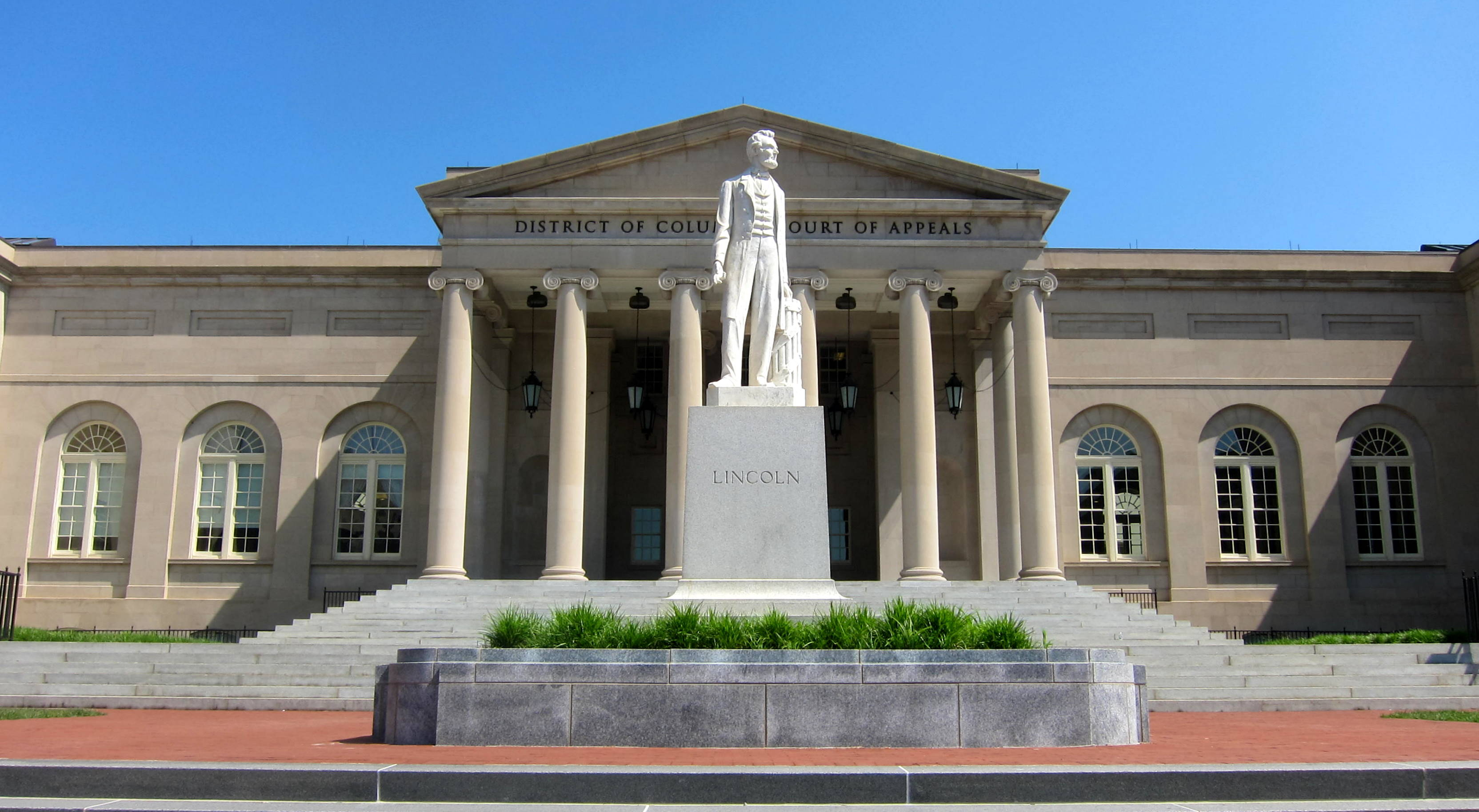
- Interactive map of Statue of Abraham Lincoln
- Location: 400 block of Indiana Ave NW Washington, D.C., U.S.
- Coordinates: 38.8949769°N 77.0175131°W
- Designer: Lot Flannery (sculptor); Frank G. Pierson (architect)
- Material: Marble (sculpture); Granite (base)
- Length: 2.5 feet (0.76 m)
- Width: 2.9 feet (0.88 m)
- Height: 7.3 feet (2.2 m)
- Opening date: April 15, 1868
- Dedicated to: Abraham Lincoln

Abraham Lincoln is a marble sculpture of U.S. President Abraham Lincoln by Irish artist Lot Flannery, located in front of the old District of Columbia City Hall in Washington, D.C., United States. The statue is the nation's oldest extant memorial to the president and was installed several blocks from Ford's Theatre, where Lincoln was assassinated. Flannery was present at the theater on the night of Lincoln's assassination.

Dedicated in 1868 on the third anniversary of Lincoln's death, dignitaries at the unveiling ceremony included President Andrew Johnson and Generals Ulysses S. Grant, William Tecumseh Sherman and Winfield Scott Hancock. The statue has been removed and rededicated twice. The first rededication was in 1923, following an outpouring of support from citizens and a veterans group that the statue be restored. The second rededication took place in 2009 after a three-year remodeling of the old City Hall. It previously stood on a column but now rests on top of an octagonal base.

== History ==
=== Background ===
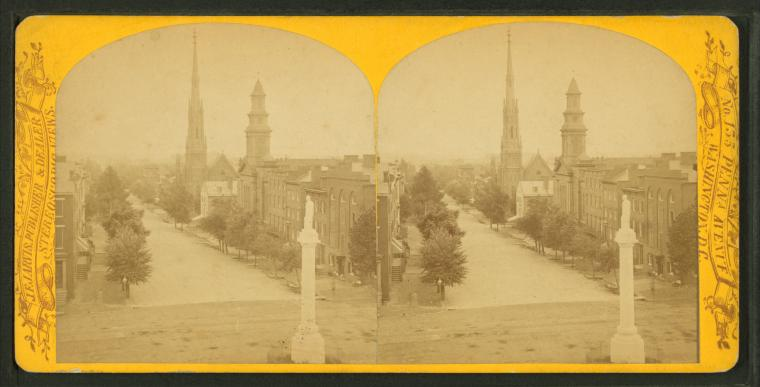

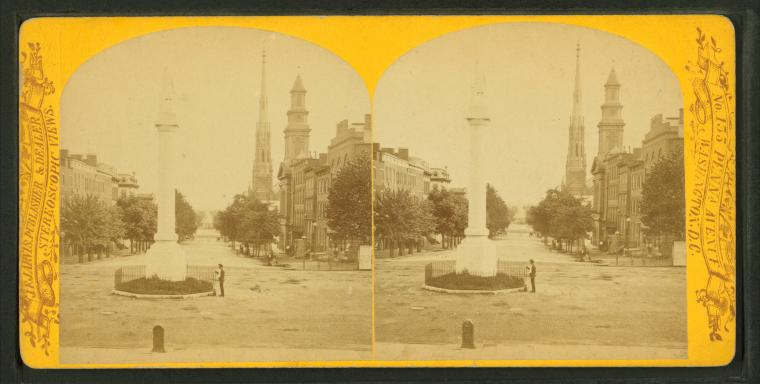
Stereoscopic views showing the statue c. 1868–1890

Most of the residents of Washington, D.C. were shocked and horrified by the assassination of Republican President Abraham Lincoln on April 14, 1865. Because of its geographical location, the city was sometimes suspected of being sympathetic to the Confederacy during the Civil War. Since Lincoln was killed in Washington, some of the residents worried Republican congressional leaders would seek revenge on the city. Thirteen days after Lincoln died, in an attempt to show loyalty, city and business leaders decided to erect a memorial honoring the slain president. It was the first Lincoln monument commissioned after his death, but not the first one built. In 1866, a plaster statue (later replaced by a metal one) of Lincoln was erected in San Francisco. It was destroyed during the firestorm that followed the 1906 earthquake.

The total cost of the memorial was $25,000. Washingtonians were responsible for most of the donations with the remaining funds raised by the Lincoln Monument Association. The largest donation came from John T. Ford, the manager of Ford's Theatre at the time of Lincoln's assassination. He held a benefit performance at his theater in Baltimore, raising $1,800. Although several designs were submitted, the monument's planning committee unanimously chose the model by Lot Flannery (1836–1922), a local Irish-American artist, calling it the "most spirited" and "an excellent likeness." Flannery had known Lincoln and was at Ford's Theatre the night of the assassination. His statue is the only statue of Lincoln created by someone who knew him. In addition to the Lincoln sculpture, Flannery's notable works include the Arsenal Monument at Congressional Cemetery and a sculpture of President Chester Arthur on display at the Smithsonian American Art Museum. Frank G. Pierson was chosen to be the monument's architect.

=== Dedication ===
On the evening of April 14, 1868, the Lincoln statue was moved from Flannery's studio to City Hall. Police guarded the covered statue so no one could see it before the dedication ceremony the following day. On April 15, all of the city's offices were closed at noon, and all flags were flown at half-staff. An estimated 20,000 people, around 20% of Washington's population, attended the dedication. Dignitaries at the dedication included President Andrew Johnson, General Ulysses S. Grant, General William Tecumseh Sherman, and General Winfield Scott Hancock. Supreme Court Justices and members of Congress were not in attendance because Johnson's impeachment trial was taking place. A Masonic ceremony, along with music and prayers, took place at the dedication before the main speech by Major General Benjamin Brown French. Following the speech, Washington mayor Richard Wallach introduced Johnson, who uncovered the statue. The crowd cheered, followed by more music and finally a benediction.

=== Removal and rededications ===
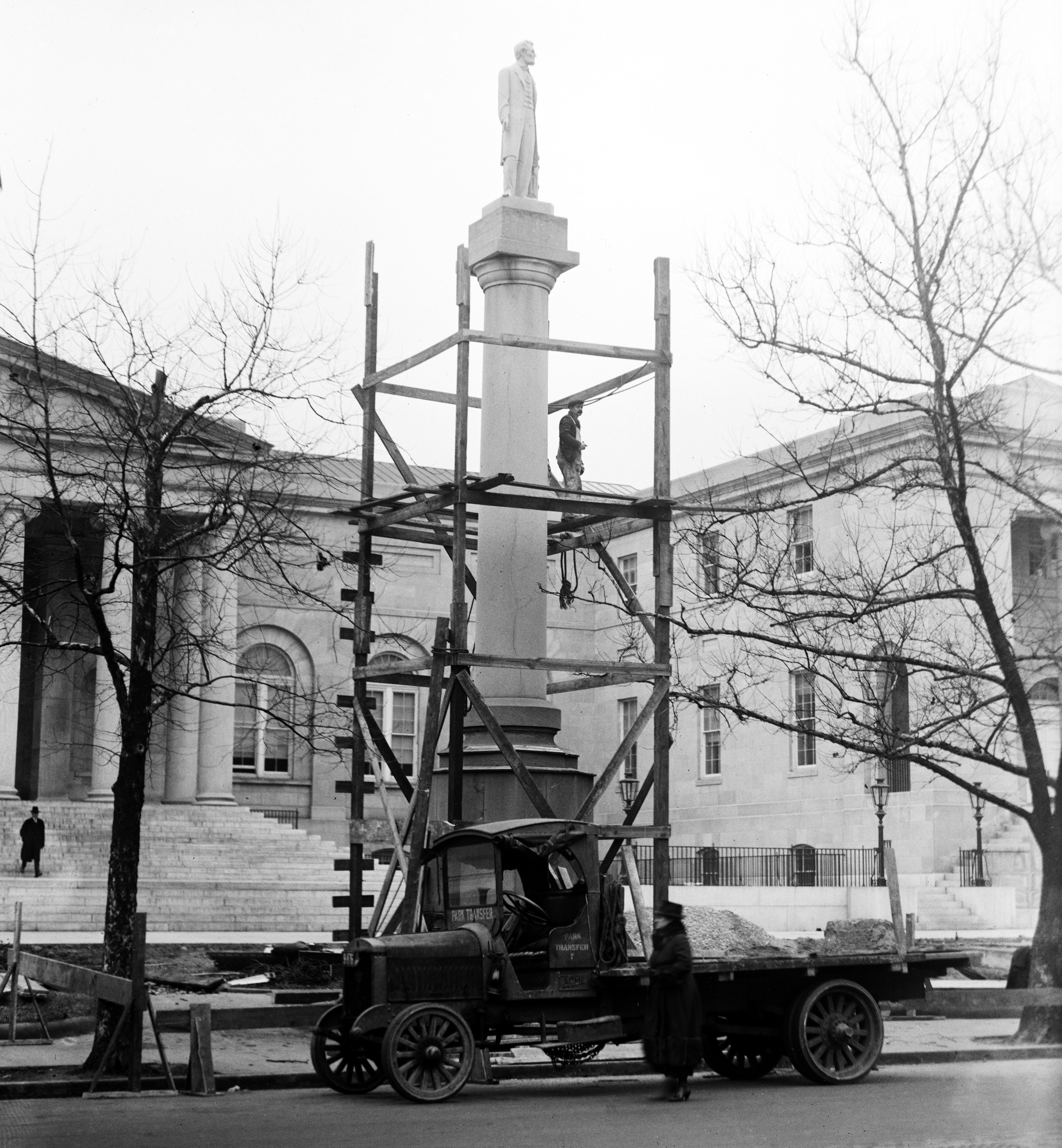
The memorial being dismantled in 1919

In 1919, the memorial was dismantled and placed in storage during the renovations of City Hall. Some of the city's residents and officials did not want the memorial reinstalled when renovations were complete since the much larger and grander Lincoln Memorial was already under construction. Others thought the tall pedestal was unsafe. When the public heard of the plans to leave the monument in storage, many were upset and groups such as the Grand Army of the Republic demanded the statue be reinstalled. President Warren G. Harding even lobbied Congress on behalf of angry citizens. Government officials conceded, but by that point, the statue was missing. It was later found in crates behind the Bureau of Engraving and Printing and cleaned. On June 21, 1922, an Act of Congress authorized the rededication, which took place April 15, 1923, 55 years after the initial dedication. When the statue was replaced, it was set on a new shorter base instead of the original column. An unexpected consequence of this was vandals having easy access to the statue. Lincoln's fingers were broken off several times, and his right hand had to be replaced.

In 2006, the memorial was moved when renovations once again took place on the old City Hall, now home to the District of Columbia Court of Appeals. The statue was restored and cleaned before being returned when renovations were completed in 2009. On April 15, 2009, 144 years after the original dedication, the memorial was rededicated a second time. The statue is the country's oldest extant memorial to Lincoln. It is one of six statues in public places in Washington, D.C. honoring the slain president.

== Design and location ==
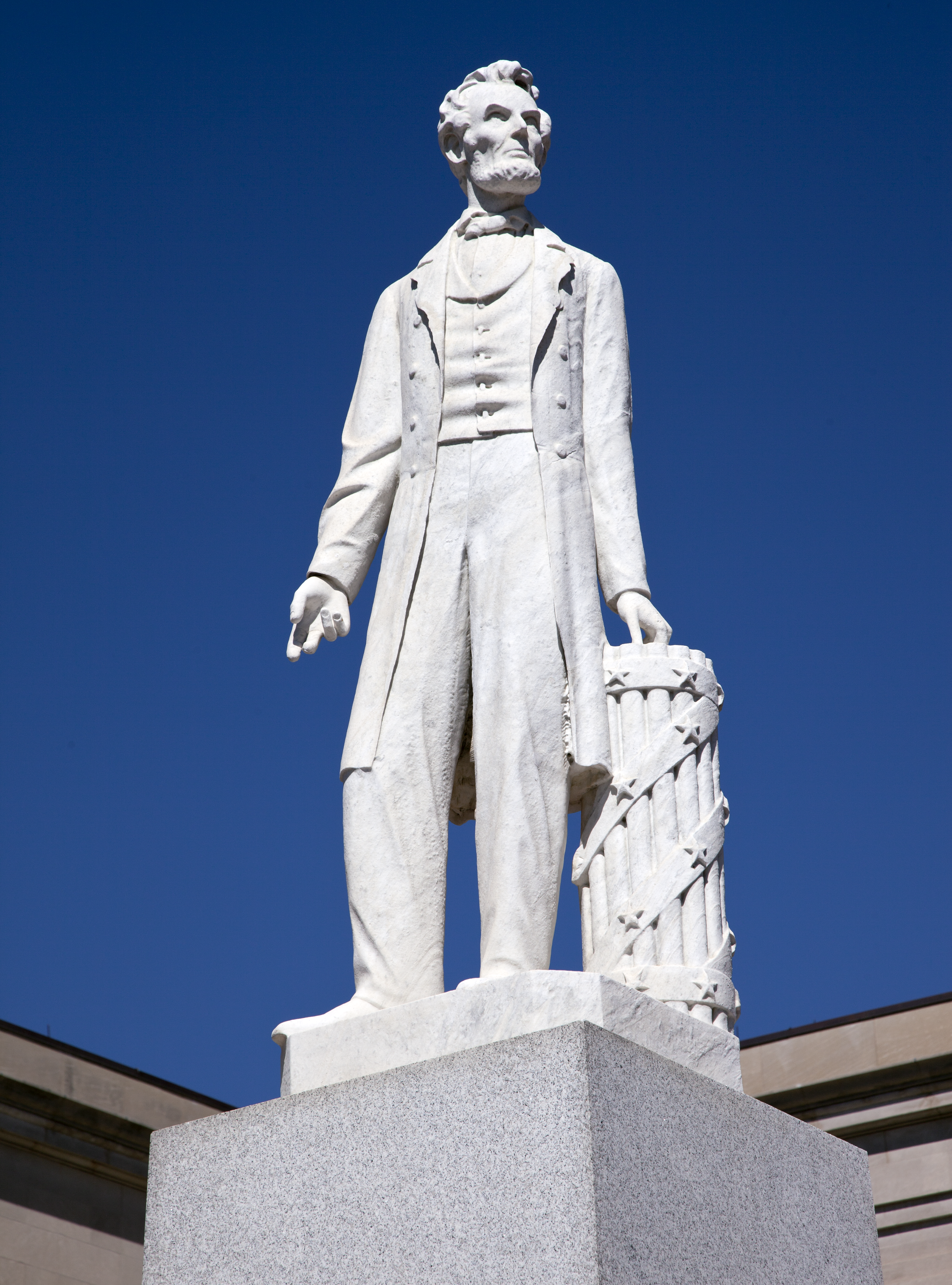
Close-up of the statue

The marble statue is located on Indiana Avenue NW, in front of the old District of Columbia City Hall in the Judiciary Square neighborhood. It measures 7.3 feet (2.2 m) high 2.9 feet (0.88 m) wide while the granite base measures 6.4 feet (2.0 m) high and 7 feet (2.1 m) wide. The statue portrays Abraham Lincoln standing, wearing a long coat with a bow tie and waistcoat. His left hand rests on a fasces while his right arm is by his side. Lincoln's partially open right hand points to the ground as he looks to his left. The right hand was replaced at some point, and the new one is considered too large to scale. A sword or scroll previously hung by his right side but is now missing. The two-tiered base consists of a rectangle on top of a lower square-shaped foundation.

The statue originally stood on an 18-foot (5.5 m) high marble column atop a 6-foot (1.8 m) high octagonal base. A reporter asked Lot Flannery why the statue was set on such a high pedestal. He responded: "I lived through the days and nights of gloom following the assassination. As to every one else, it was a personal lamentation. And when it fell to me to carve and erect this statue I resolved and did place it so high that no assassin's hand could ever again strike him down."

Inscriptions on the monument include the following:

- Lot Flannery, Sculptor (rear of the sculpture)
- LINCOLN (front of the base)
- ABRAHAM LINCOLN / 1809–1865 / THIS STATVE WAS ERECTED / BY THE CITIZENS OF THE / DISTRICT OF COLVMBIA / APRIL 15 1868 / RE-ERECTED APRIL 15 1923 / VNDER ACT OF CONGRESS / OF JVNE 21 1922 (rear of the base)
- Frank G. Pierson, Architect (rear of the base, lowest section)

== See also ==
- 1868 in art
- List of public art in Washington, D.C., Ward 6
- List of sculptures of presidents of the United States
- List of statues of Abraham Lincoln
- Outdoor sculpture in Washington, D.C.
