= District of Columbia City Hall =

- U.S. National Register of Historic Places
- U.S. National Historic Landmark
- D.C. Inventory of Historic Sites
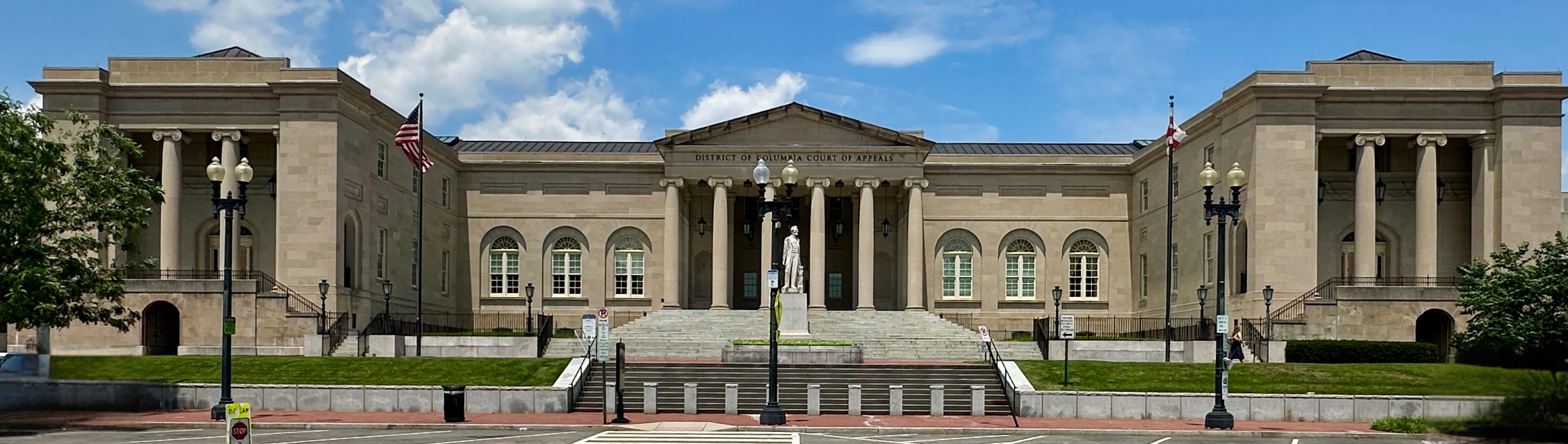
- The former District of Columbia City Hall in 2026

- Location within Central Washington, D.C. Location within the District of Columbia Location within the United States
- Location: 451 Indiana Avenue NW; Washington, D.C.
- Coordinates: 38°53′43″N 77°1′4″W
- Built: 1820; 206 years ago
- Architectural style: Neoclassical
- NRHP reference No.: 66000857
- DCIHS No.: 437

Significant dates
- Added to NRHP: October 15, 1966
- Designated NHL: December 19, 1960
- Designated DCIHS: November 8, 1964

District of Columbia City Hall, also known as Old City Hall and the District of Columbia Courthouse, is a historic building at Judiciary Square in downtown Washington, D.C. facing Indiana Avenue. Originally built for the offices of the government of the District of Columbia, the District's courthouse was subsequently used as a Federal courthouse, and was the scene of several notable criminal trials including those of three accused presidential assassins. The building was declared a National Historic Landmark in 1960. It now houses the District of Columbia Court of Appeals.

== History ==
The government of the District of Columbia held a competition for the design of a new district building in 1818. George Hadfield, who had supervised construction of the United States Capitol from October 1795 to May 1798, submitted a design for a new district building, but it was judged to be too costly. Hadfield eventually won the competition in 1820 with a revised version of his original plan, and construction began in August. The offices of the district government moved into the building in 1822. However, a lack of funds and other problems hindered construction and the building would not be completed in its entirety until 1849.

According to the NRHP nomination for the adjacent, compatibly-designed United States Court of Military Appeals Building (1910), the district building's south side plan is attributed to George Hadfield, but the north side plan is attributed to Robert Mills.

To raise funds needed to finish the building, the district leased out space during construction to other federal government offices. Tenants included the U.S. Circuit Court and the Recorder of Deeds office, then headed by noted black leader and abolitionist Frederick Douglass, (1818–1895), who also later served as U.S. Marshal for the District. Following passage of the District of Columbia Compensated Emancipation Act in 1862, the Old City Hall was used to process payments to slaveholders.

The federal government rented additional space in 1863 during the American Civil War and later purchased the building from the District government to house the Supreme Court of the District of Columbia. In 1868, a statue of 16th President Abraham Lincoln sculpted by Lot Flannery was erected on the south side of the building, which became the first public monument in his honor. The offices of the District of Columbia government moved to the new District Building in 1908 and the Old City Hall was left to house the federal courts until they vacated the property in 1910.

In 1916, Congress approved funds for a complete building renovation. The building was stripped to its brick framing, and the stucco exterior was replaced with limestone blocks on a granite base. The building was rededicated as the U.S. Courthouse in 1922. The federal courts moved to the new E. Barrett Prettyman United States Courthouse in 1952 and the Old City Hall eventually became the headquarters of the U.S. Selective Service System. The building was named a National Historic Landmark in 1960 and was returned to the District government two years later for use by the local courts.

== Prominent cases ==
Many famous cases were tried at the Old City Hall while it was a U.S. courthouse. Former Tennessee Governor and then Cherokee representative Sam Houston, was tried and convicted for assaulting a member of Congress (Ohio Rep. William Stanbery) after he slandered Houston in a speech on the House of Representatives floor in 1832. Richard Lawrence, the failed assassin of 7th President Andrew Jackson, (the first assassination attempt against an American President) was tried on the site in 1835 under District of Columbia prosecuting attorney Francis Scott Key, (1779–1843), and was sentenced to a mental institution. The Old City Hall was the scene of a fugitive slave trial known as the "Pearl incident," which was the largest single escape by slaves attempted in U.S. history. Two men were convicted in 1848 of attempting to free more than 70 slaves by sailing them from Washington, D.C. down the Potomac River then up the Chesapeake Bay. The building was the site of the 1867 trial of John Surratt, one of the alleged conspirators in the assassination of Abraham Lincoln who was later acquitted. In 1882, Charles J. Guiteau, the assassin of President James A. Garfield, was convicted at the courthouse.

== Current use ==
In 1999, the building closed for an extensive renovation by the architecture firm of Beyer Blinder Belle. Steel framing replaced the old masonry while leaving the stone façade intact. A new glass atrium was constructed on the north side of the building facing Judiciary Square and is now the main entrance, as had been originally intended. The District of Columbia Courthouse was rededicated on June 17, 2009 as the home of the District of Columbia Court of Appeals.

== See also ==
- List of National Historic Landmarks in Washington, D.C.
- National Register of Historic Places listings in central Washington, D.C.
