= Darlington Memorial Fountain =

Sculpture and fountain in Washington, D.C.

- U.S. Historic district – Contributing property
- D.C. Inventory of Historic Sites
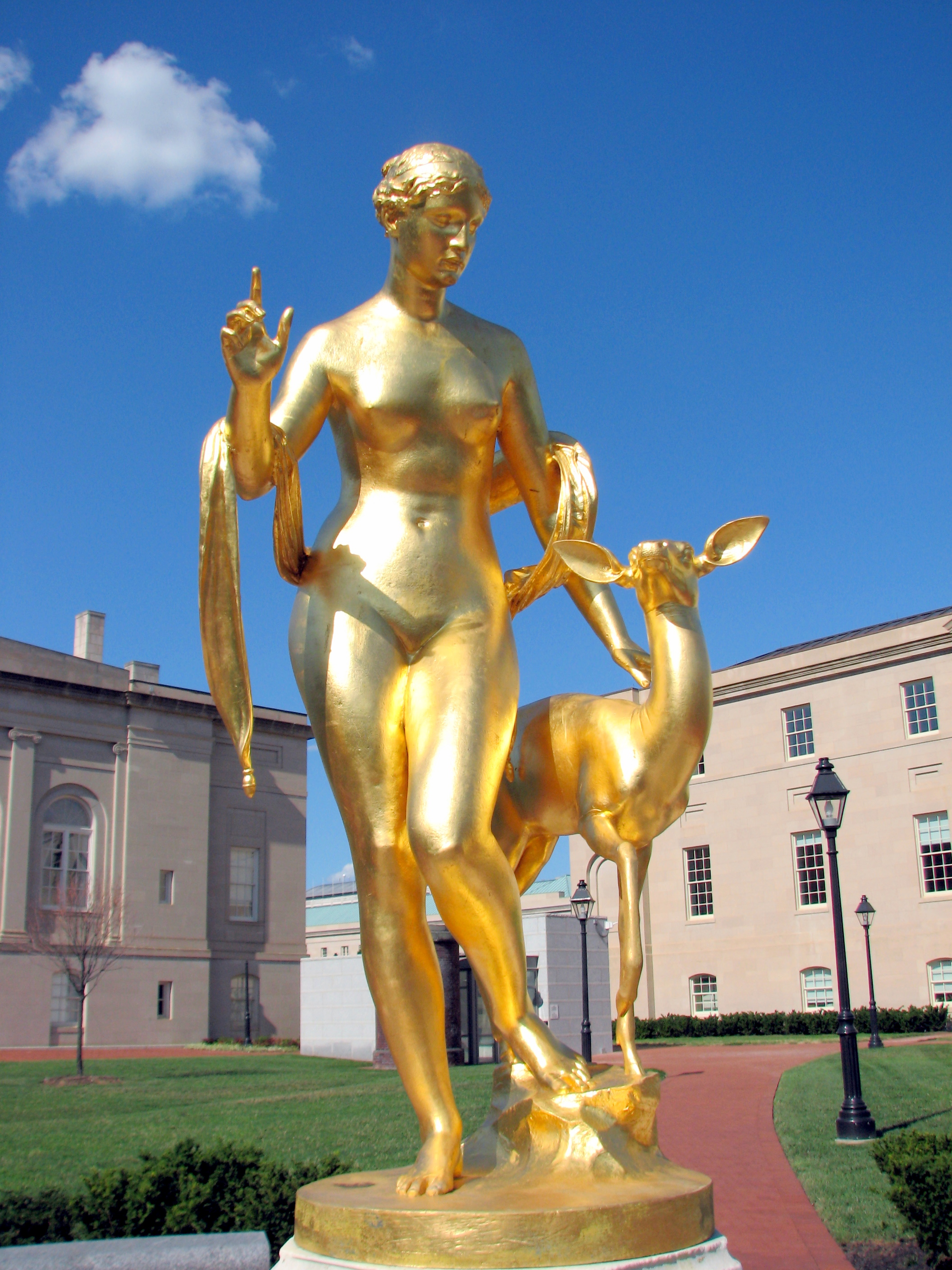
- Darlington Memorial Fountain's nymph and fawn
- Location: 5th & D Streets NW, Judiciary Park, Washington, D.C., U.S.
- Coordinates: 38°53′43″N 77°1′7″W
- Built: 1923
- Architect: C. Paul Jennewein (sculptor); Kunst Foundry (founder)
- Part of: Pennsylvania Avenue National Historic Site

Significant dates
- Designated CP: October 15, 1966
- Designated DCIHS: June 19, 1973

The Darlington Memorial Fountain, also known as the Joseph Darlington Fountain, Nymph and Fawn, and Darlington Fountain, is a sculpture by C. Paul Jennewein atop a fountain in honor of Joseph James Darlington. It is located at Judiciary Park, where 5th Street, D Street, and Indiana Avenue NW intersect in the Judiciary Square neighborhood of Washington, D.C. The fountain is surrounded on three sides by government buildings, including the United States Court of Military Appeals, the H. Carl Moultrie Courthouse, and the former District of Columbia City Hall.

Darlington (1849–1920) was a native of South Carolina who worked as a teacher for several years before moving to Washington, D.C. He took classes at the Columbian Law School (now the George Washington University Law School), and founded a law practice with a friend after they graduated. Darlington earned a reputation as a religious and friendly person. He stopped teaching law classes and focused on writing a successful book, which was used for decades by other law students. When he died in 1920, Darlington received an outpouring of support from politicians, lawyers, and his religious friends.

A memorial was planned one year after Darlington's death. There were several submissions for a memorial and Jennewein, a successful German-American sculptor, was selected for the project. The fountain and its sculpture were paid for by members of the Washington Bar Association. After the United States Commission of Fine Arts approved his design, Jennewein began working on the project. The sculpture was ready by 1922, but the remaining pedestal and basin were not yet completed. When it was finished in late 1923, the unveiling of the fountain revealed a naked woman, something that was the source of many complaints about the artwork.

During later years, the fountain was often broken and the basin was used as a trash can. The National Park Service, which owned and maintained the fountain, transferred ownership to the Government of the District of Columbia. The fountain is one of many contributing properties to the Pennsylvania Avenue National Historic Site, which was listed on the National Register of Historic Places in 1966. It is also a contributing property to the proposed Judiciary Square Historic District.

== History ==
=== Biography ===
Joseph James Darlington was born February 10, 1849, in Due West, South Carolina. His parents had chosen to move to Due West because the town's schools had a good reputation of educating children. Darlington and one of his siblings attended Erskine College, earning his Bachelor of Arts degree when he was 19. Later that year, he began teaching, moving several times to other towns in South Carolina where he not only taught in schools, but worked as a private tutor as well. Darlington took music lessons and would sing at night in one of the drawing rooms. In 1872, he accepted a teaching job in Rome, Georgia, where he remained for several years before moving to Washington, D.C., to practice law.

When Darlington arrived in Washington, D.C., he came with an introduction letter written by Alexander H. Stephens, who had served as Vice President of the Confederate States of America during the Civil War. The letter was given to Richard T. Merrick, a leader in the city's bar. Darlington began studying law at the Columbian Law School (now the George Washington University Law School), and quickly advanced through his courses, earning a Bachelor of Laws in 1875.

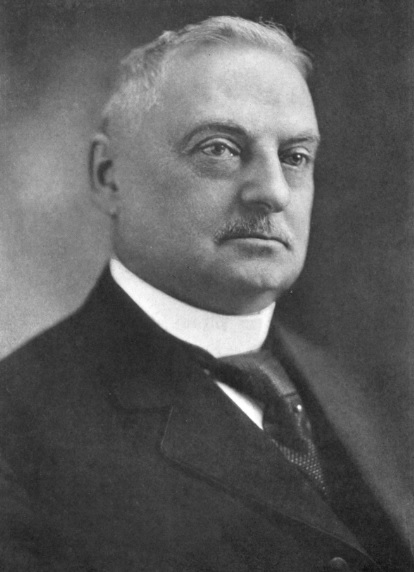
Joseph James Darlington (1849–1920), to whom the memorial is dedicated, was a successful legal scholar.

Darlington and his friend, Talmadge A. Lambert, opened their own practice in the Capitol Hill neighborhood. His first dollars from the practice were given to Fifth Baptist Church, where he would attend for decades, as Darlington was a very religious person who read parts of the Bible each day, and did not smoke or gamble. Darlington's passion for law combined with his friendly personality endeared him to many in the community, including other lawyers.

After the death of his second wife, Darlington became depressed, and decided working a lot would be the cure. By 1881, he returned to teaching, this time at his alma mater, Columbian Law School. He remained there until 1896, when he left to continue writing his law school book. The book was a success and used for decades at the college's law school. Darlington died on June 24, 1920, and there was an immense outpouring of praise from people involved with religious, judicial, and commercial interests. He was buried at Oak Hill Cemetery.

The Southern Baptist Convention voted in 1921 to erect a memorial in Darlington's honor. The resolution stated in part: "He became eminent in his profession, being regarded by many as the ablest lawyer in the District of Columbia. He was constantly before the United States Supreme Court in cases of National note" and "His great intellectuality, his legal and literary attainments and his versatile accomplishments were crowned by a gentle and gracious spirit. The Christian religion found in him a rare advocate and exemplar."

=== Memorial ===
There were additional calls for a memorial by members of the Washington Bar Association (WBA). Members of the WBA funded the project at a cost of $9,173. Six sculptors submitted three designs that the United States Commission of Fine Arts (CFA) received, and German-American C. Paul Jennewein's design was selected in 1921. His initial design was for the memorial to be a drinking fountain. Some of Jennewein's other works in Washington, D.C., include dozens of sculptural elements inside the Robert F. Kennedy Department of Justice Building, the Trylon of Freedom in front of the E. Barrett Prettyman United States Courthouse, the Noyes Armillary Sphere in Meridian Hill Park, and sculptures for the Rayburn House Office Building.

Congressional support for the fountain came from Representative James F. Byrnes and Senator Frank B. Brandegee. On March 3, 1923, an Act of Congress approved the installation of the fountain on federal land, with a few exceptions, such as the National Mall and United States Capitol Complex. The location chosen for the fountain was chosen because Darlington spent much time in the area's court buildings, and one of his offices was on the opposite corner of the memorial. Site work for the fountain began in September 1923, when workers began laying the foundation.

The following month the finished sculpture was placed atop its pedestal. The sculpture had been completed the previous year and it was displayed in Baltimore and New York City until the rest of the memorial was ready. In describing the sculpture, Jennewein said "humanity is exemplified by a maiden so tender and gentle that the most timid of God's animals does not hesitate to seek her protection." In November 1923, the 100 members of the Darlington Memorial Committee including chairman Charles C. Glover met at the home of attorney Frank J. Hogan to discuss the fountain's unveiling.

The design of the sculpture, which features a nude woman, received mixed reactions. Some members of the public including church clergy were appalled at the public display of nudity. Darlington's pastor, John E. Briggs, said Darlington would not approve of the sculpture. The idea of Darlington's memorial featuring a nude pagan shocked many. When the unveiling ceremony took place, and the sculpture was revealed, it had been turned around to face the United States Court of Military Appeals. Jennewein immediately had workers turn her back around so she would face the street. When asked why a nude statue was chosen, Jennewein replied she was "direct from the hand of God instead of from the hands of a dressmaker." Hogan tried to calm or deflect the criticism by pointing out the CFA had approved the design.

=== Later history ===
On October 15, 1966, the fountain and many of the surrounding buildings were designated contributing properties to the Pennsylvania Avenue National Historic Site, which is listed on the National Register of Historic Places. On June 19, 1973, it was added to the District of Columbia Inventory of Historic Sites. The fountain is also a contributing property to the proposed Judiciary Square Historic District.

The National Park Service maintained the fountain until 1970, when ownership was transferred to the city's government. Since it was installed, the fountain has sometimes been treated as a trash bin when the water feature doesn't work. The similarities between the fountain and Spirit of Justice, a statue by Jennewein in the Robert F. Kennedy Department of Justice Building, were brought to attention in 2002 when U.S. Attorney General John Ashcroft ordered a "modesty curtain" be installed in front of the statue to hide an exposed breast.

== Location and design ==
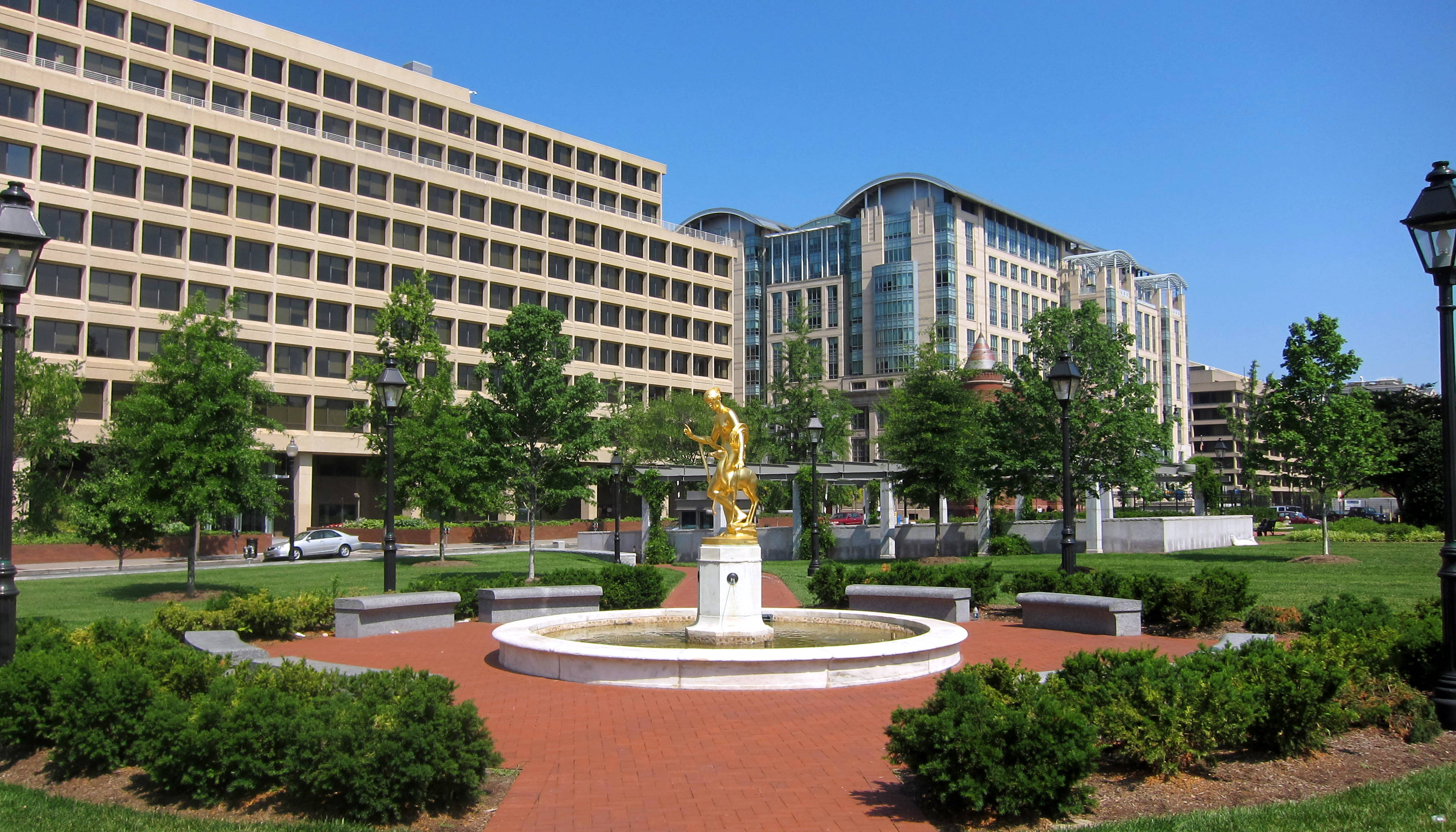
Judiciary Park and the Darlington Fountain, facing northwest

The fountain is located on the southwest corner of Judiciary Square in Judiciary Park, which is where 5th Street, D Street, and Indiana Avenue NW intersect. The United States Court of Military Appeals is sited behind the fountain, the H. Carl Moultrie Courthouse is across the street, and to the east of the fountain is the old District of Columbia City Hall. On the southeast corner of 4th and D Streets NW is a similarly shaped park, which lacks any art. The fountain is also referred to as the Joseph Darlington Fountain, Nymph and Fawn, and the Darlington Fountain.

The sculpture is made of gilded bronze. It is five-feet (1.5 m) tall and 3-feet (0.9 m) wide. The nymph is standing beside a fawn and placing her left hand on the fawn's back. Her right arm is raised, with her thumb and one finger pointing towards the sky. Around her arms and behind her back is a drape. The fawn, standing on a small raised platform, is looking at the nymph.

The marble pedestal, which is 4-feet (1.2 m) high and 3.6-feet (1.1 m) wide, is octagonal-shaped and made of marble. On four of the pedestal's sides are water spouts. The basin, which is also marble, measures 1.3-feet (0.4 m) tall and has a diameter of 18-feet (5.5 m). The interior lining of the basin is covered with pebbles. The area surrounding the fountain is brick and includes granite benches. The brick portion is surrounded by shrubbery, evergreen trees, and decorative light posts.

=== Inscription ===
The inscription reads:

On top of bronze base
A. Kunst
Bronze Foundry N.Y.
C.P. Jennewein
SC. 1922

On side of bronze base
C.P. Jennewein
SC. 1922

On side of marble base
This monument has been erected by his friends with the
sanction of Congress in memory of Joseph James Darlington
1849–1920
counselor teacher
lover of mankind

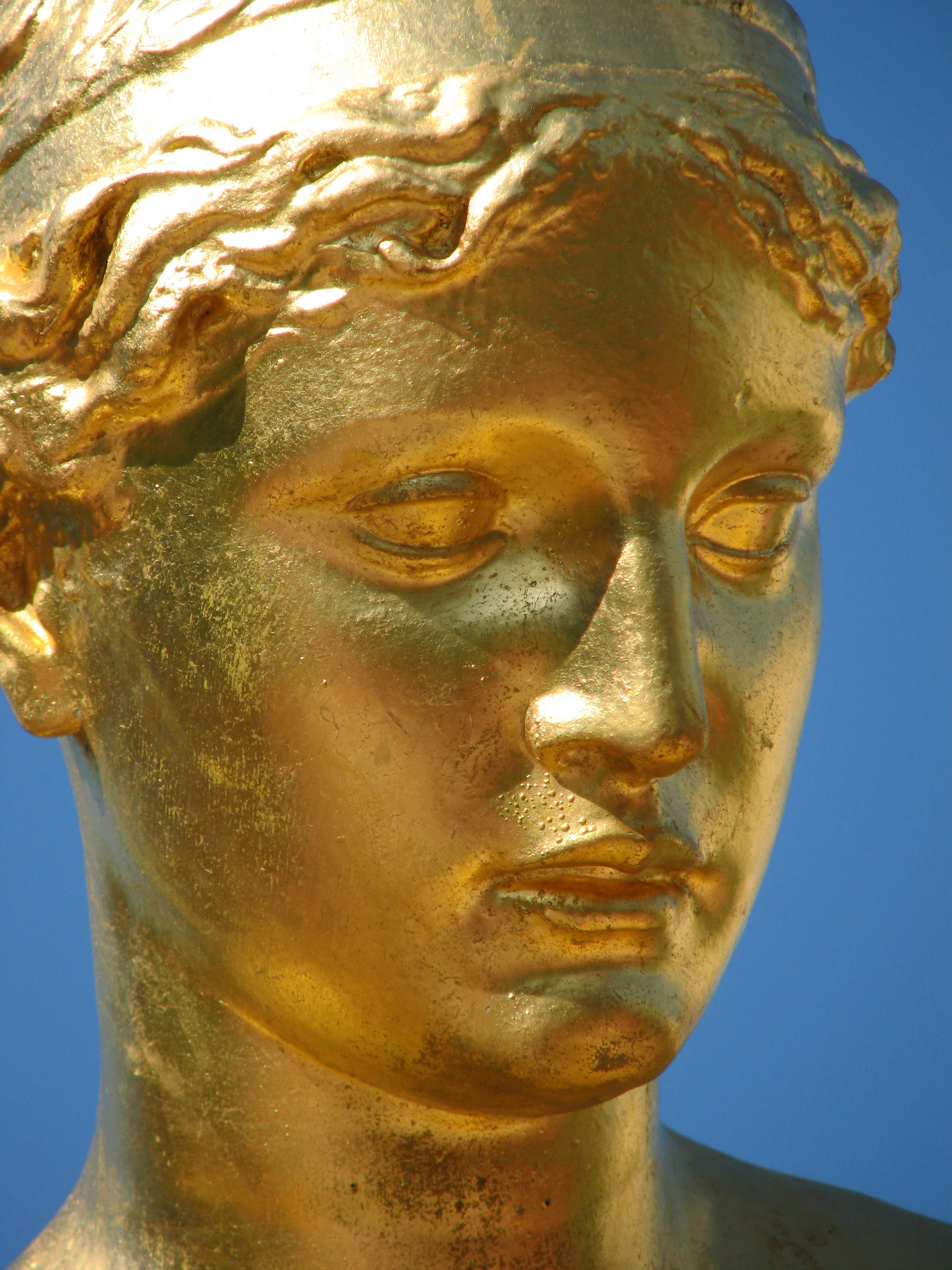
The nymph's face

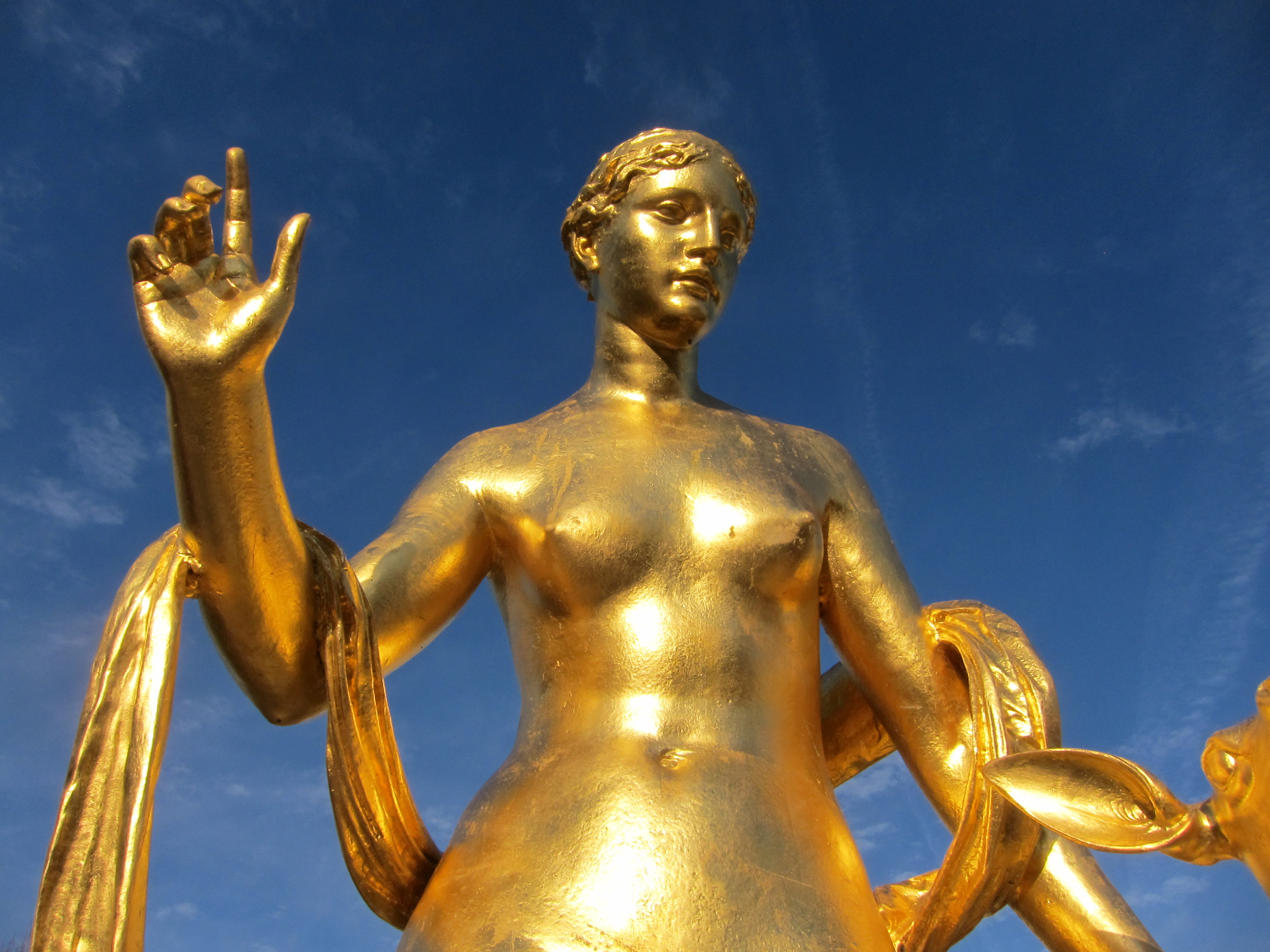
Sculpture details of the nymph

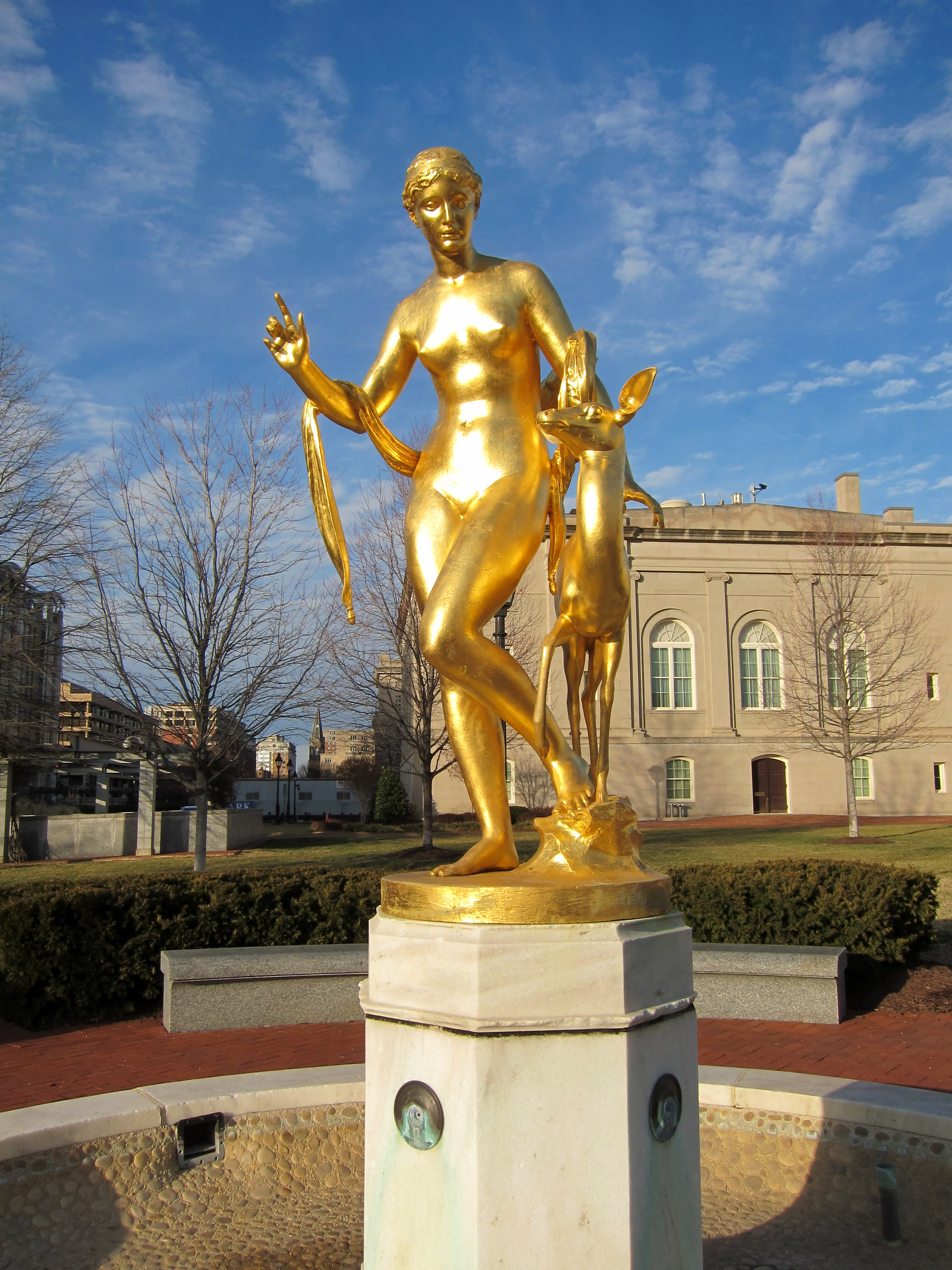
The water feature does not operate during winter

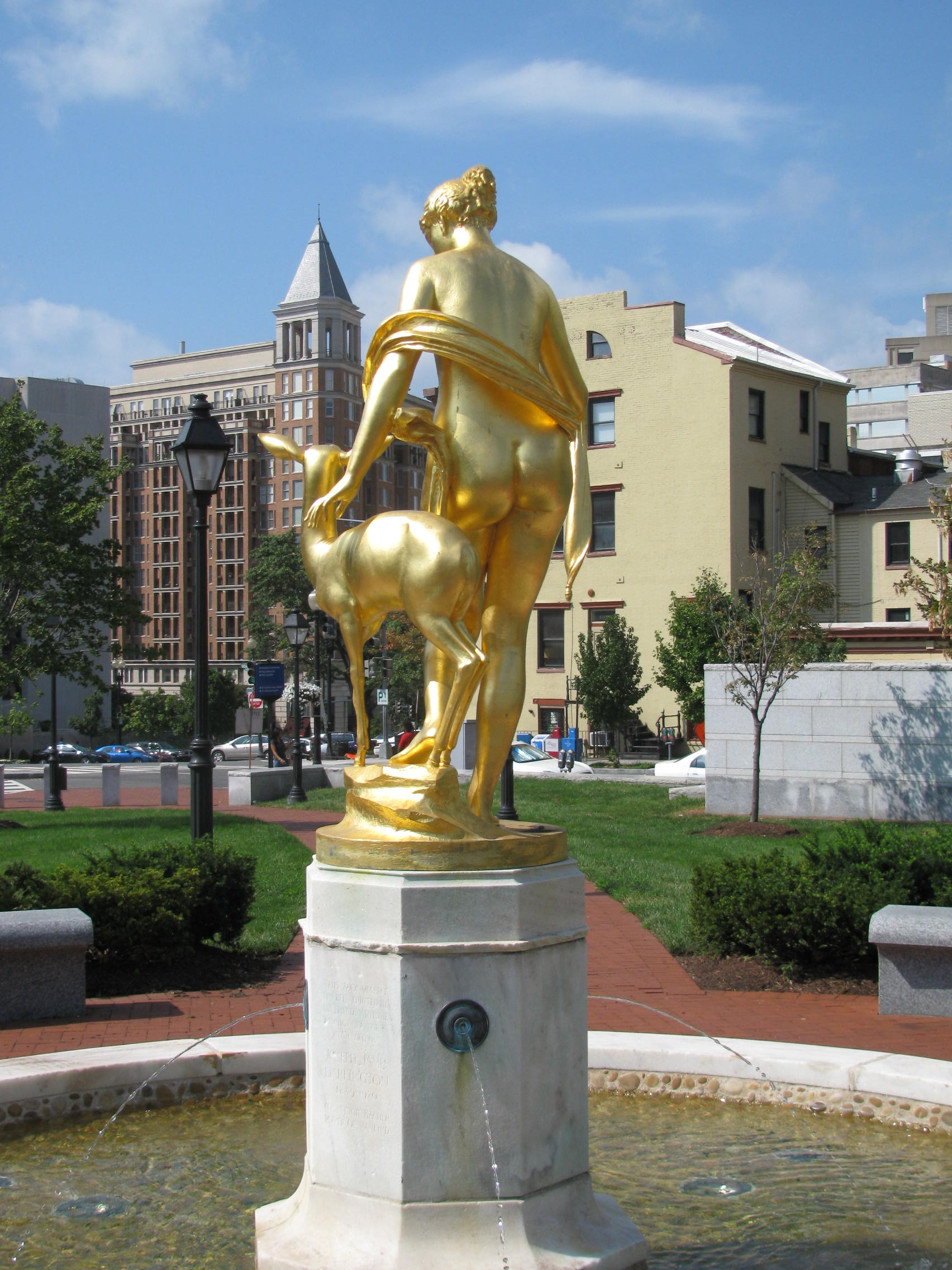
Rear view of the fountain

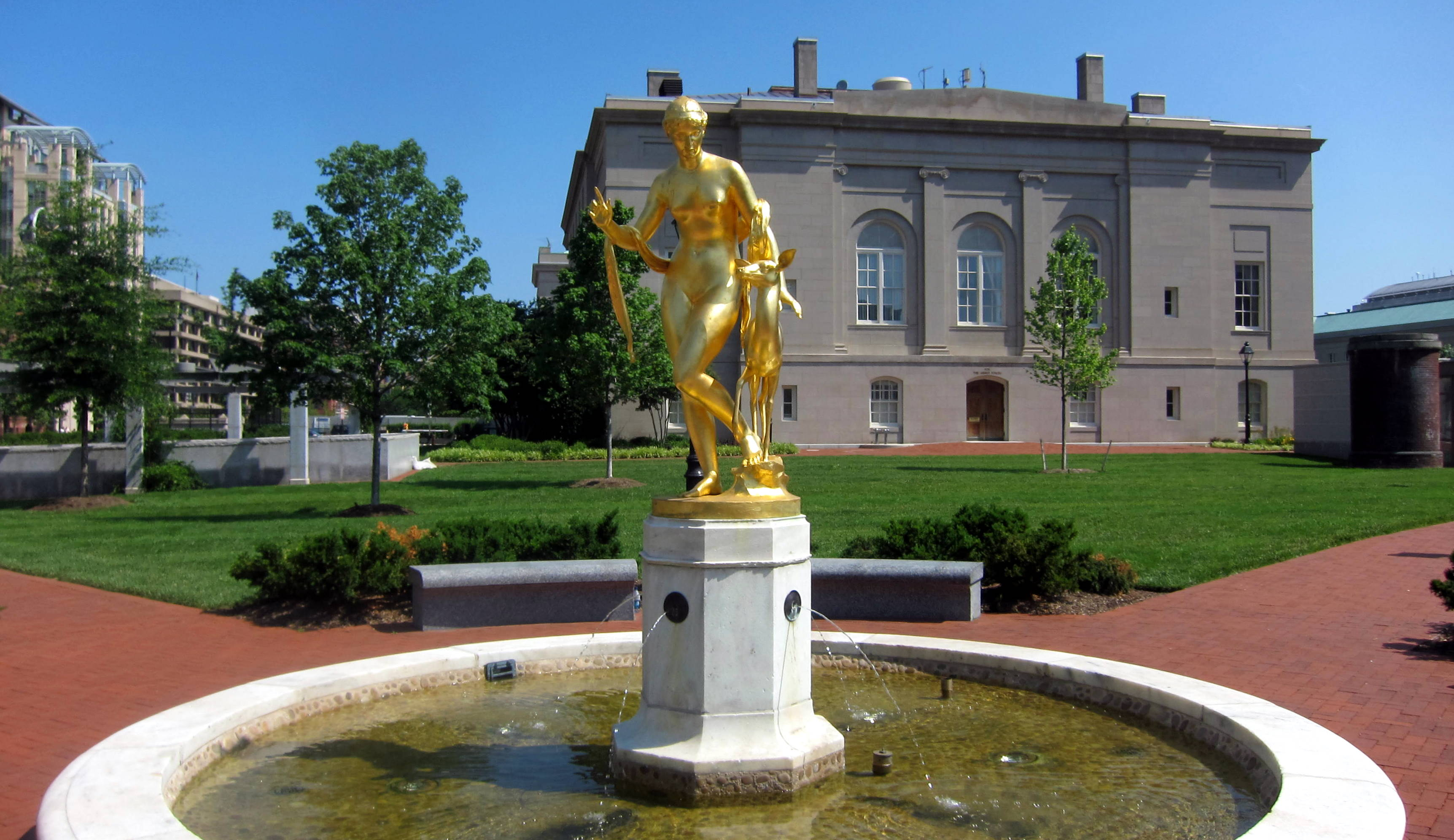
The fountain and U.S. Court of Military Appeals in the background

== See also ==
- History of fountains in the United States
- List of public art in Washington, D.C., Ward 6
- Outdoor sculpture in Washington, D.C.
