= C. Paul Jennewein =

American sculptor

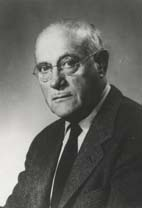
C. Paul Jennewein

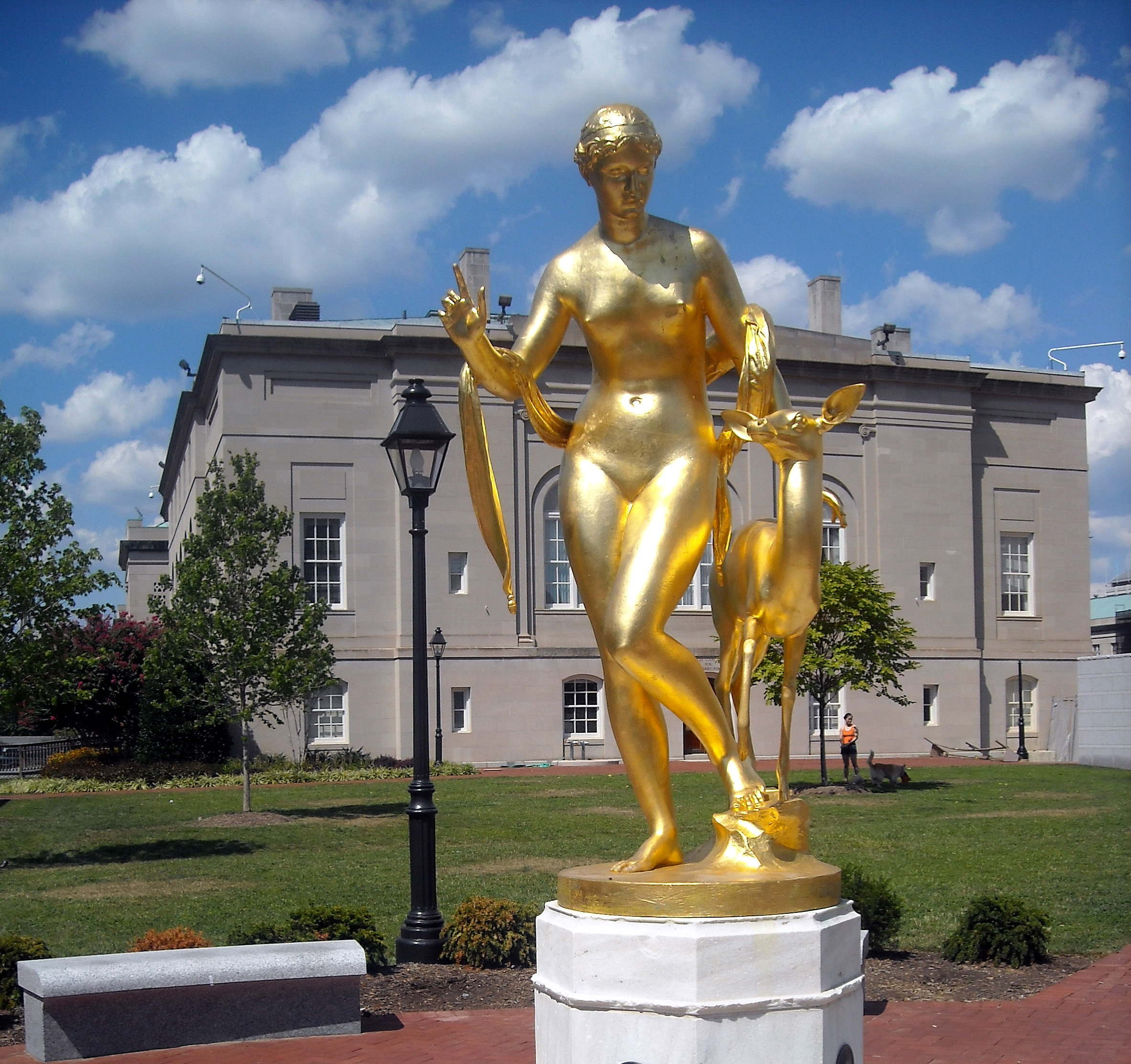
Darlington Memorial Fountain: Nymph and Fawn in Washington, D.C.

Carl Paul Jennewein (December 2, 1890 – February 22, 1978) was a German-born American sculptor.

== Early career ==
Jennewein was born in Stuttgart in Germany. At the age of seventeen, he immigrated to the United States in 1907.

He was apprenticed with the firm of Buhler and Lauter in New York where he received his early training. He took evening classes at the Art Students League of New York. Much of his early work was as a muralist, including in 1912 four murals for the Woolworth Building; the first building to be called "the Cathedral of Commerce."

In 1915 Jennewein became a naturalized U.S. citizen when he was twenty-five years old. Soon afterward he entered the United States Army. In 1916 his tour was cut short when he was awarded an honorable discharge after receiving the Rome Prize, a highly sought-after art award. This allowed him to study at the American Academy in Rome for the next three years; in Rome Jennewein turned his attention to sculpture. By 1928, Jennewein had set up his studio in the Van Nest section of the Bronx where he remained until 1978, the year of his death.

== Architectural sculpture ==
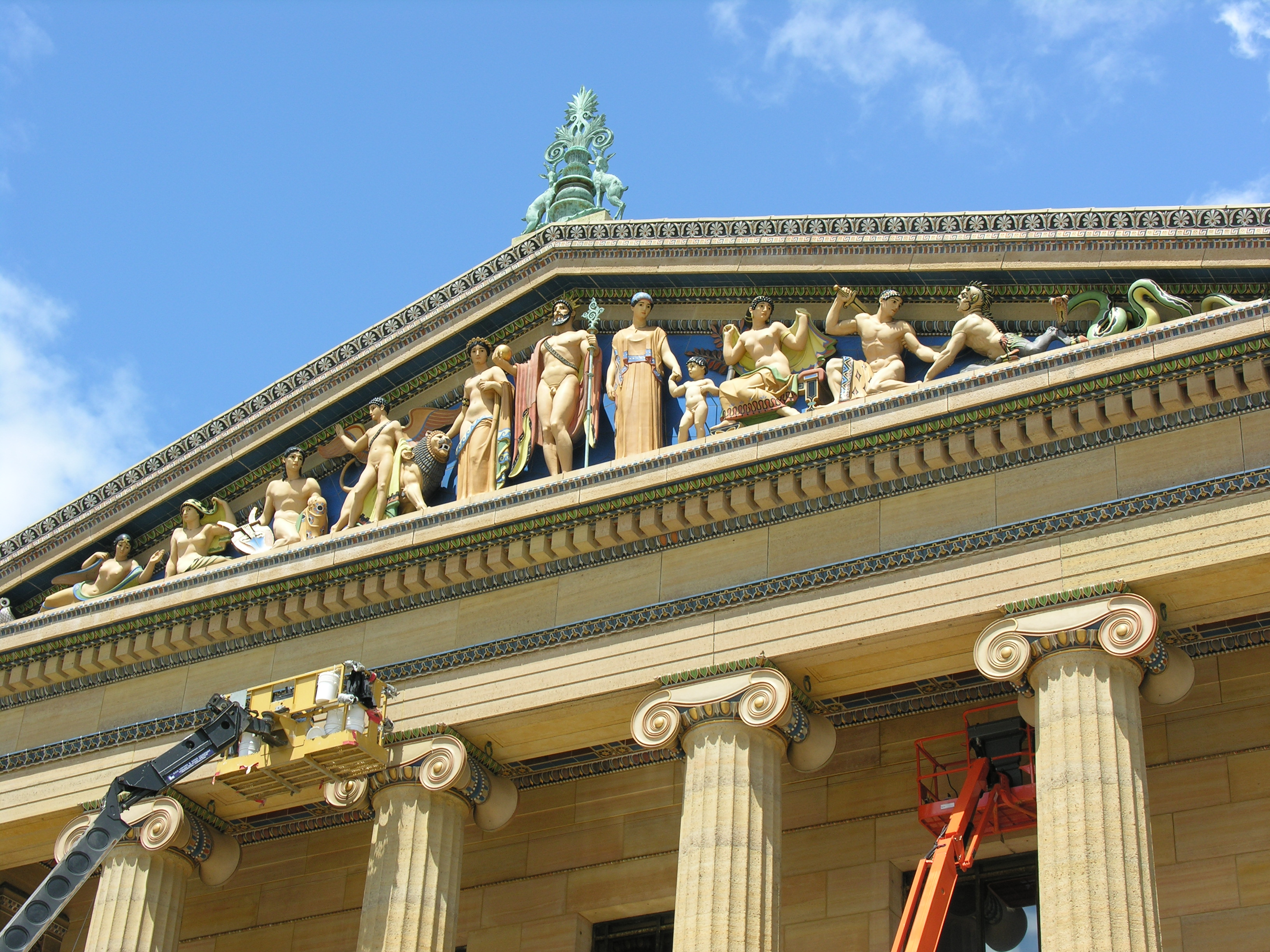
Western Civilization, pediment sculpture, Philadelphia Museum of Art (1933)

- 1923: Lincoln Life Insurance Building, Fort Wayne, Indiana
- 1931: Education Building, Harrisburg, Pennsylvania
- 1932: British Empire Building at Rockefeller Center, Manhattan
- 1933: Pediment, Philadelphia Museum of Art, Philadelphia, Pennsylvania
- 1934: Justice Department Building, Washington, D.C., (57 separate sculptural elements)
- 1936: Noyes Armillary Sphere, Washington, D.C. (stolen or misplaced, a replica was installed in 2024)
- 1936: Kansas City City Hall Kansas City, Missouri
- 1938: Finance Building, Harrisburg, Pennsylvania
- 1939: Two stone pylons, Brooklyn Public Library, Brooklyn, New York
- 1940: West Virginia State Office Building, Charleston, West Virginia
- 1941: Dauphin County Courthouse, (exterior and interior), Harrisburg, Pennsylvania
- 1950: Fulton County Building Annex, Atlanta, Georgia
- 1954: Two panels inside the White House, Washington, D.C.
- 1959: New York state seal on the front of the Court of Appeals building, Albany, New York
- 1964: Two monumental figures for the Rayburn House Office Building, Washington, D.C.

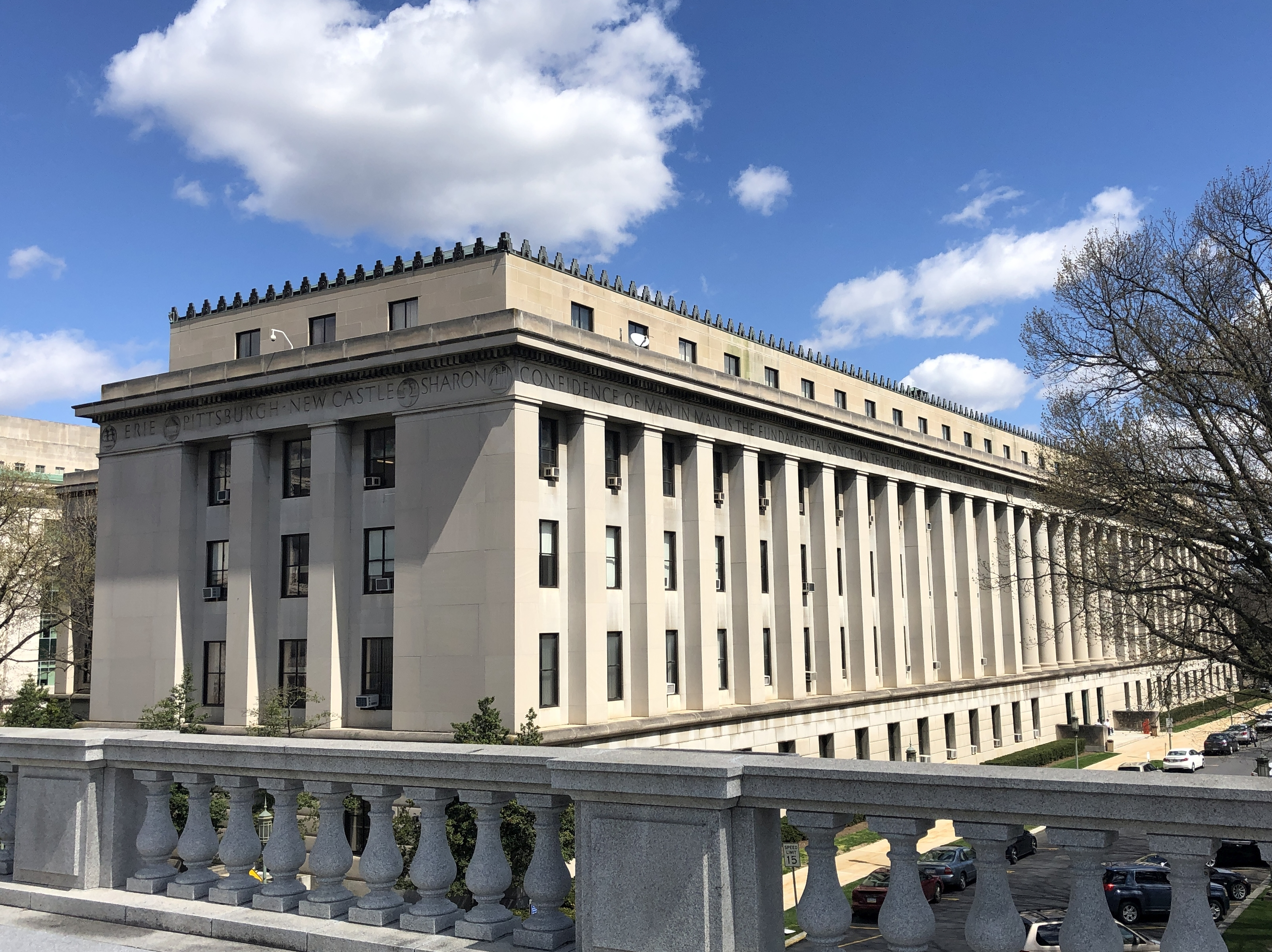
Frieze on the Finance Building of the Pennsylvania State Capitol Complex, in Harrisburg (1938).

== Later career ==
The work that he is probably best known for today, and which garnered him much praise when it was unveiled in 1933, was the polychrome figures in the pediment of the Philadelphia Museum of Art. Jennewein was one of 252 sculptors who exhibited in the 3rd Sculpture International Exhibition of the Fairmount Park Art Association (now the Association for Public Art) held at the Philadelphia Museum of Art in the summer of 1949.

In the course of their careers, Carl Paul Jennewein and his partner Warren Straton produced at least five monumental eagles: one at the entrance to Arlington National Cemetery in Arlington, Virginia, another on the Arlington Memorial Bridge, connecting Arlington with Washington, D.C., the third on the Federal Office Building in New York, the fourth, a Spanish–American War Memorial in Rochester, New York. The fifth was at Ardennes Memorial located in Neuville-en-Condroz in Belgium. They also produced somewhat smaller eagles for the gates of the Embassy of the United States in Paris.

Jennewein's sculpture, which never strayed too far from the classical ideals that he had come to so admire while in Rome, became increasingly modernized and his style comfortably fits into the Greco Deco category.

Jennewein's work received some attention when his Noyes Armillary Sphere disappeared during a riot in Washington, D.C., in the turbulent 1960s. It has not yet been recovered.

He also executed a number of medals during his career. In 1933, Jennewein sculpted Glory and Fame, the seventh issue in the long running Society of Medalists series. He also designed the inaugural medal for President Harry S. Truman in 1949.

Jennewein died on February 22, 1978, at his home in Larchmont, New York.

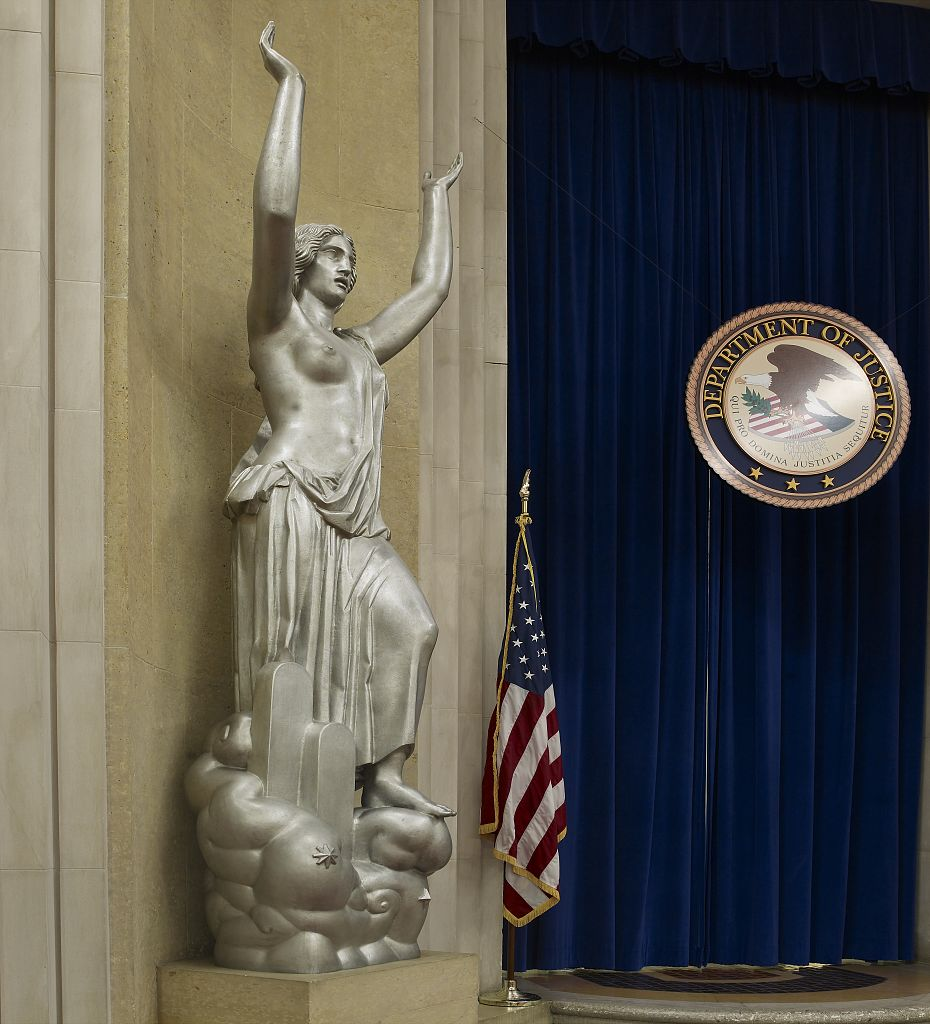
Spirit of Justice

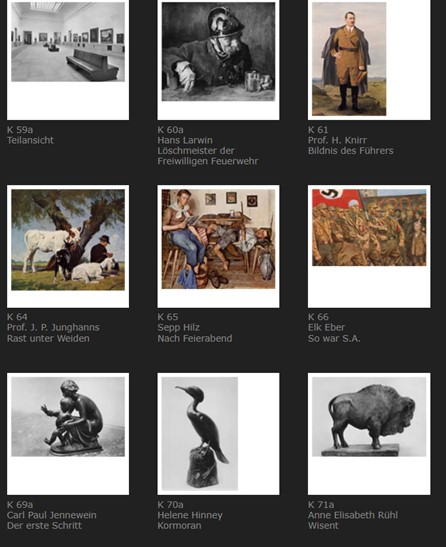
National Socialist postcards issued from 1937 – 1944 by The House of German Art. Left below Jennewein's ‘Der erste Schritt’, or ‘First Step’, depicting his wife Gina and their son Paul. An identical cast of ‘First Step’ is displayed by the Museum of Fine Arts of St. Petersburg, Florida.

== Controversy ==
In 2002, two of Jennewein's semi-nude figures in the Robert F. Kennedy Department of Justice Building in Washington, D.C., were hidden behind a curtain. This has been linked to the exposed breast on the female figure, Spirit of Justice (the male counterpart is Majesty of Law). The curtain was removed in 2005.

Several posthumous profiles of Jennewein have brought attention to his participation in the Great German Art Exhibitions (Große Deutsche Kunstausstellung) in Munich in 1937, 1938, and 1939. The shows were held annually in the House of German Art (Haus der Deustchen Kunst) from 1937-1944 with direct oversight from Adolf Hitler. According to Head of Archive at Haus Der Kunst Sabine Brantl, which succeeded the Haus der Deutschen Kunst after the fall of the Nazi Germany, the exhibitions "established an aesthetic and political space that served to implement and display" the ideological goals of Nazism, including the construction of an Aryan supremacist racial hierarchy. Additionally, the exhibitions attempted to contrast with art that the Nazis had labeled as “degenerate” and purged from Germany. Artists exhibiting at the House of German Art were required to be members of the Reich Chamber of Fine Arts (Reichskulturkammer), which in turn could only be attained by submitting proof of "Aryan descent". However, it is not known whether Jennewein was a member; he may have been granted an exception to the requirement.

Jennewein visited the Great German Art Exhibition in 1937 and came back very enthusiastic. In a letter d.d. 8 December 1937 to the American Architect Charles Borie, Jennewein writes: “I have just returned from a great trip, and I am still talking about the things I saw in Germany….I also feel that at last I have found out the answer to: 'What is wrong with American Art’. In 1938 he was selected in Munich to a group of 25 preferred artist who were allowed to display yearly more than 5 artworks at the Great German Art Exhibitions. His displayed works, photographed by Heinrich Hoffmann (photographer), were printed on postcards issued by the House of German Art. Several works by Jennewein, identical to his bronzes displayed in the Third Reich, are currently displayed by American institutions, including Yale University and the Metropolitan. In 1938 Jennewein sold three bronzes to Adolf Hitler: 'Tänzerin' ('Greek Dance'), 'Rast' (Resting') and 'Komödie' ('Comedy') for 600, 370, respectively 380 Reichsmark. After the war the US government apparently paid him almost 30,000 dollars compensation for the destruction of his art works bombed in Munich by Allied bombers.

== Recognition ==
Because Jennewein's studio was located in the Van Nest section of the Bronx, an honorary street sign was designated on June 2, 2011, to reflect his 50 years of contributions to the world of art and sculpture. Among those in attendance at the renaming ceremony were Jennewein's son James and his wife. Additionally, representatives from the National Sculpture Society and Brookgreen Gardens also were present for the unveiling ceremony.

In 1929 he was elected into the National Academy of Design as an Associate member and became a full Academician in 1933.
