= Robert F. Kennedy Department of Justice Building =

United States historic place and federal building

- U.S. Historic district – Contributing property
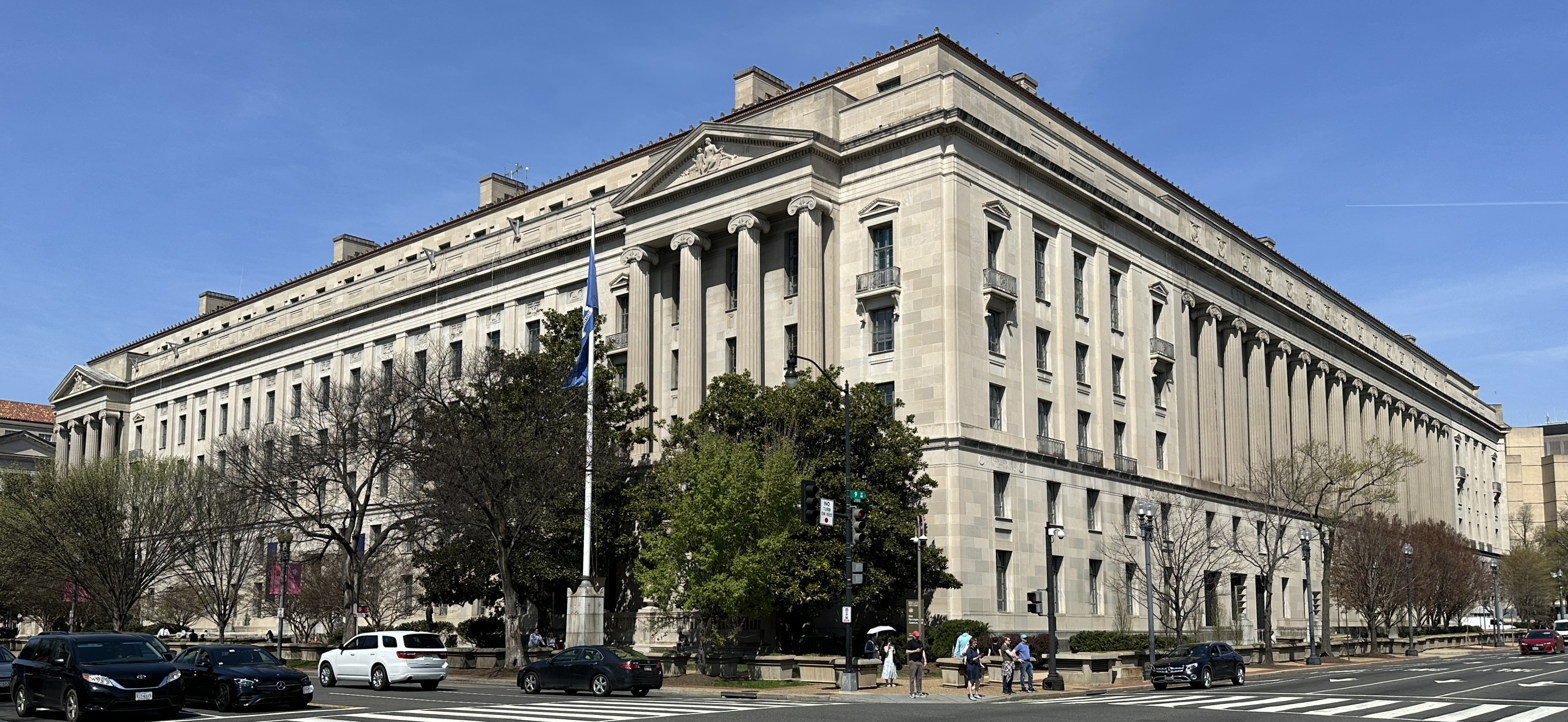
- Robert F. Kennedy Department of Justice Building in 2026

- Location within Washington, D.C.
- Location: 950 Pennsylvania Avenue, and Constitution Avenue, NW; Washington, D.C.
- Coordinates: 38°53′35.52″N 77°1′30″W
- Built: 1935
- Architect: Milton Bennett Medary; Charles L. Borie Jr.; Clarence C. Zantzinger.
- Architectural style: Classical Revival
- Part of: Pennsylvania Avenue National Historic Site (ID66000865)

The Robert F. Kennedy Department of Justice Building, sometimes called Main Justice, is the headquarters of the United States Department of Justice. It houses Department of Justice offices, including the office of the United States attorney general. The building was completed in 1935. In 2001, it was renamed after Robert F. Kennedy, the 64th U.S. attorney general.

The building is located in Washington, D.C. at 950 Pennsylvania Avenue NW, on a trapezoidal lot on the block bounded by Pennsylvania Avenue to the north, Constitution Avenue to the south, 9th Street to the east, and 10th Street NW to the west, in the Federal Triangle. It is located west of the National Archives Building, east of the Internal Revenue Service Building, north of the National Mall, and south of the J. Edgar Hoover Building. The building is owned by the General Services Administration. It comprises seven floors and 1.2 million sq ft (110,000 m^{2}).

== History ==
=== Construction ===
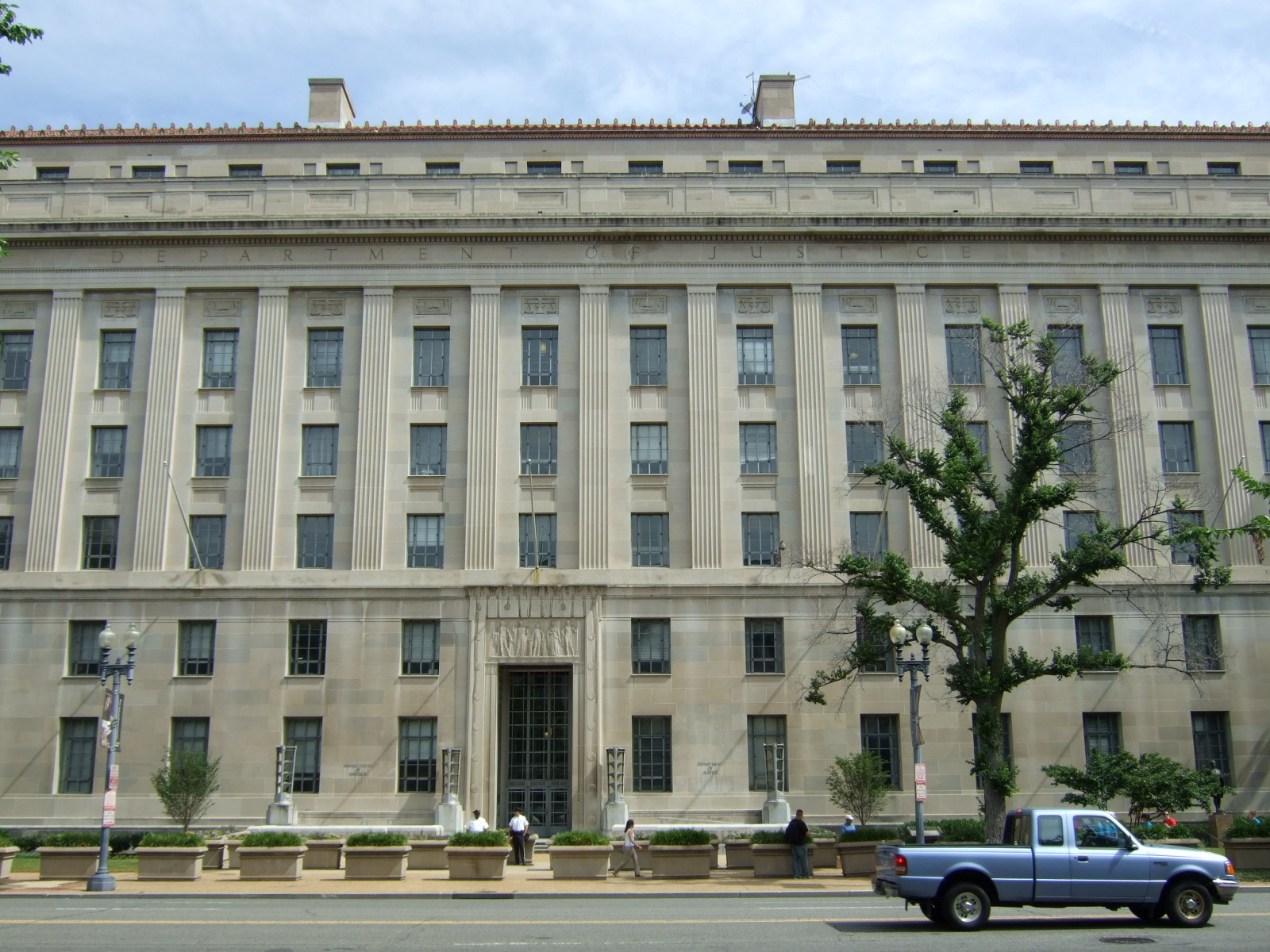
South front of the Robert F. Kennedy Department of Justice Building

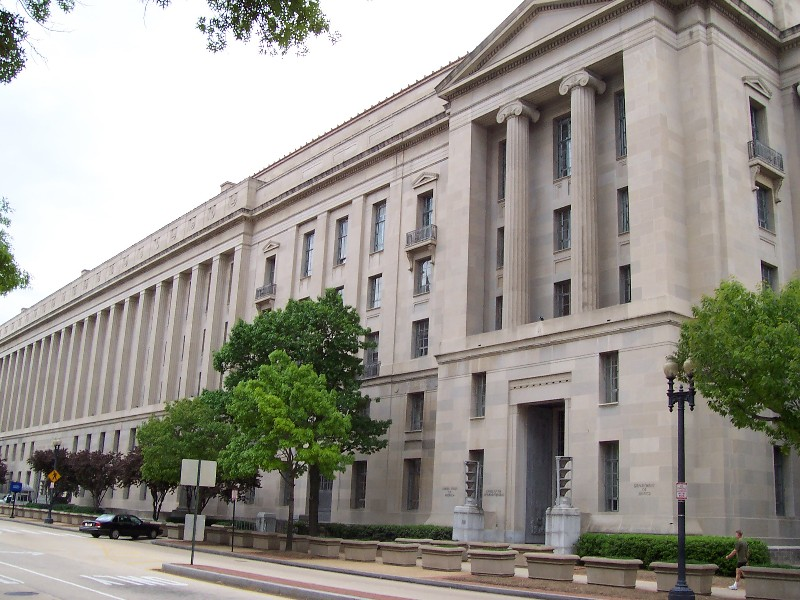
10th St. N.W. facade of the building, as seen from Constitution Avenue

The Office of the Attorney General was created by the 1st United States Congress by the Judiciary Act of 1789. In 1792, the Congress made the attorney general a Cabinet-level post.

=== 19th century ===
In 1870, President Ulysses S. Grant signed the bill creating the United States Department of Justice. There was not yet a permanent home for either the attorney general or the Justice Department, and each had occupied a succession of temporary spaces in federal government buildings and privately owned office buildings. While plans to provide the department with its own building were developed as early as 1910, it was not until the late 1920s that significant progress was made toward this goal.

=== 20th century ===
In 1908 and in 1928, Congress authorized the purchase of land in what is now known as the Federal Triangle for departmental offices. The authorization was part of a wave of government construction; the 1926 Public Buildings Act permitted the government to hire private architects for the design of federal buildings, which led to large-scale construction of public buildings, including the development of the 70 acre Federal Triangle site between the Capitol and the White House. Treasury Secretary Andrew W. Mellon and the Board of Architectural Consultants, composed of leading architects and headed by Edward H. Bennett of the Chicago architectural firm of Bennett, Parsons & Frost, developed design guidelines for the site. Under Bennett's direction, each member of the board designed one of the buildings in the Federal Triangle complex to "provide each government agency or bureau with a building that would address its functional needs, while combining the individual buildings into a harmonious, monumental overall design expressive of the dignity and authority of the federal government."

Milton Bennett Medary of the Philadelphia firm Zantzinger, Borie & Medary was selected as the architect for the Department of Justice Building; upon Medary's death in 1929, the project was taken over by his two partners Charles L. Borie Jr. and Clarence C. Zantzinger.

In 1930, Congress appropriated $10 million for the construction of a permanent Department of Justice headquarters in the Federal Triangle. The building was constructed from 1931 to 1934. Upon completion in 1935, the building finally provided a headquarters for the attorney general and Department of Justice. One percent of the cost of its construction was for art; between 1935 and 1941, 68 murals were painted in the building (an example of New Deal art).

In 1966, the Department of Justice building was listed on the National Register of Historic Places as part of the Pennsylvania Avenue National Historic Site.

In 1974, the Federal Bureau of Investigation, which had been headquartered in the same building as the Justice Department, moved into its own headquarters at the J. Edgar Hoover Building across the street on Pennsylvania Avenue. In 1978, the United States Foreign Intelligence Surveillance Court (FISC) was established after the passage of the Foreign Intelligence Surveillance Act. The court of 11 judges appointed by the chief justice of the United States (increased from seven by the USA PATRIOT Act) meets in secret.

=== 21st century ===
From March 1998 to January 2006, major renovations to the building took place, including work on plumbing, electrical wiring, heating and cooling, and elevators. The project included replication of original lighting for the building's corridors and other ornamental spaces. A new $3.1 million conference center and "data room" were built, the main library and executive suites were restored, and a new mechanical, electrical and plumbing (MEP) system was installed. The project's submitting firm and construction manager was the Gilbane Building Company, the architectural firm was Burt Hill Kosar Rittelmann Associates, the structural engineering firm was Delon Hampton Associates, and the mechanical/electrical engineer was H.F. Lenz Company.

Several difficulties were present: The building had to remain operational during renovations, and hazardous materials were involved, with a large-scale asbestos abatement effort, lead paint removal, and the handling of mercury-vapor lamps with PCBs. The Gilbane Building Company established a "stop-work" rule to halt construction when hazardous material was discovered. An additional complication was security concerns, because of sensitive and classified information in the building. According to Building Design & Construction, construction personnel were "classified into three tiers and were permitted access to specific building areas based on these three levels of security clearance." The extensive murals, sculptures, and plaster reliefs in the building were protected with shields during the construction, and temperature, humidity, and dust controls were installed.

The cost of the renovations was $142 million, but the project came in $4.2 million under budget, in part due to significant conservation efforts. Design consultants decided to renovate courtyard plaza and garage structures instead of demolishing them, using 95 percent of existing materials. Cobblestone blocks in the courtyard were "removed, cleaned, refurbished, and reinstalled", with "the foundation of the courtyard's original fountain" being preserved and its pipes and pumps replaced. Further, only the concrete of "questionable integrity around the facility's garage beams" was repaired, instead of having all the concrete replaced. For the plaza deck, the integrity of the concrete structure was tested. Some sections were found to be repairable, preventing them from being rebuilt and diverting 14,520 tons of waste from landfill. Finally, the original foundation and structure building was preserved, which saved 110 tons of waste material and decreased "the risk of penetrating a sensitive waterproofing membrane system." Additional costs were saved through "early buyout": "taking advantage of the purchasing power of the entire four-phase construction job", the construction management firm "was able to secure prices early on in the project that otherwise would have been spent covering the escalating costs of building materials." These measures allowed the GSA to carry out additional work: "restoration and repointing of the limestone exterior", repair and replacement of the roof, restoration of "ornate painting and plaster", further hazardous materials abatement, and fire code upgrades. Ultimately close to $1 million was returned to the GSA.

==== Renaming ====
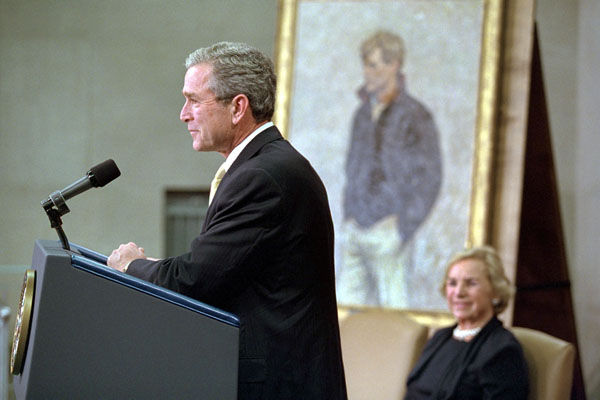
President George W. Bush renames Justice Department building in honor of Robert F. Kennedy on November 20, 2001

In 2001, the Department of Justice Main Building was renamed the Robert F. Kennedy Department of Justice Building in honor of Robert F. Kennedy, who was Attorney General (1961–1964) under his brother, President John F. Kennedy, and his successor, President Lyndon Johnson. Kennedy was later a US senator from New York and presidential candidate until his assassination in 1968. President George W. Bush directed the General Services Administrator to designate the building as the Robert F. Kennedy Department of Justice Building in a presidential memorandum, and gave the rededication address on November 20, 2001, Senator Kennedy's birthday. Attorney General John Ashcroft also rededicated it in a speech at the Justice Department.

The building retains its original facades, lobbies, corridors, library, Great Hall, executive suites, and private offices, including the extensive use of ornamental aluminum.

== Design ==
The design by Zantzinger, Borie, and Medary blends influences from neoclassical (Greek Revival) and Art Deco architectural styles. The design is similar to other Federal Triangle buildings, with an Indiana limestone facade over a steel frame, red-tile hip roof, and colonnades, as well as interior courtyards to provide natural light and ventilation. The inscription on one of the sides of the Robert F. Kennedy Department of Justice Building is, "Justice is founded in the rights bestowed by nature upon man. Liberty is maintained in security of justice."

It is distinguished from other Federal Triangle buildings by Art Deco elements and the innovative use of aluminum for details that were traditionally cast in bronze. The General Bronze Corporation, known for New York City's Mies van der Rohe-designed Seagram Building, the Atlas and Prometheus bronze sculptures in Rockefeller Center, the bronze doors for the United States Supreme Court and Commerce buildings, the aluminum windows for the United Nations Secretariat, Chase Manhattan Bank, and the Tripler Army Base Hospital was chosen for supplying the aluminum and bronze for the building's design. All entrances to the building feature 20-foot (6.1 m)-high aluminum doors that slide into recessed pockets. Interior stair railings, grillwork, and door trim are aluminum, as are Art Deco torchieres, doors for the building's 25 elevators, and more than 10,000 light fixtures.

The building has many distinctive interior spaces, including the Great Hall entry foyer and the Law Library. The two-story Great Hall features Art Deco light fixtures and a terra-cotta tile floor with gray marble borders. The Law Library, located on the fifth floor, is a two-story room distinguished by a pair of tall Art Deco lights and a 20-panel mural by Maurice Sterne.

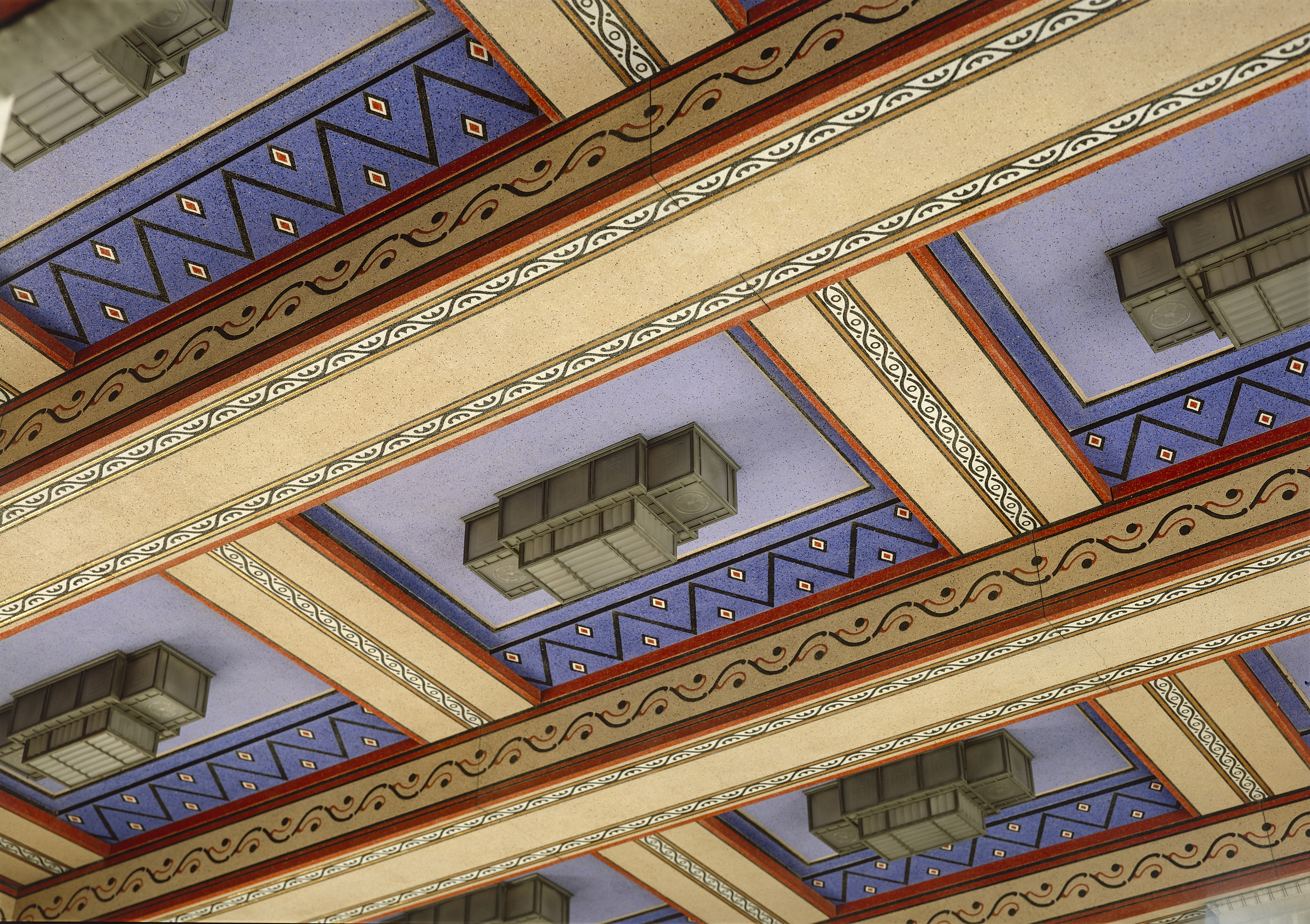
Polychromatic aggregate ceiling mosaic by John Joseph Earley, completed in 1935

The two-story main library with Maurice Sterne's mural series Man's Struggle for Justice, completed in 1939

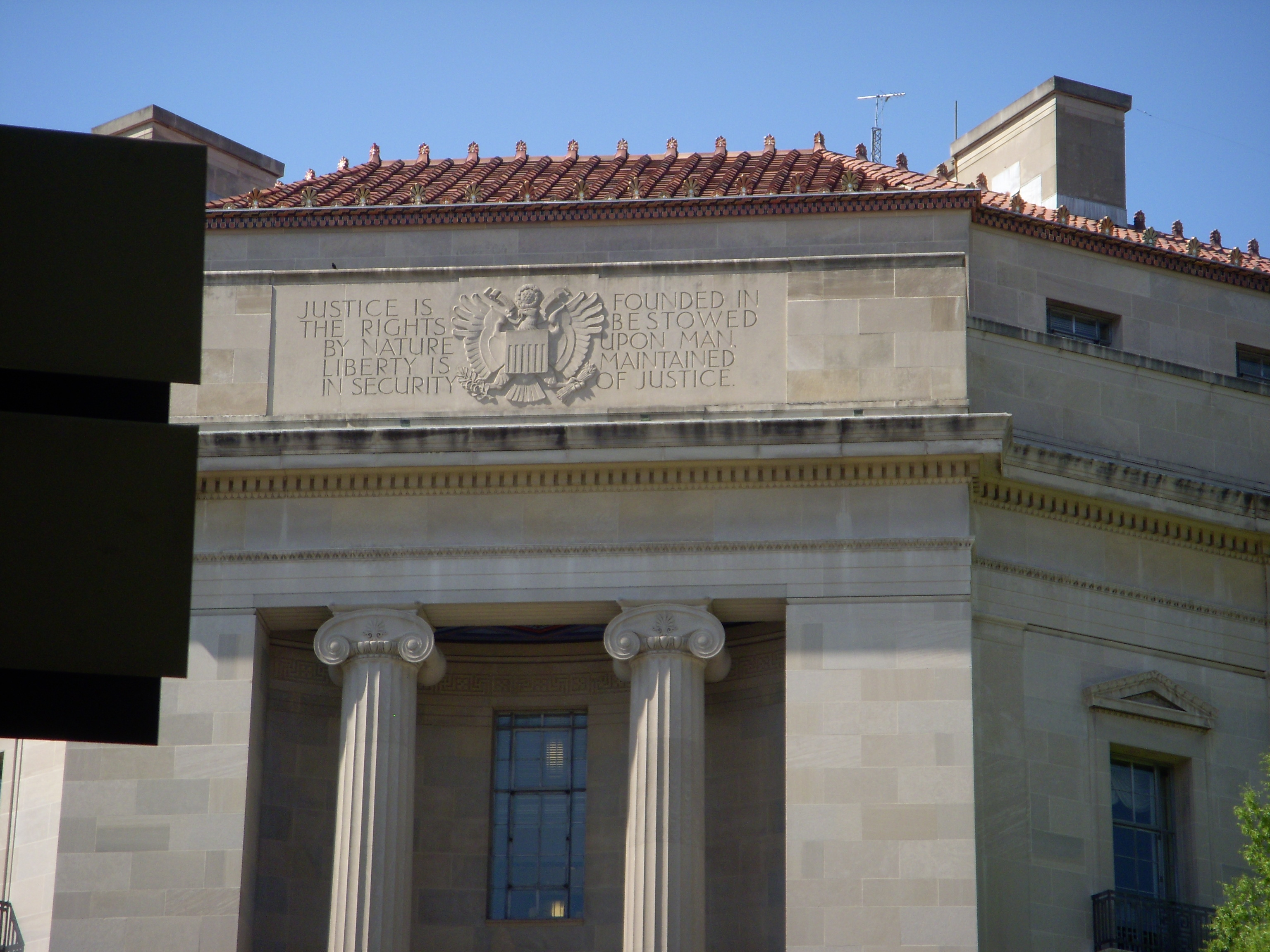
Façade of the building showing the inscription

== Art ==
The building contains the largest historic art collection of any General Services Administration–built facility. Sculpture is integrated into the fabric of the building. Sculptor C. Paul Jennewein was selected to create a unified design concept for the building's exterior and interior spaces, designing 57 sculptural elements for the building. His work ranged from the carved limestone figures for the pediments on the Constitution Avenue facade, to the aluminum Art Deco torchieres and light fixtures throughout the interior. To ensure the themes of the artwork reflected the role of the department within American democracy, Jennewein hired philosopher Hartley Burr Alexander.

The interior of the US Department of Justice building contains many decorative wall paintings. The building's extensive murals depict scenes of daily life from throughout American history and symbolic interpretations or allegories relating to the role of justice in American society. In all, 68 murals were completed between 1935 and 1941, at a cost of $68,000, one percent of the cost of the building. Mural artists include George Biddle, Henry Varnum Poor, John Steuart Curry, Boardman Robinson, Emil Bisttram and Leon Kroll.

The striking, colorful concrete mosaics on the ceilings of the vehicular and pedestrian entryways from 9th and 10th Streets were created by the Washington, D.C. master craftsman John Joseph Earley, an innovator in the aesthetic applications of the material. Visible from the street, these mosaics retain much of the brilliance of their original colors. A sculpture of the Revolutionary War hero Nathan Hale by Bela Pratt stands on the southern side of the building.

=== Spirit of Justice ===
Spirit of Justice, a 1936 statue

Spirit of Justice is a cast aluminum Art Deco statue designed by Jennewein. It depicts Lady Justice, a woman wearing a toga-like dress with one breast revealed and arms raised, and stands on display along with its male counterpart Majesty of Law in the Great Hall. Unlike many representations of Lady Justice, Spirit of Justice wears no blindfold to symbolize blind justice. The statue measures 12.5 feet (150 inches) and was commissioned in 1933 at a cost of $7000, and has stood with Majesty of Law in the Great Hall since 1936.

==== Controversy ====
In 1986, the statue was seen behind then–US attorney general Edwin Meese during a press conference as he discussed the final report of the Attorney General's Commission on Pornography, also known as the Meese Report. According to the Associated Press, "photographers dived to the floor to capture the image of him raising the report in the air, with the partially nude female statue behind him".

In 2002, under Attorney General John Ashcroft, curtains were famously put up blocking the bare-breasted statue from view during speeches. According to Justice Department spokesman Shane Hix, the department spent $8,000 to purchase blue drapes to hide them. Under Ashcroft the department had previously rented blue drapes at a cost of $2,000 every time the agency had a formal event. ABC News reported that Ashcroft had ordered the statues covered because he did not like being photographed in front of them, but Hix insisted that the attorney general was not aware of the change and that the nudity on the statue was not the reason for the purchase, citing instead "aesthetic" reasons, such as the background for television cameras.

Internal e-mails later surfaced, referring to "hiding the statues" and "the episode was quickly seized upon by pundits and satirists as a symbol of Ashcroft's allegedly puritanical and censorious bearing." Journalist and writer Claire Braz-Valentine wrote an open lyrical letter to Ashcroft, which included the lines "John, John, John,/you've got your priorities all wrong." Ashcroft joked about the incident on the Late Show with David Letterman in April 2002. In May 2007, the "Inside Washington" column in National Journal reported that Monica Goodling, a former aide to Ashcroft, was responsible for the covering of the statue. The curtains were removed on June 24, 2005, under Ashcroft's successor Alberto Gonzales. Justice Department spokesman Kevin Madden was quoted as saying that "the decision to remove the drapes was made by Paul Corts, assistant attorney general for administration, and that Attorney General Alberto R. Gonzales 'agreed with the recommendation.'"
