= Washington Bar Association =

American legal group

The Washington Bar Association (WBA) is a voluntary bar association located in the Washington, District of Columbia area, whose members are predominantly African-American attorneys.

The Washington Bar Association was founded in 1925 by a group of prominent African-American attorneys, including Charles Hamilton Houston, George E.C. Hayes, and J. Franklin Wilson.

The WBA was created simultaneously with the National Bar Association, and is an affiliate chapter of the NBA.

The WBA works to advance Houstonian jurisprudence, defined as "Social change through application of laws governing equal rights, due process, and other legal principles."

The organization serves to protect and advance the interests of its members and of all African-Americans as they navigate a social and judicial system in which disparate treatment of minorities continues to occur.

In 1975, the WBA established the tradition of awarding the Houston Medallion of Merit to individuals who have demonstrated a commitment to Charles Hamilton Houston's ideals and jurisprudence. This award is presented at the WBA's annual Law Day Gala.
