= Spirit of Justice =

Statue in Washington D.C.

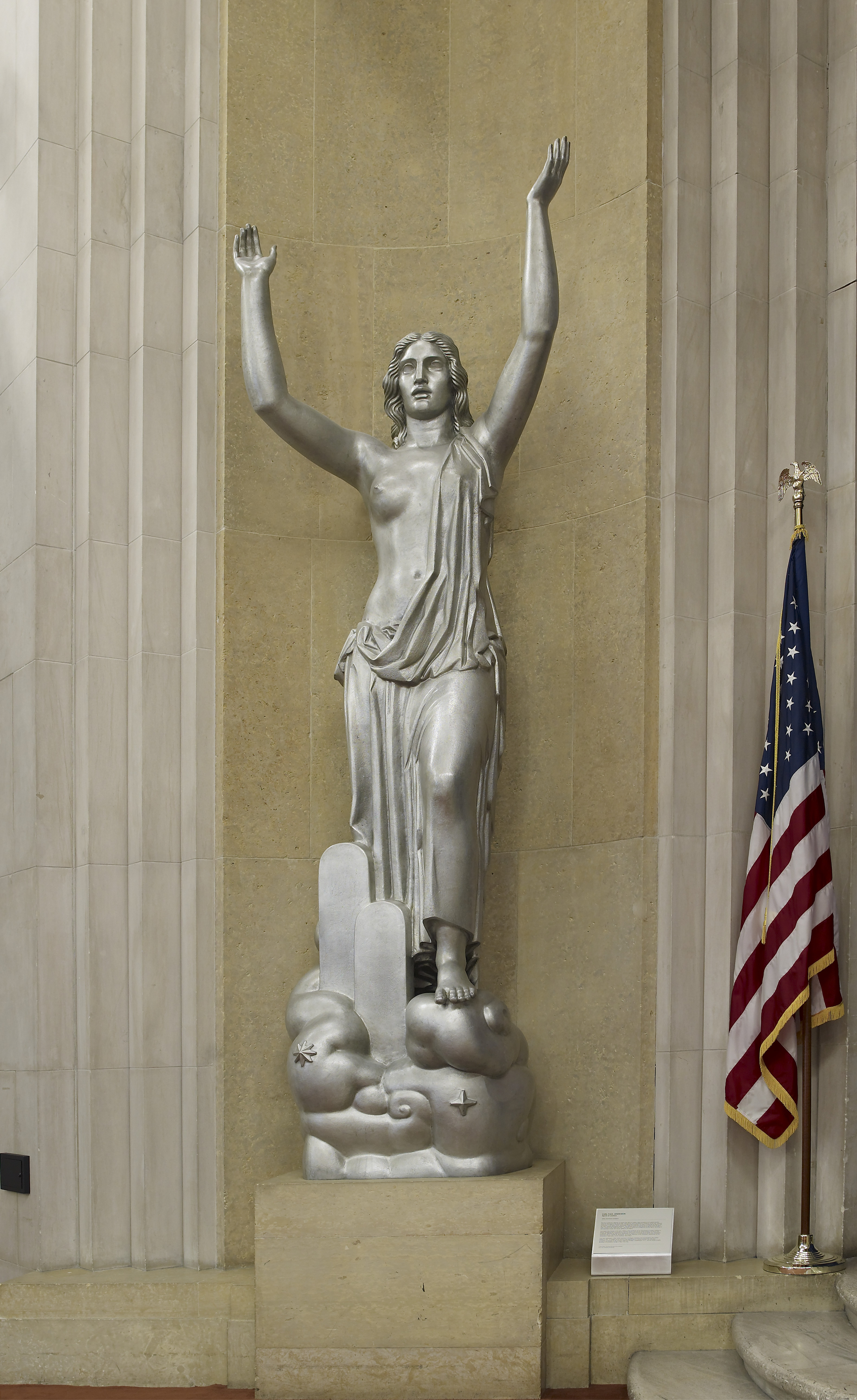
- Artist: C. Paul Jennewein
- Year: 1933
- Type: sculpture
- Dimensions: 380 cm (150 in)
- Location: Washington, D.C.
- Owner: United States Department of Justice

Spirit of Justice is a 1933 cast aluminum statue depicting Lady Justice that stands on display along with its male counterpart Majesty of Justice in the Great Hall of the Robert F. Kennedy Department of Justice Building in Washington, D.C., the headquarters of the U.S. Department of Justice. The statue is of a woman wearing a toga-like dress with one breast revealed and arms raised and measures 12.5 feet (3.8 meters).

== History ==
The statue was commissioned in 1933 at a cost of $7,275 (equivalent to $180,900 in 2025), and was created by C. Paul Jennewein, who created a total of 57 sculptural elements for the building. Like most of the artwork and fixtures in the building, it is in an Art Deco style. Unlike many representations of Lady Justice, Spirit of Justice wears no blindfold, which is often utilized to symbolize blind justice.

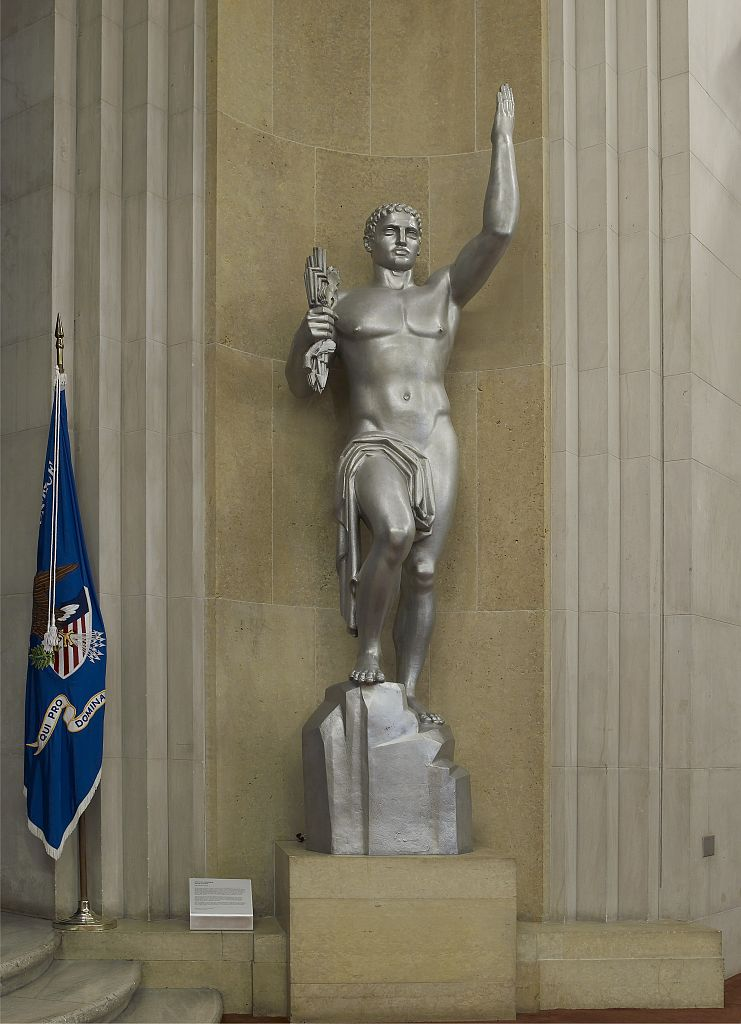
Majesty of Justice

The male statue, Majesty of Justice, is bare-chested.

The entrance to the Rayburn House Office Building also features a sculpture entitled The Majesty of the Law.

== Spirit of Justice and the Attorneys General ==
- In 1986, the statue was seen behind then–Attorney General Edwin Meese III as he discussed a report on pornography.
- In 2002, under John Ashcroft, curtains were installed blocking the statue from view during speeches. The curtains were first used on a rental basis during the administration of Dick Thornburgh. Justice officials long insisted that the curtains were put up to improve the room's use as a television backdrop and that Ashcroft had nothing to do with it. Ashcroft's successor, Alberto Gonzales, removed the curtains in June 2005.
- On May 7, 2007, National Journal's "Inside Washington" column reported that it was Monica Goodling who ordered drapes to be placed over the partially nude Spirit of Justice statue during Ashcroft's tenure as Attorney General. At the time, the department spent $8,000 on blue drapes to hide the two aluminum statues, according to spokesman Shane Hix.

== Popular culture ==
American singer-songwriter Tom Paxton wrote a humorous song entitled "John Ashcroft and the Spirit of Justice", inspired by the Attorney General's alleged covering of the statue, in 2002.

== See also ==
- List of public art in Washington, D.C., Ward 6
