= United States Court of Military Appeals (building) =

- U.S. National Register of Historic Places
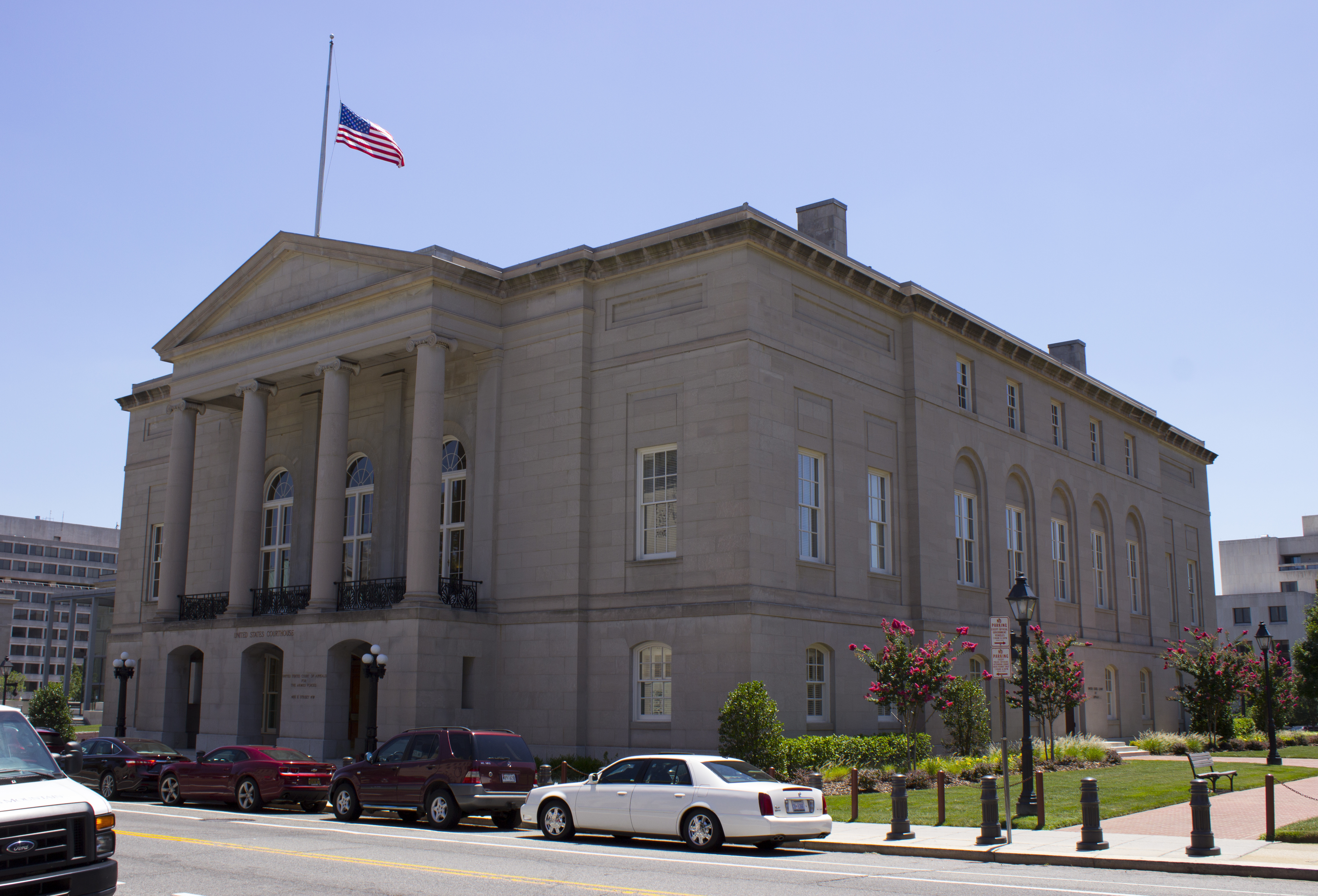
- U.S. Court of Military Appeals building in 2015

- Location within Central Washington, D.C. Location within the District of Columbia Location within the United States
- Location: 450 E St., NW., Washington, D.C.
- Coordinates: 38.8958°N 77.0183°W
- Built: 1910
- Architect: Elliot Woods
- NRHP reference No.: 74002174
- Added to NRHP: January 21, 1974

The building of the United States Court of Military Appeals, formerly known as the District of Columbia Court of Appeals, is a historic building located at 450 E St., Northwest, Washington, D.C. It is regarded as "a particularly fine and remarkably early example of revived (20th century) Greek Revival architecture."

== History ==
The building was completed in 1910. It served as the D.C. Court of Appeals until 1952, when the U.S. Court of Military Appeals took it over. It was designed by the Architect of the Capitol, Elliott Woods, to be compatible with the Washington City Hall (1820), designed by George Hadfield and Robert Mills.

It was listed on the National Register of Historic Places in 1974.

When nominated in 1973, it was serving the United States Court of Appeals for the Armed Forces.
