= 1860 Democratic National Conventions =

Series of American presidential nominating conventions

1860 Democratic National Convention
- 1860 presidential election
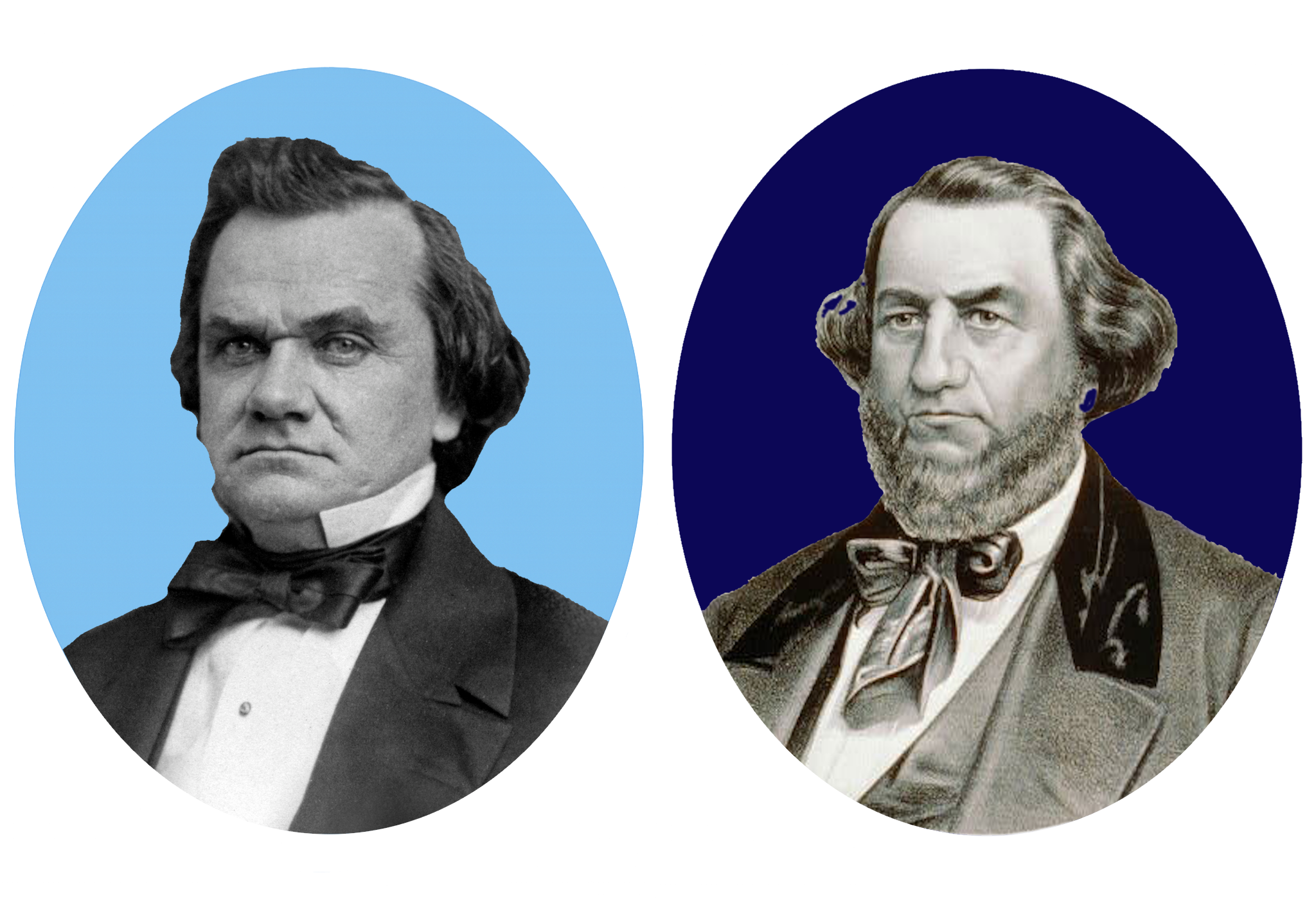
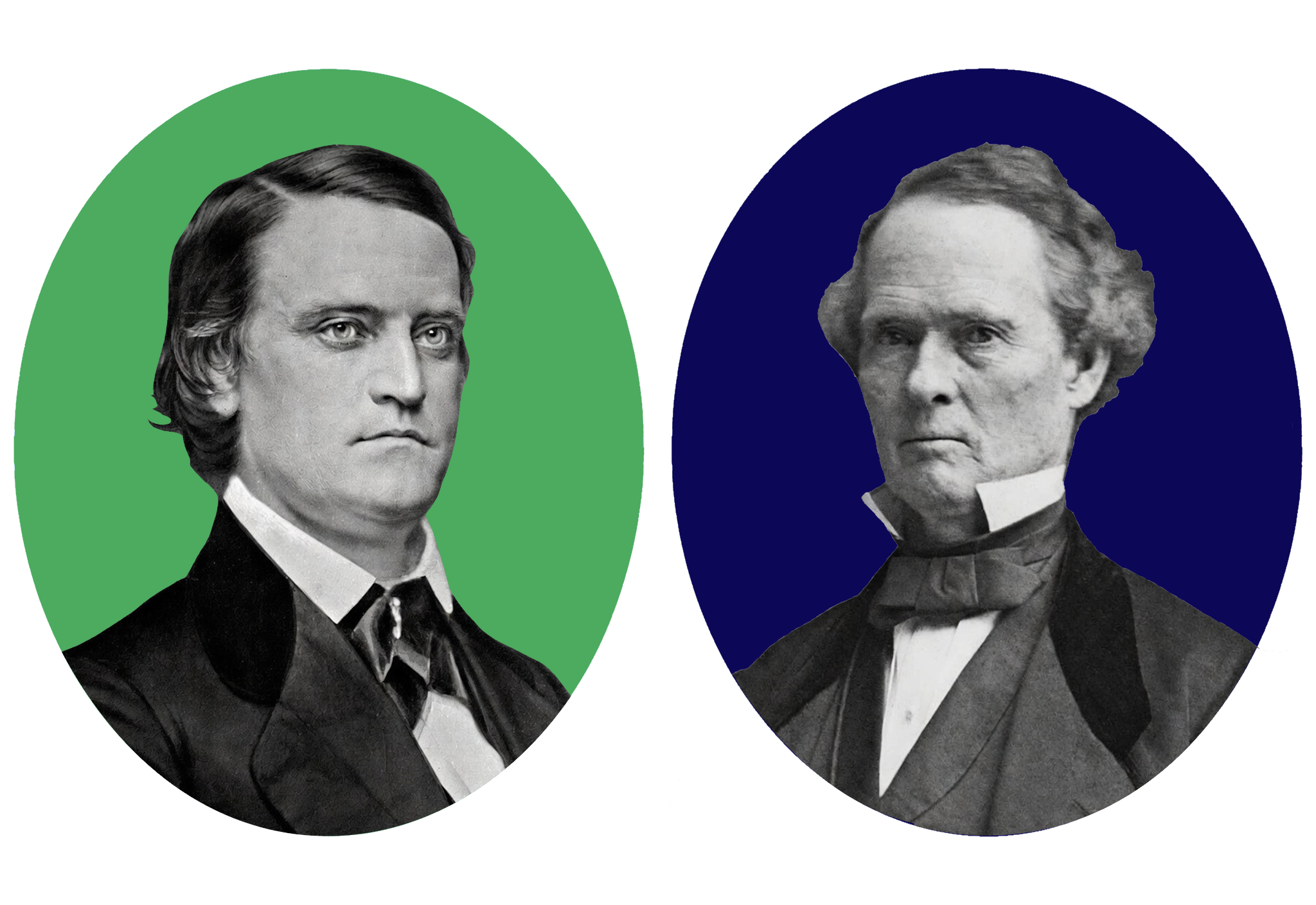

Convention
- Dates: April 23–May 3, 1860 & June 18–23, 1860
- City: Charleston, South Carolina; Richmond, Virginia & Baltimore, Maryland
- Venue: South Carolina Institute Hall, Charleston, St. Andrews Hall, Charleston (southern), Military Hall, Charleston, (southern); Metropolitan Hall, Richmond, (southern); Front Street Theater, Baltimore & Maryland Institute, Baltimore (Southern)

Candidates
- Presidential nominee: Stephen A. Douglas of Illinois (Northern); John C. Breckinridge of Kentucky (Southern)
- Vice-presidential nominee: Herschel V. Johnson of Georgia (Northern); Joseph Lane of Oregon (Southern)

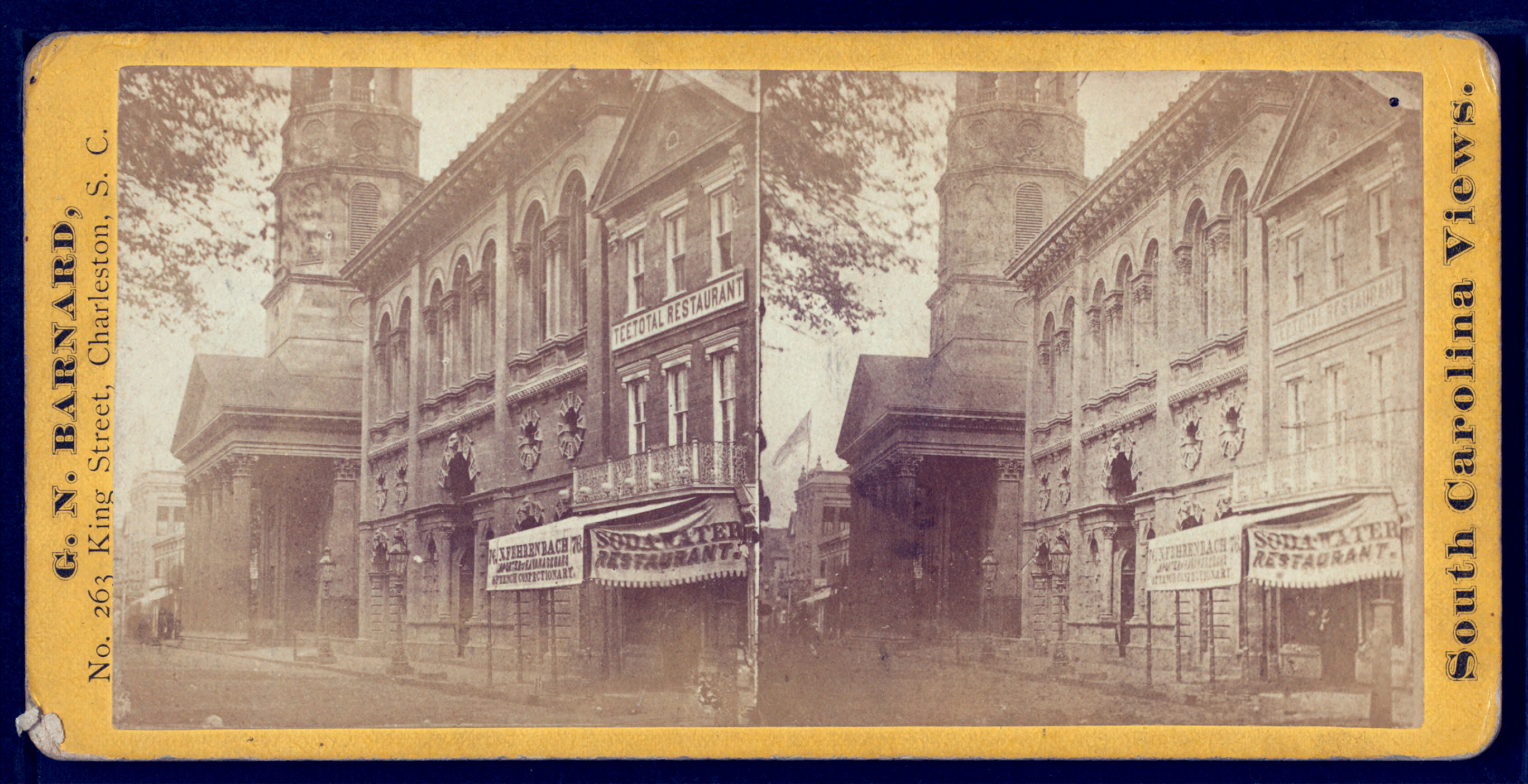
Stereoscopic image of South Carolina Institute Hall by George Norman Barnard

The 1860 Democratic National Conventions were a series of presidential nominating conventions held to nominate the Democratic Party's candidates for president and vice president in the 1860 election.

The first convention, held from April 23 to May 3 in Charleston, South Carolina, deadlocked after failing to nominate a ticket: two subsequent conventions, both held in Baltimore, Maryland in June, ultimately nominated separate presidential tickets.

Senator Stephen A. Douglas of Illinois entered the Charleston convention as the front-runner for the presidential nomination, and while he won a majority on the first presidential ballot of the convention, convention rules at the time required a two-thirds majority to win the nomination, with Douglas' adherence to the Freeport Doctrine regarding slavery in the territories engendering strong opposition from many Southern delegates. Opponents of Douglas's nomination spread their support among five major candidates, including former Treasury Secretary James Guthrie of Kentucky and Senator Robert M. T. Hunter of Virginia.

After 57 ballots over a span of two days, in which Douglas consistently won at least half of the delegates, the Charleston convention adjourned when it became apparent no candidate could secure the required two-thirds of all votes.

The Democratic convention reconvened in Baltimore on June 18, but many Southern delegates were either excluded from the convention or refused to participate. The convention adopted a platform in which it pledged to abide by the decision of the Supreme Court of the United States upon questions of Constitutional Law regarding slavery.

Douglas was ultimately nominated for president on the second ballot (the 59th ballot overall). Senator Benjamin Fitzpatrick of Alabama was nominated for vice president, but he refused the nomination, and was replaced by former Governor Herschel V. Johnson of Georgia.

The Southern Democrats who had boycotted, or walked out of, the Baltimore convention held their own separate convention and adopted a pro-slavery platform, and nominated incumbent Vice President John C. Breckinridge for president, with Senator Joseph Lane of Oregon as vice president.

While Douglas and Breckinridge received a combined 47.62% of the popular vote in the 1860 presidential election, they lost the election to Republican candidate Abraham Lincoln.

== Charleston convention ==
=== Background ===
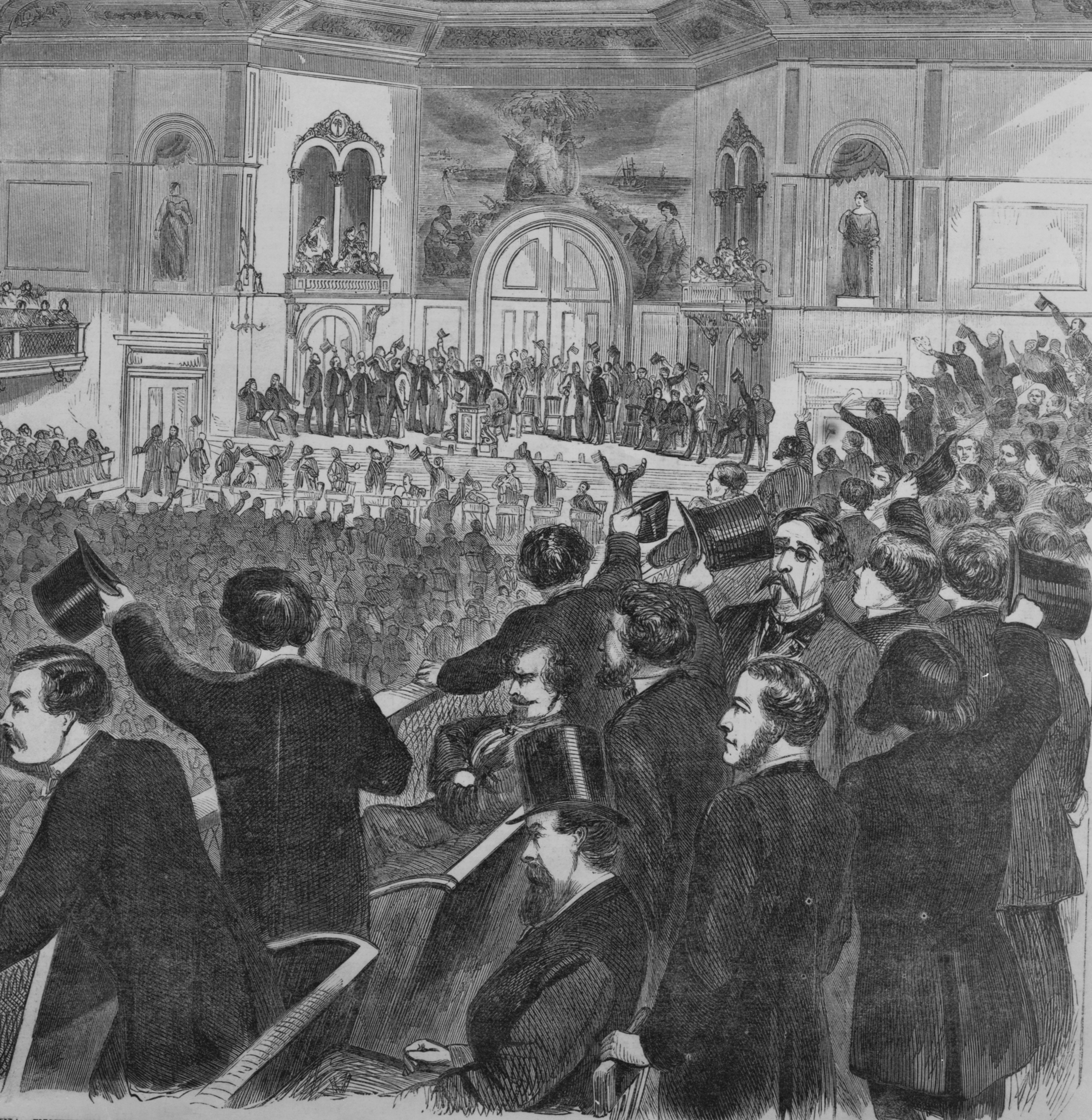
Wood engraving illustrating the Charleston convention

The front-runner for the nomination was Douglas, who was considered a moderate on the slavery issue. With the 1854 Kansas–Nebraska Act, he advanced the doctrine of popular sovereignty: allowing settlers in each Territory to decide for themselves whether slavery would be allowed—a change from the flat prohibition of slavery in most Territories under the Missouri Compromise, which the South had welcomed. However, the Supreme Court’s ensuing 1857 'Dred Scott' decision declared that the Constitution protected slavery in all Territories.

Douglas was challenged for his Senate seat by Abraham Lincoln in 1858, and narrowly won re-election, after the Lincoln-Douglas debates, by professing the Freeport Doctrine, a de facto rejection of Dred Scott, with militant Southern "Fire-Eaters", such as William Yancey of Alabama, opposing him as a traitor. Many of them openly predicted a split in the party and the election of Republican front-runner William H. Seward.

The 1860 Democratic National Convention convened at South Carolina Institute Hall (destroyed in the Great Fire of 1861) in Charleston, South Carolina, on April 23, 1860: the galleries at the convention were packed with pro-slavery spectators.

=== Party platform disputes ===
Urged by Yancey, the delegations from seven Deep South states (Alabama, Arkansas, Florida, Georgia, Louisiana, Mississippi, and Texas) met in a separate caucus before the convention. They reached a tentative consensus to "stop Douglas" by imposing a pro-slavery party platform which he could not run on if nominated.

The "Fire-eater" majority on the convention's platform committee, chaired by William Waightstill Avery of North Carolina, produced an explicitly pro-slavery document, endorsing Dred Scott and Congressional legislation protecting slavery in the territories. Northern Democrats refused to acquiesce, as Dred Scott was extremely unpopular in the North, and the Northerners said they could not carry a single state with that platform: this would end any Democratic prospect of retaining the White House, as no previous candidate had won the presidency without winning either New York or Pennsylvania, and only four (John Adams in 1796, James Madison in 1812, John Quincy Adams in 1824, and James Buchanan in 1856) had been elected without winning both. Douglas and supporters thus preferred the 1856 Cincinnati platform.

On April 30, the minority (Northern) report was substituted for that of the majority (Southern) report by a vote of 165 to 138. The question next in order before the convention was upon the adoption of the second resolution of the minority of the committee: on this question Alabama, Arkansas, one of Delaware's delegates, Florida, Georgia, Louisiana, Mississippi, and Texas refused to vote. The Douglas party abandoned the vague second resolution, and it was defeated by an overwhelming vote of 238 to 21 (with 44 abstentions).

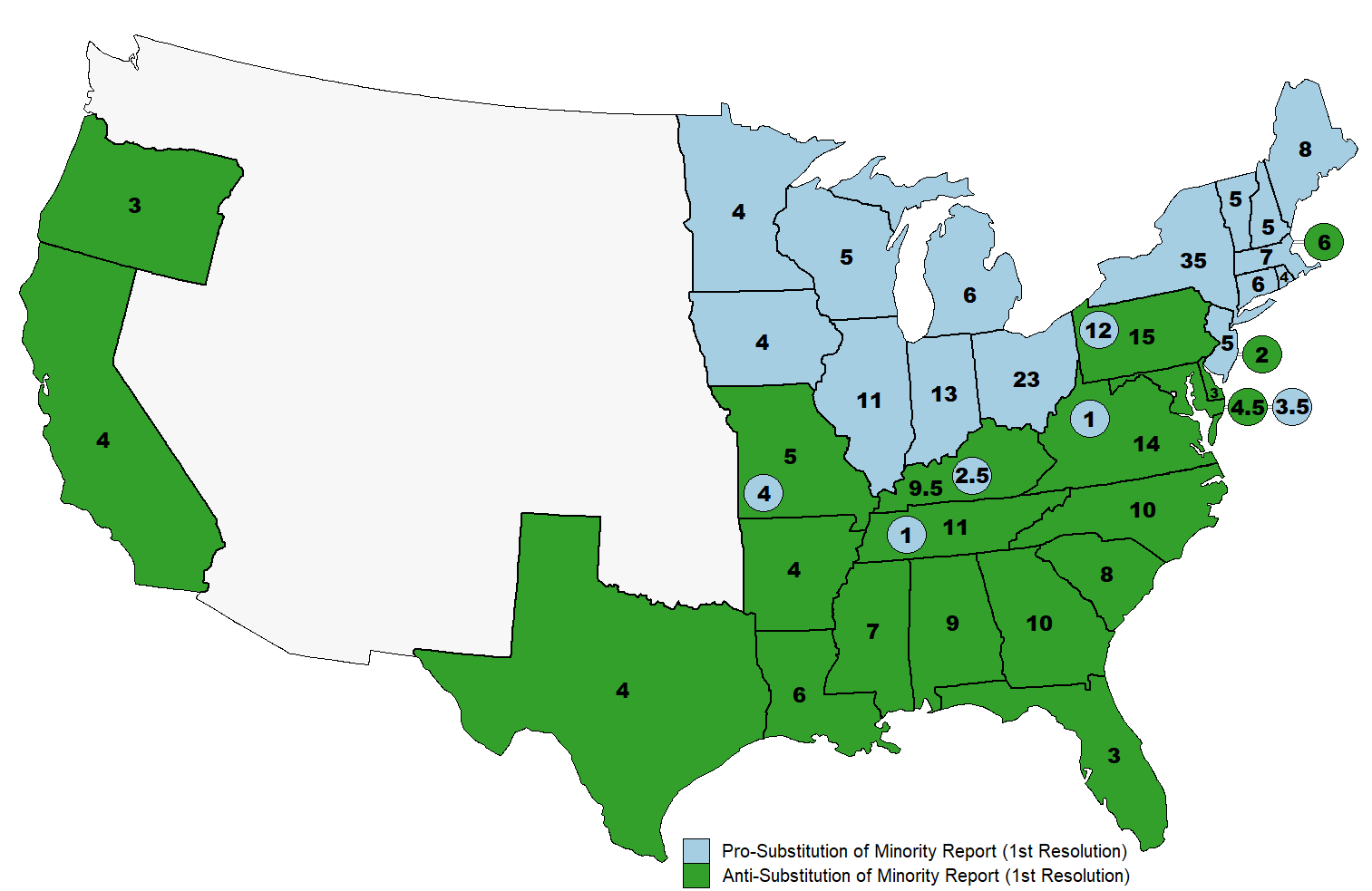
Minority Report Substitution Vote

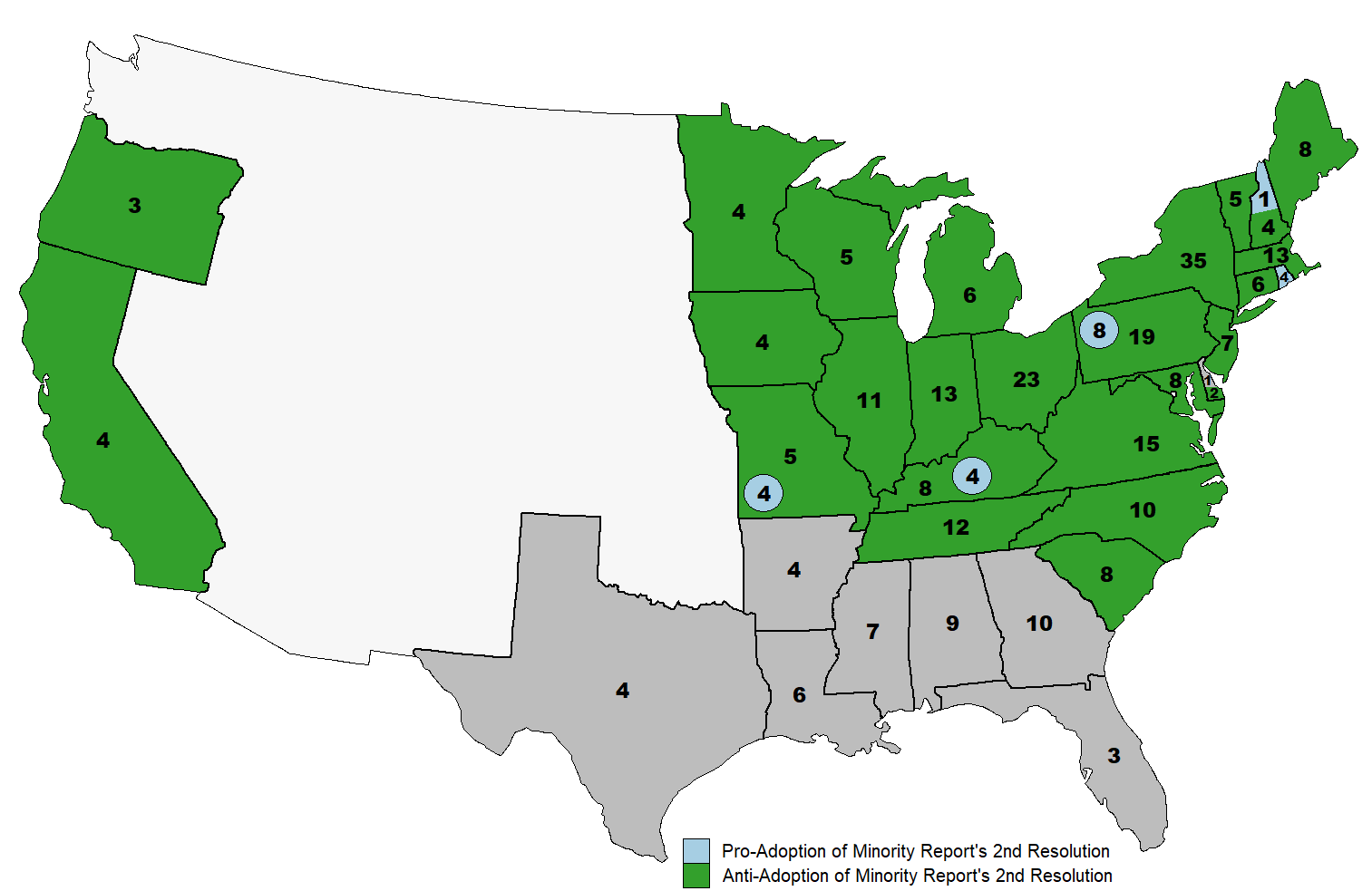
Minority Report
2nd Resolution Vote

Between April 30 and May 1, 51 Southern delegates walked out of the convention in protest: the entire delegations of Alabama, Florida, Georgia, Louisiana, Mississippi, South Carolina and Texas, three of the four delegates from Arkansas and one of the three delegates from Delaware. These delegates gathered at St. Andrews Hall on Broad Street (Note: Murat Halstead reports that the southern delegates met at St. Andrews Hall immediately after the walk-out, but that their actual proceedings afterward occurred at Military Hall.) and declared themselves the real convention as the Institute Hall convention proceeded to nominations.

Since both the majority and the minority resolutions on the Territorial question were rejected, nothing remained except the Cincinnati platform as the Douglas faction had desired. The dominant Douglas forces believed their path was now clear.

=== Two-thirds rule ===
Before the balloting for president commenced, Mr. Howard of Tennessee succeeded in obtaining a vote of the convention in affirmance of the two-thirds rule: on his motion they resolved, by 141 votes to 112, "that the President of the Convention be and he is hereby directed not to declare any person nominated for the office of President or Vice President unless he shall have received a number of votes equal to two-thirds of the votes of all the Electoral Colleges."

It was well known at the time that this resolution would render the regular nomination of Douglas impossible.

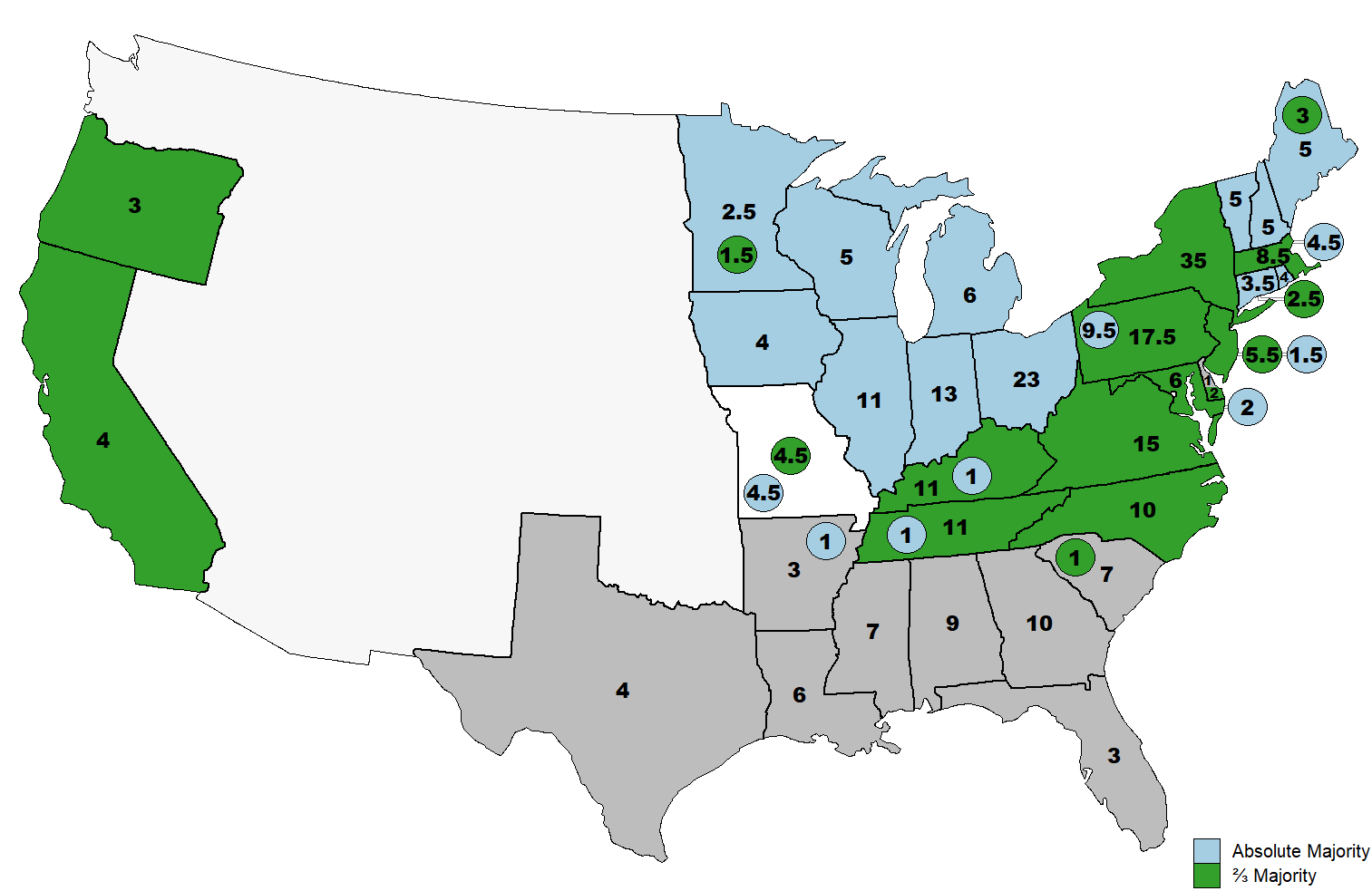
Two-Thirds Rule Vote

=== Presidential balloting ===
Six major candidates were nominated at the convention: Douglas, former Treasury Secretary James Guthrie of Kentucky, Senator Robert M. T. Hunter of Virginia, Senator Joseph Lane of Oregon, former Senator Daniel S. Dickinson of New York, and Senator Andrew Johnson of Tennessee.

==== Presidential candidates ====
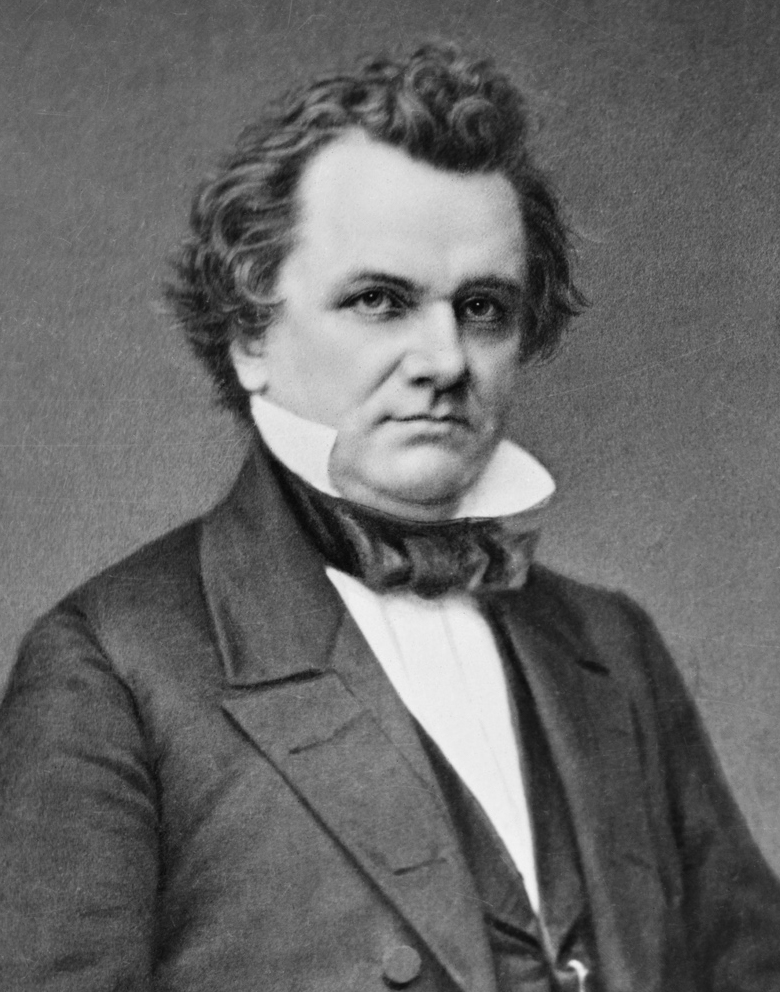
Senator Stephen A. Douglas of Illinois

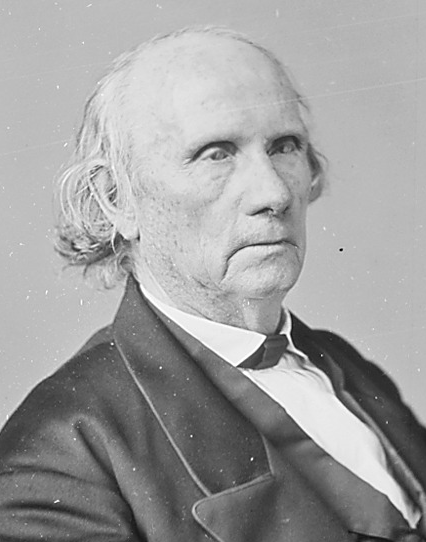
Former Secretary of the Treasury James Guthrie of Kentucky

Senator Robert M. T. Hunter of Virginia

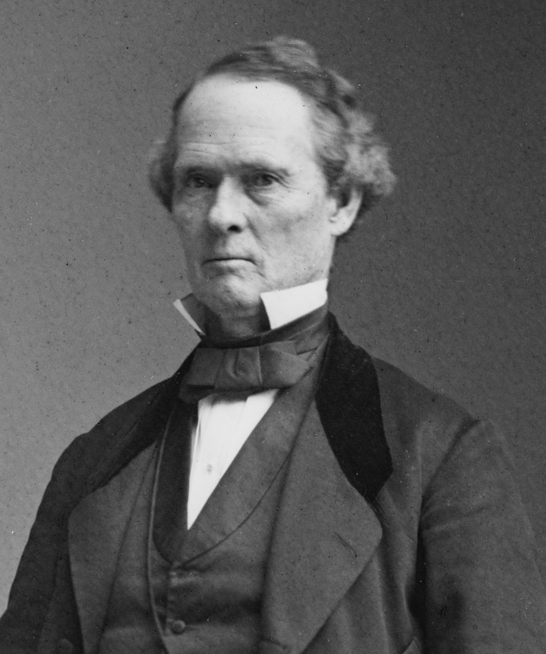
Senator Joseph Lane of Oregon

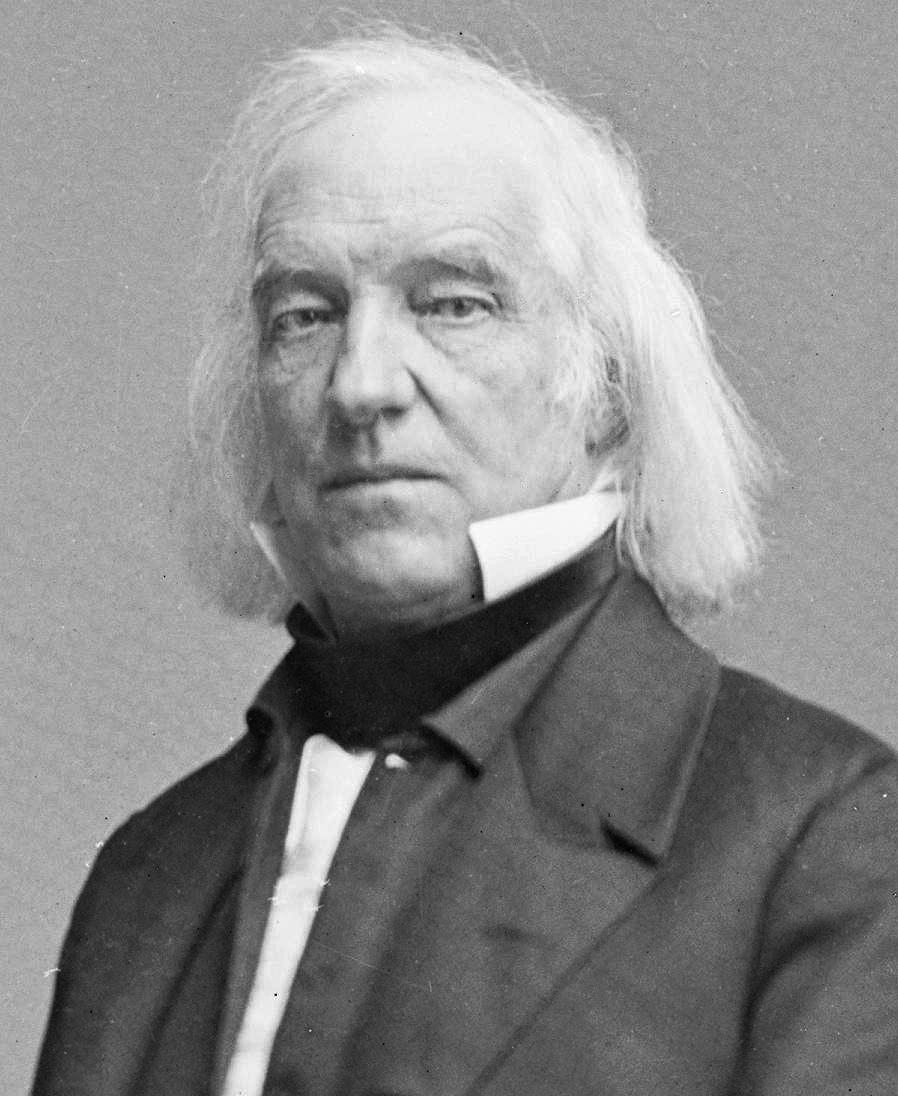
Former Senator Daniel S. Dickinson of New York

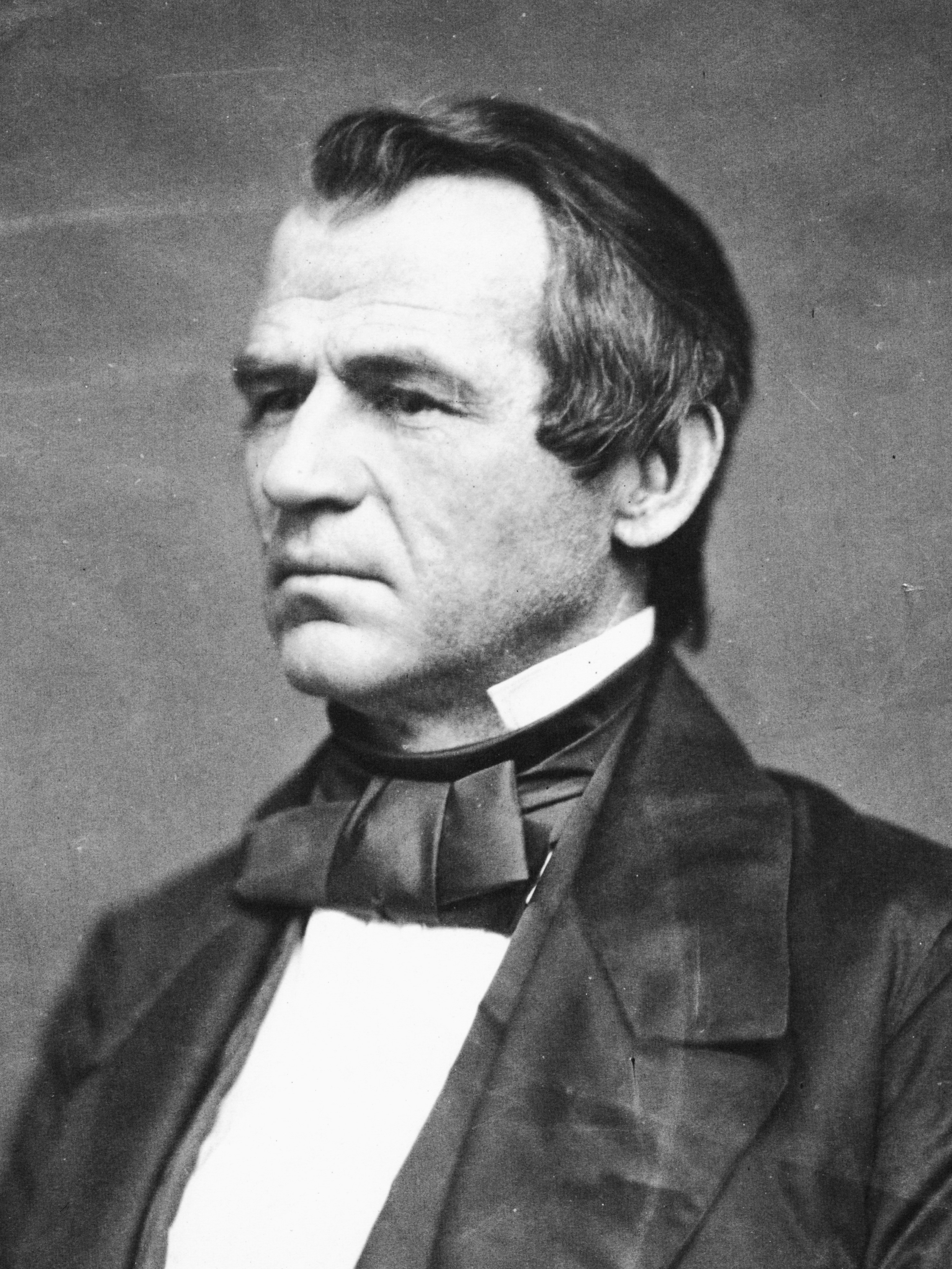
Senator Andrew Johnson of Tennessee

While Douglas led on the first ballot, receiving 145 1/2 of the 253 votes cast, the convention had required a two-thirds vote to win the nomination: further to this, convention chairman Caleb Cushing ruled that this was two-thirds of the whole membership, not two-thirds of those present and voting.

This ruling meant Douglas needed 202 votes (56 1/2 more votes), or 80% of the remaining 253 delegates: this was all but impossible as it would have required several of the remaining Southern delegates to vote for Douglas, who they vehemently opposed.

Consequently, the convention held 57 ballots, and though Douglas led on all of them, he never received more than 152 1/2 votes. On the 57th ballot, Douglas received 151 1/2 votes, still 50 1/2 votes short of the nomination, though far ahead of Guthrie, who was second with 65 1/2. On 3 May, the delegates voted to adjourn the convention, and reconvene in Baltimore six weeks later.

A few votes went to former Senator Isaac Toucey of Connecticut and Senator James Pearce of Maryland, while Senator Jefferson Davis of Mississippi (the future Confederate President) received one vote on over fifty ballots from Benjamin Butler of Massachusetts. Ironically, during the Civil War, Butler became a Union general, and Davis ordered him hanged as a criminal if he was captured.

Presidential Ballot
	1st	2nd	3rd	4th	5th	6th	7th	8th	9th	10th	11th	12th	13th	14th	15th	16th	17th	18th	19th	20th	21st	22nd
Douglas	145.5	147	148.5	149	149.5	149.5	150.5	150.5	150	150.5	150.5	150.5	149.5	150	150	150	150	150	150	150	150.5	150.5
Guthrie	35.5	36.5	37	37.5	37.5	39.5	38.5	38.5	41.5	39.5	39.5	39.5	39.5	41	41.5	42	42	41.5	41.5	42	41.5	41.5
Hunter	42	41.5	41	41.5	41	41	41	40.5	40.5	39	38	38	28.5	27	26.5	26	26	26	26	26	26	26
Lane	6	6	6	6	6	7	6	6	6	5.5	6.5	6.5	20	20.5	20.5	20.5	20.5	20.5	20.5	20.5	20.5	20.5
Dickinson	7	6.5	6.5	5	5	3	4	4.5	1	4	4	4	1	0.5	0.5	0.5	0.5	1	1	0.5	0.5	0.5
Johnson	12	12	12	12	12	12	11	11	12	12	12	12	12	12	12	12	12	12	12	12	12	12
Toucey	2.5	2.5	0	0	0	0	0	0	0	0	0	0	0	0	0	0	0	0	0	0	0	0
Davis	1.5	1	1	1	1	0	1	1	1	1.5	1.5	1.5	1.5	1	1	1	1	1	1	1	1	1
Pearce	1	0	0	0	0	0	0	0	0	0	0	0	0	0	0	0	0	0	0	0	0	0
Withdrawn	50	50	51	51	51	51	51	51	51	51	51	51	51	51	51	51	51	51	51	51	51	51

Presidential Ballot
	23rd	24th	25th	26th	27th	28th	29th	30th	31st	32nd	33rd	34th	35th	36th	37th	38th	39th	40th	41st	42nd
Douglas	152.5	151.5	151.5	151.5	151.5	151.5	151.5	151.5	151.5	152.5	152.5	152.5	152	151.5	151.5	151.5	151.5	151.5	151.5	151.5
Guthrie	41.5	41.5	41.5	41.5	42.5	42	42	45	47.5	47.5	47.5	47.5	47.5	48	64.5	66	66.5	66.5	66.5	66.5
Hunter	25	25	35	25	25	25	25	25	32.5	22.5	22.5	22.5	22	22	16	16	16	16	16	16
Lane	19.5	19.5	9.5	9	8	8	7.5	5.5	5.5	14.5	14.5	12.5	13	13	12.5	13	12.5	12.5	13	13
Dickinson	0.5	1.5	1.5	12	12	12.5	13	13	3	3	3	5	4.5	4.5	5.5	5.5	5.5	5.5	5	5
Johnson	12	12	12	12	12	12	12	11	11	11	11	11	12	12	0.5	0	0	0	0	0
Davis	1	1	1	1	1	1	1	1	1	1	1	1	1	1	1.5	0	0	0	0	0
Withdrawn	51	51	51	51	51	51	51	51	51	51	51	51	51	51	51	51	51	51	51	51

Presidential Ballot
	43rd	44th	45th	46th	47th	48th	49th	50th	51st	52nd	53rd	54th	55th	56th	57th
Douglas	151.5	151.5	151.5	151.5	151.5	151.5	151.5	151.5	151.5	151.5	151.5	151.5	151.5	151.5	151.5
Guthrie	65.5	65.5	65.5	65.5	65.5	65.5	65.5	65.5	65.5	65.5	65.5	61	65.5	65.5	65.5
Hunter	16	16	16	16	16	16	16	16	16	16	16	20.5	16	16	16
Lane	13	13	13	13	13	13	14	14	14	14	14	16	14	14	14
Dickinson	5	5	5	5	5	5	4	4	4	4	4	2	4	4	4
Davis	1	1	1	1	1	1	1	1	1	1	1	1	1	1	1
Withdrawn	51	51	51	51	51	51	51	51	51	51	51	51	51	51	51

1st Day of Presidential Balloting / 8th Day of Convention (Tuesday, May 1, 1860)

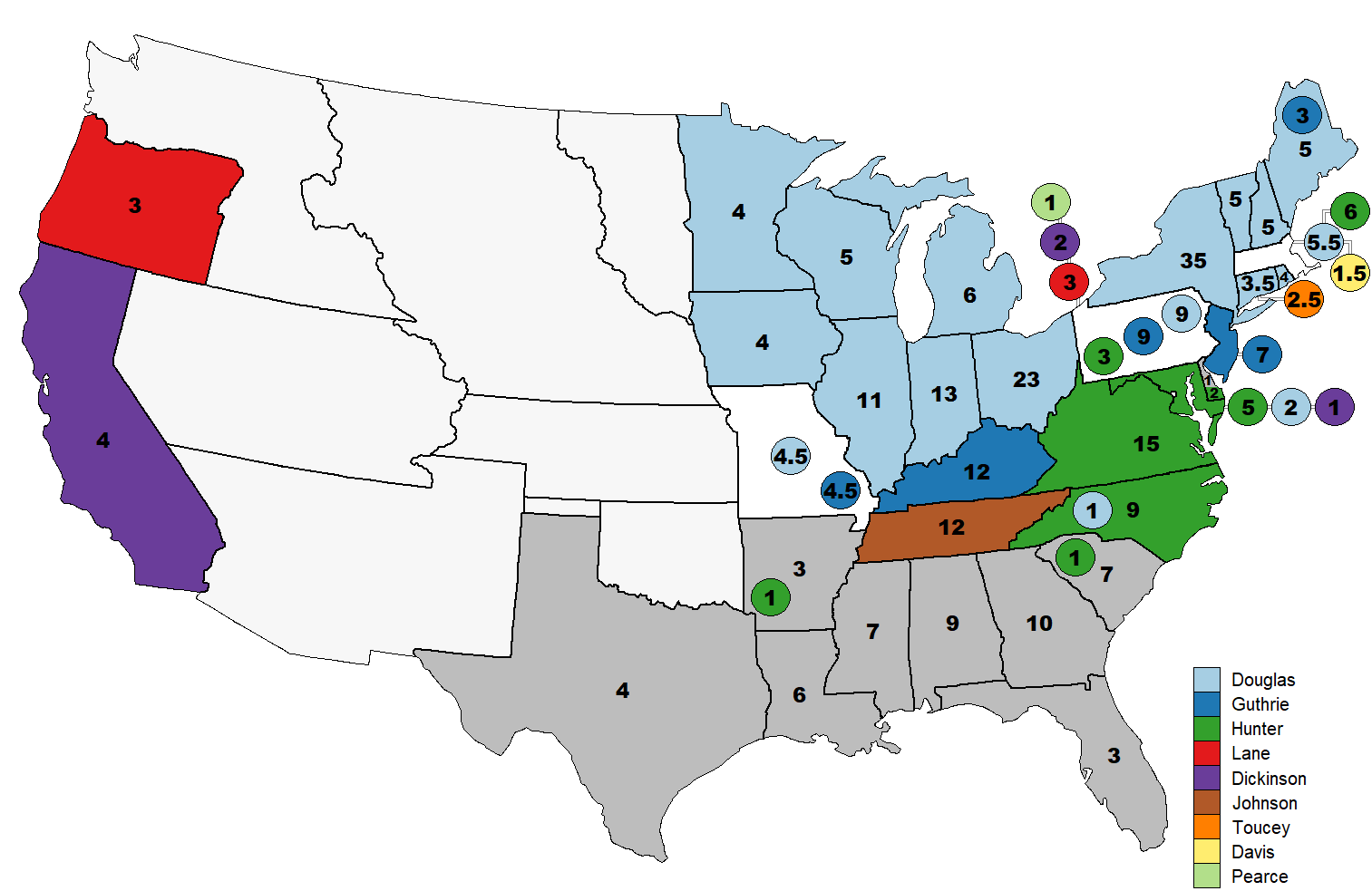
1st Ballot

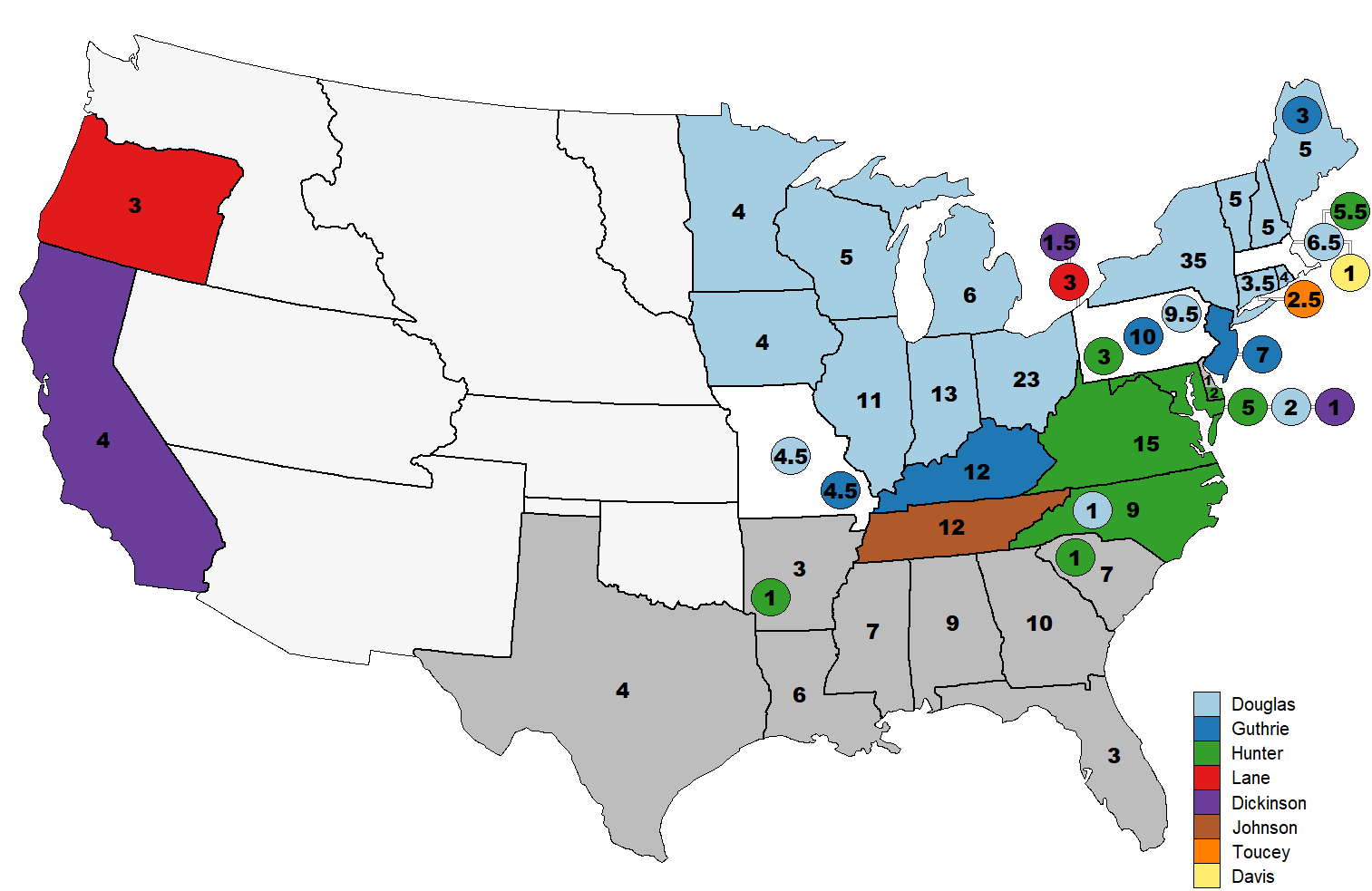
2nd Ballot

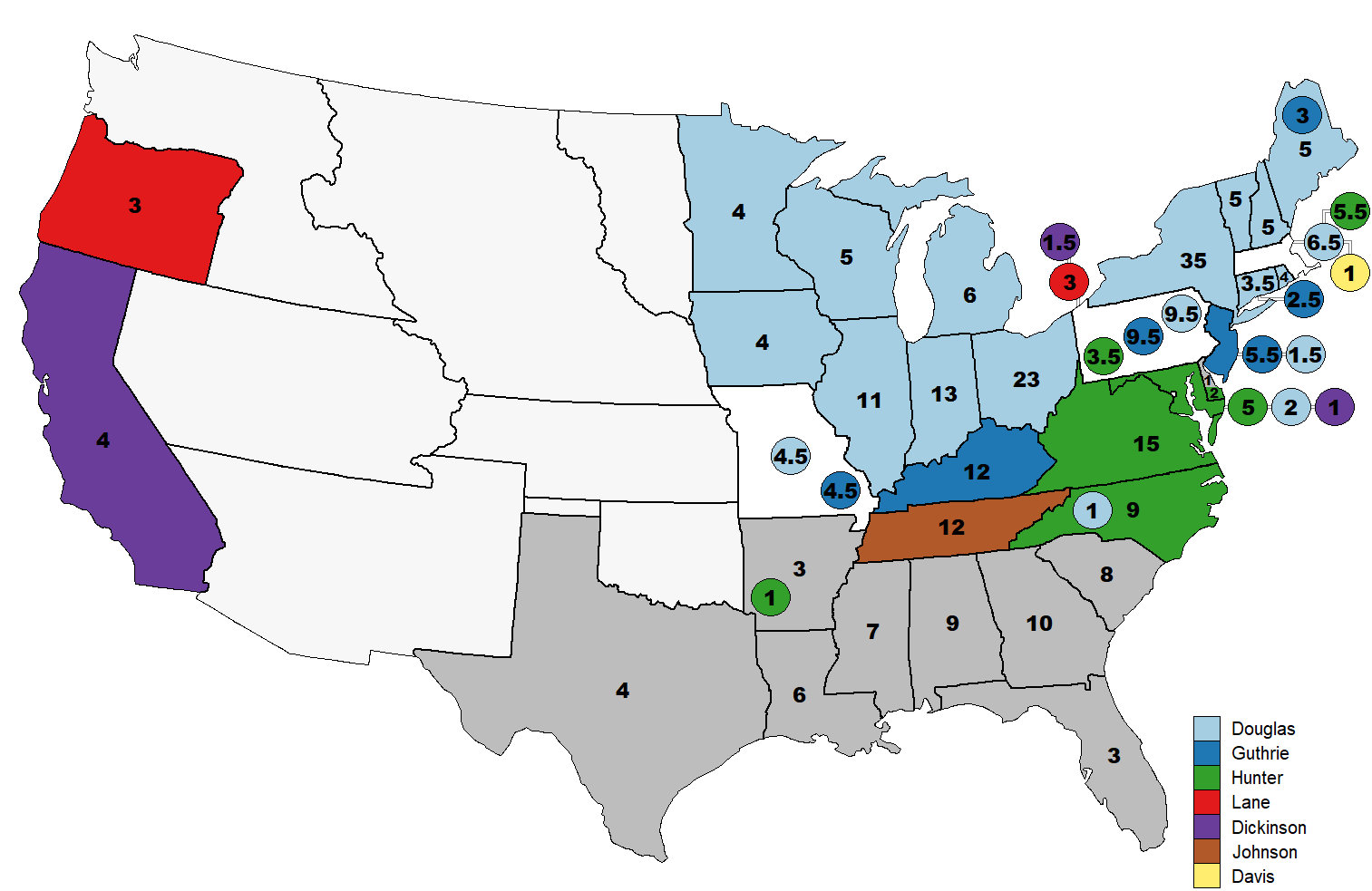
3rd Ballot

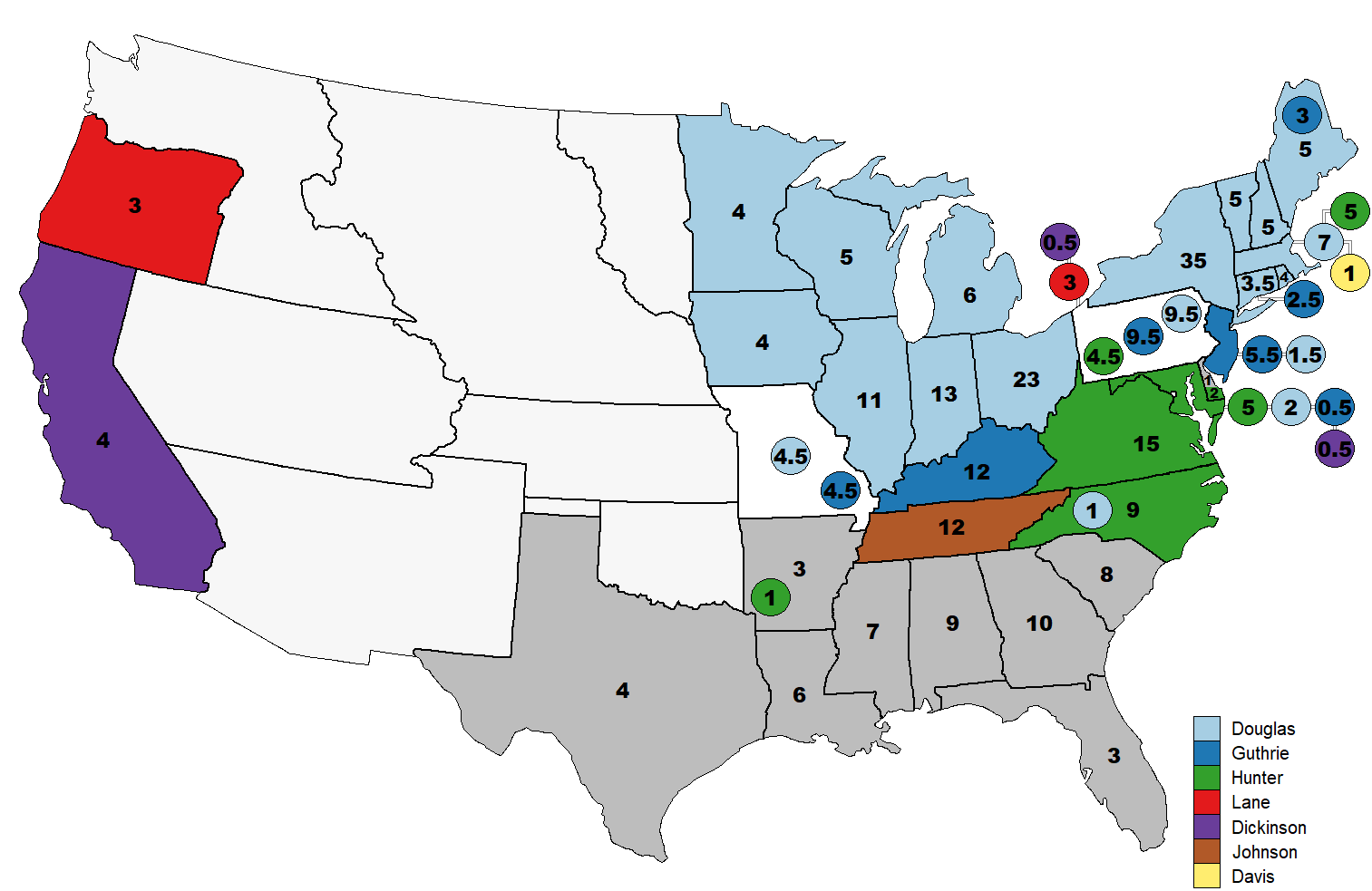
4th Ballot

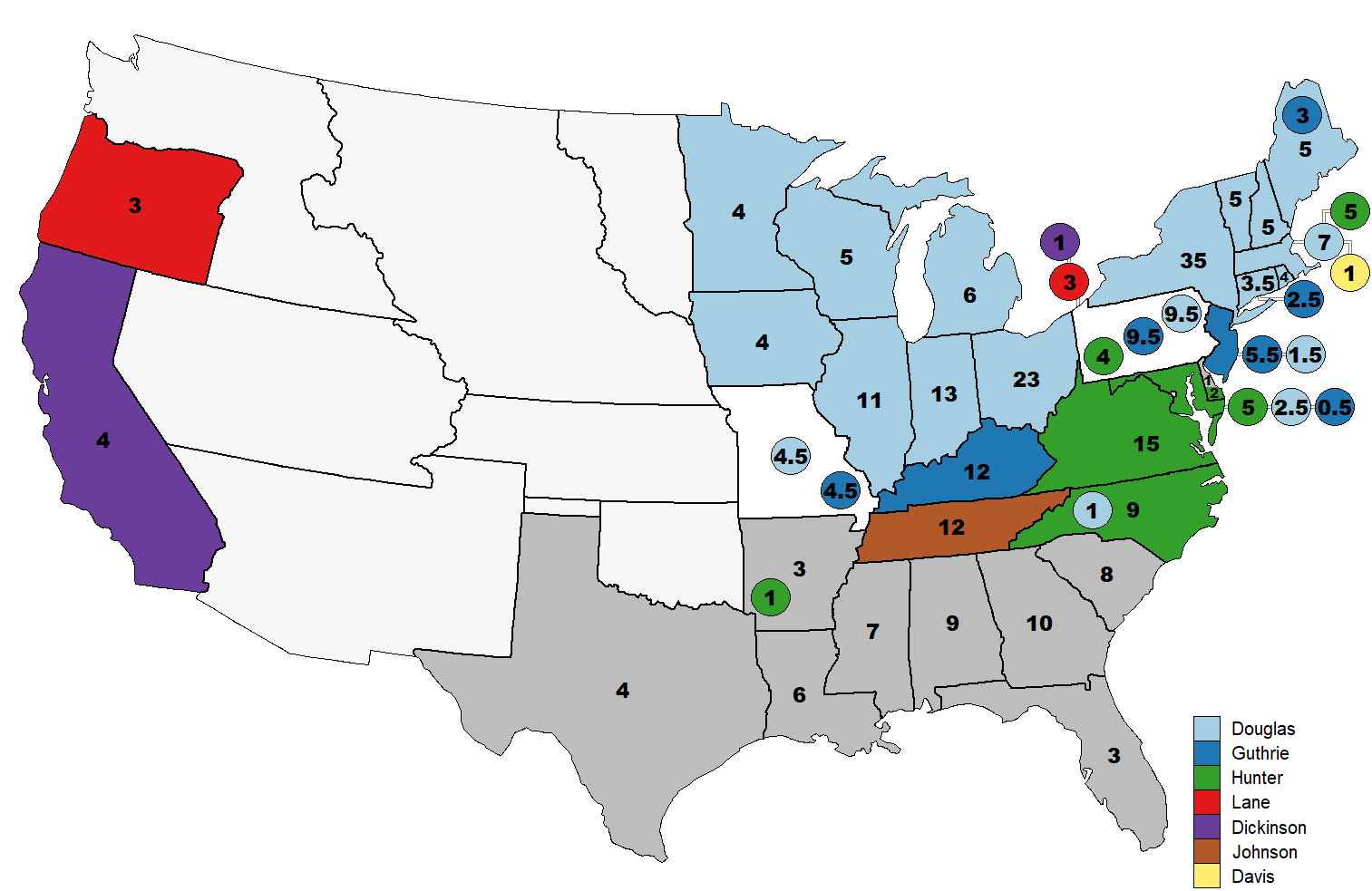
5th Ballot

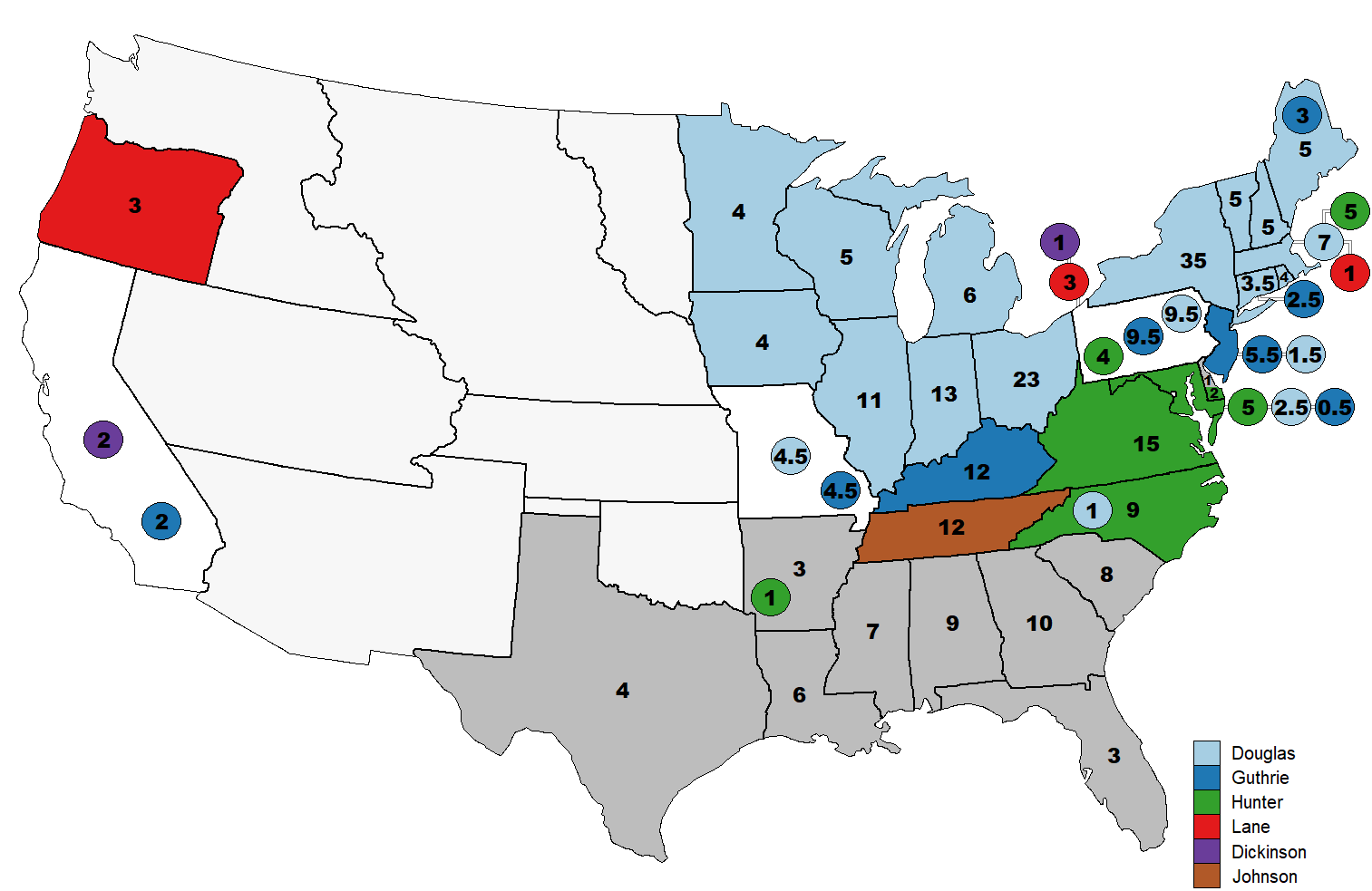
6th Ballot

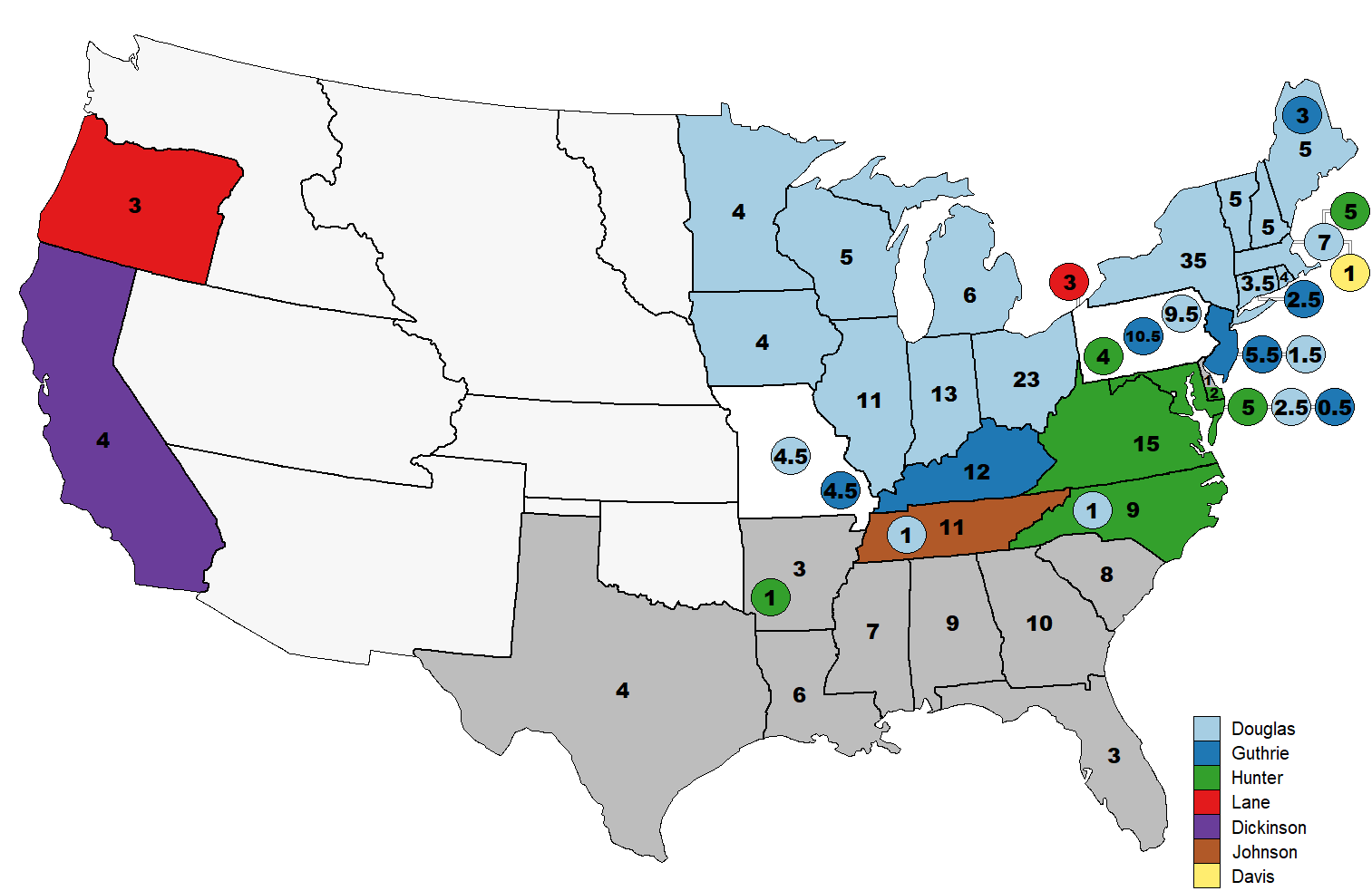
7th Ballot

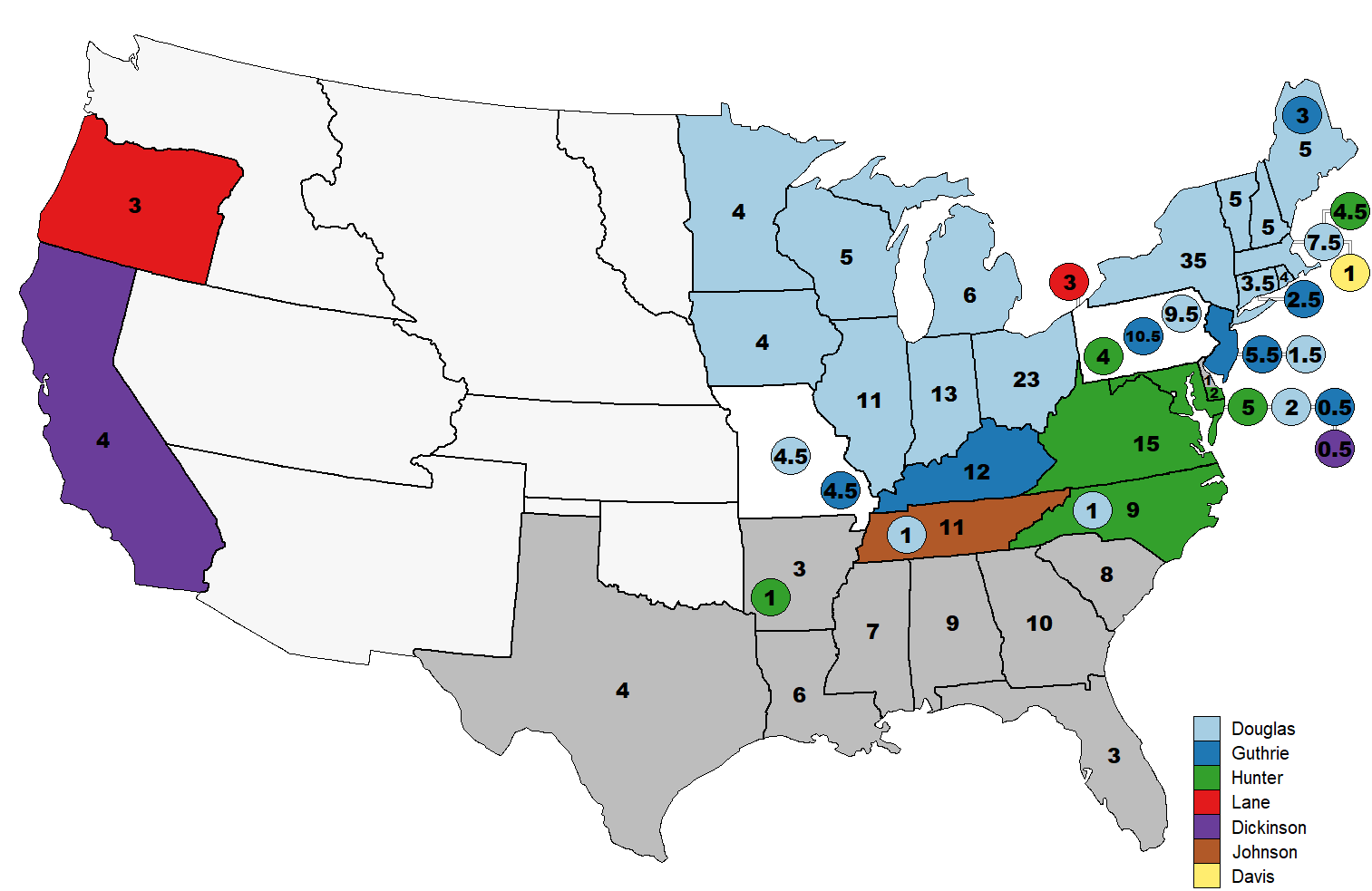
8th Ballot

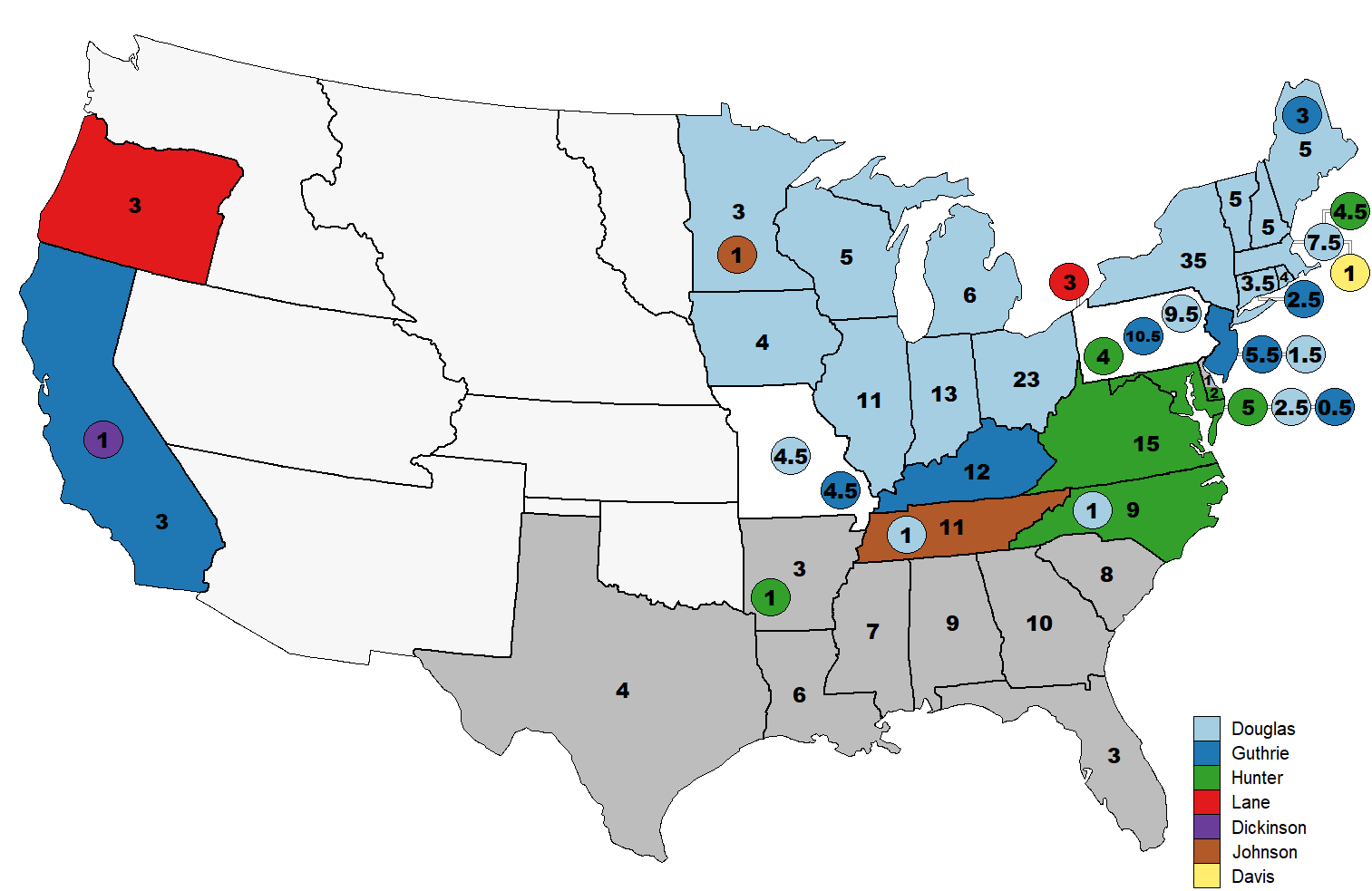
9th Ballot

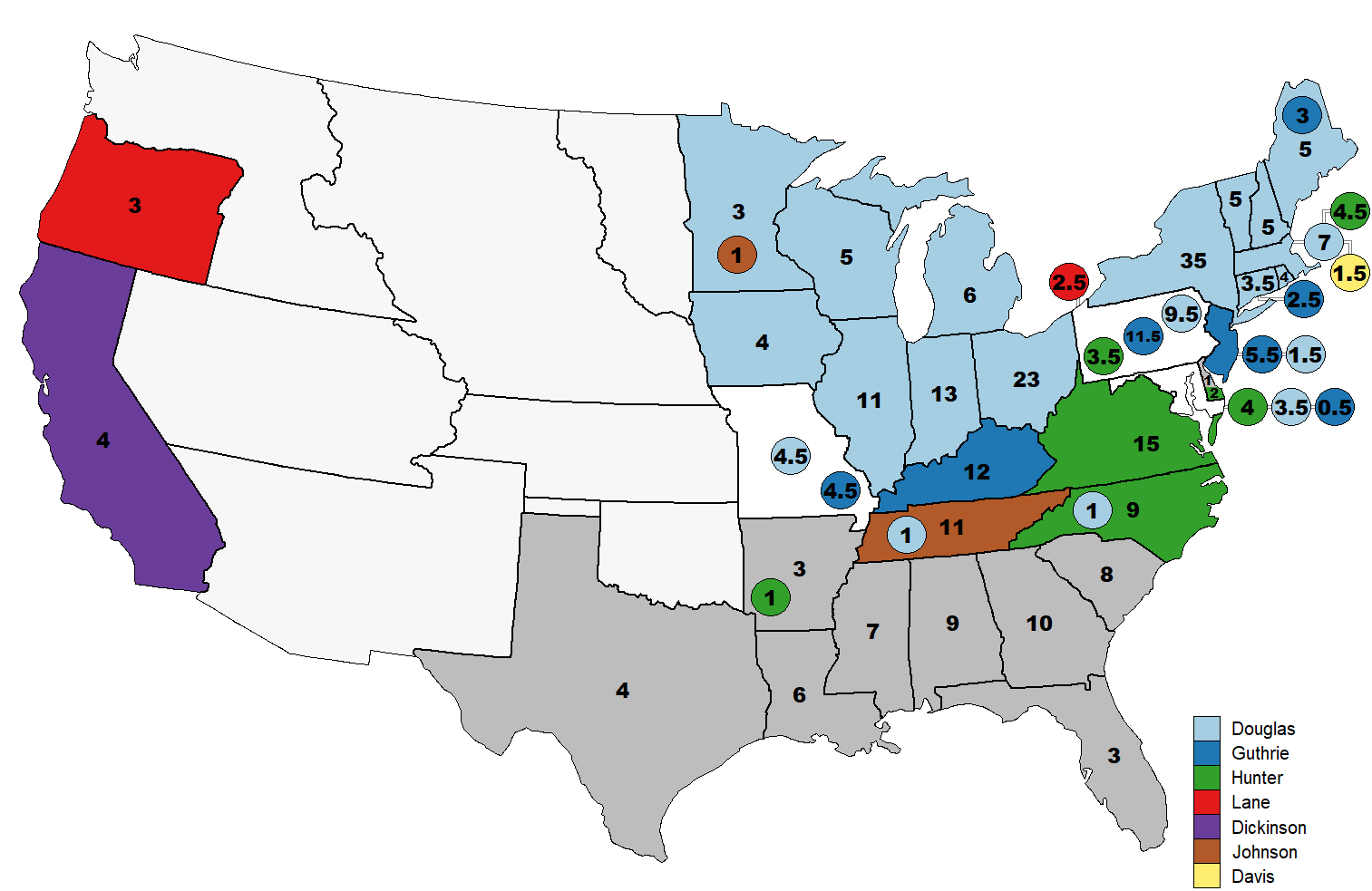
10th Ballot

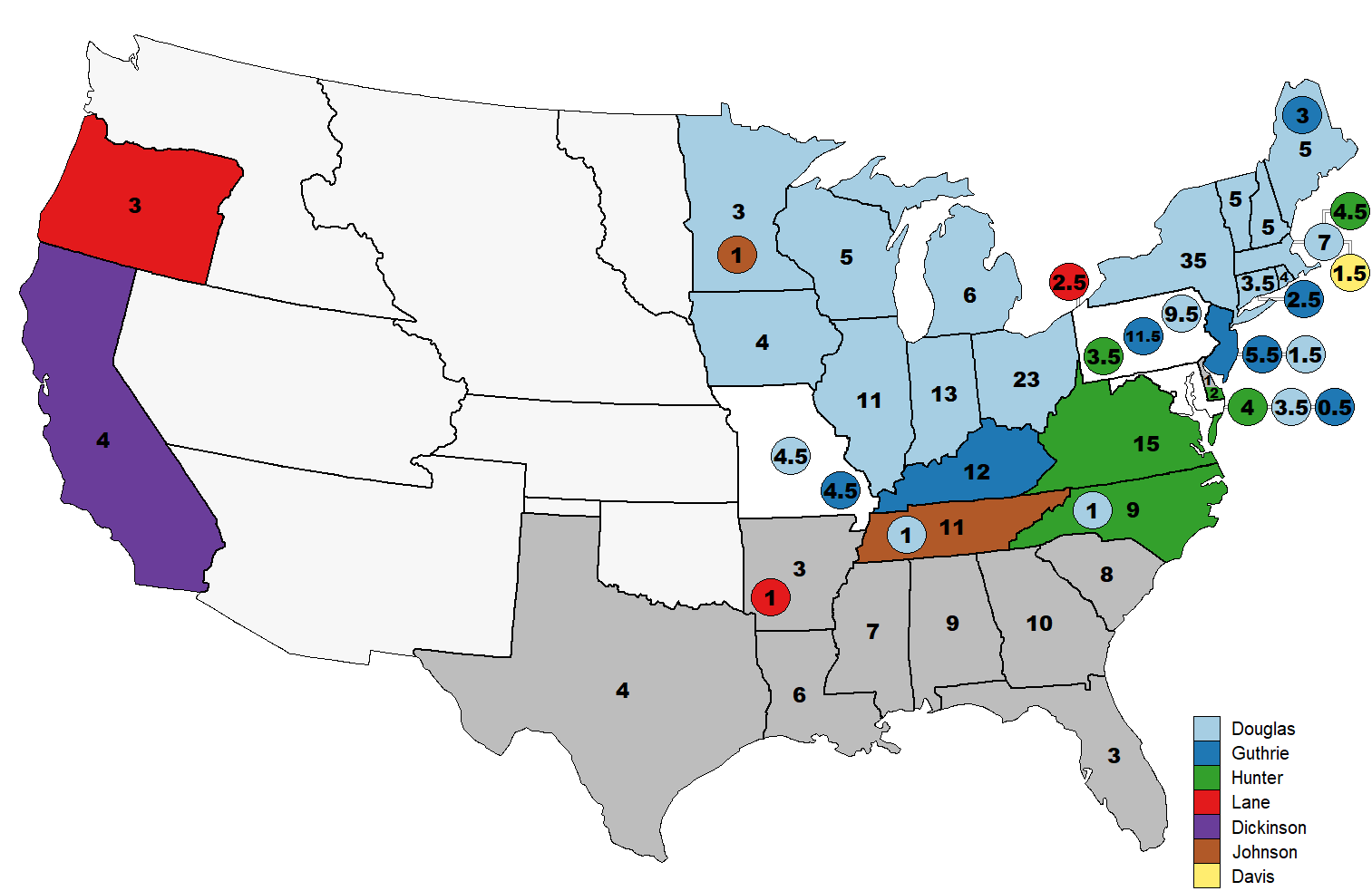
11th Ballot

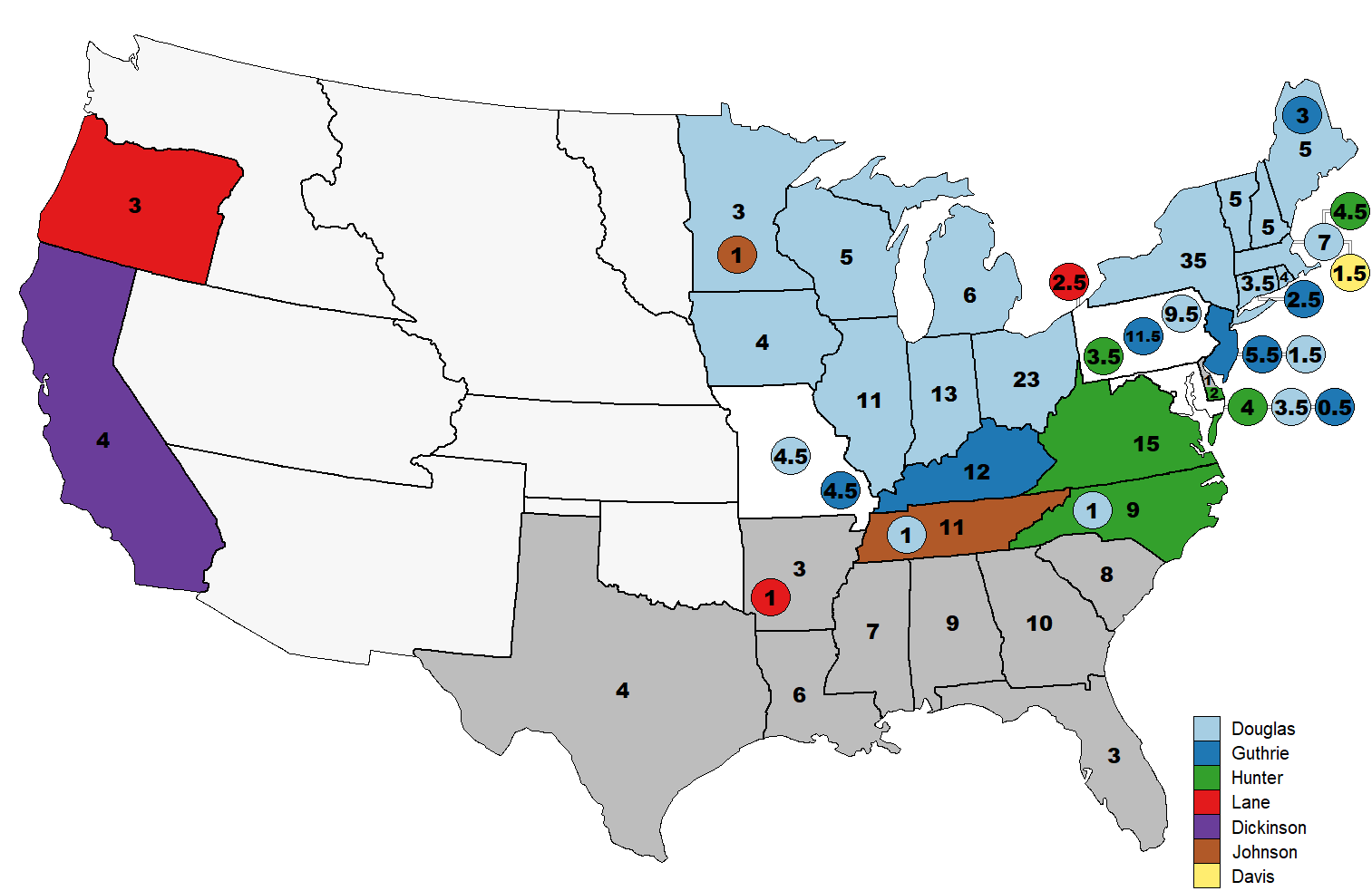
12th Ballot

2nd Day of Presidential Balloting / 9th Day of Convention (Wednesday, May 2, 1860)

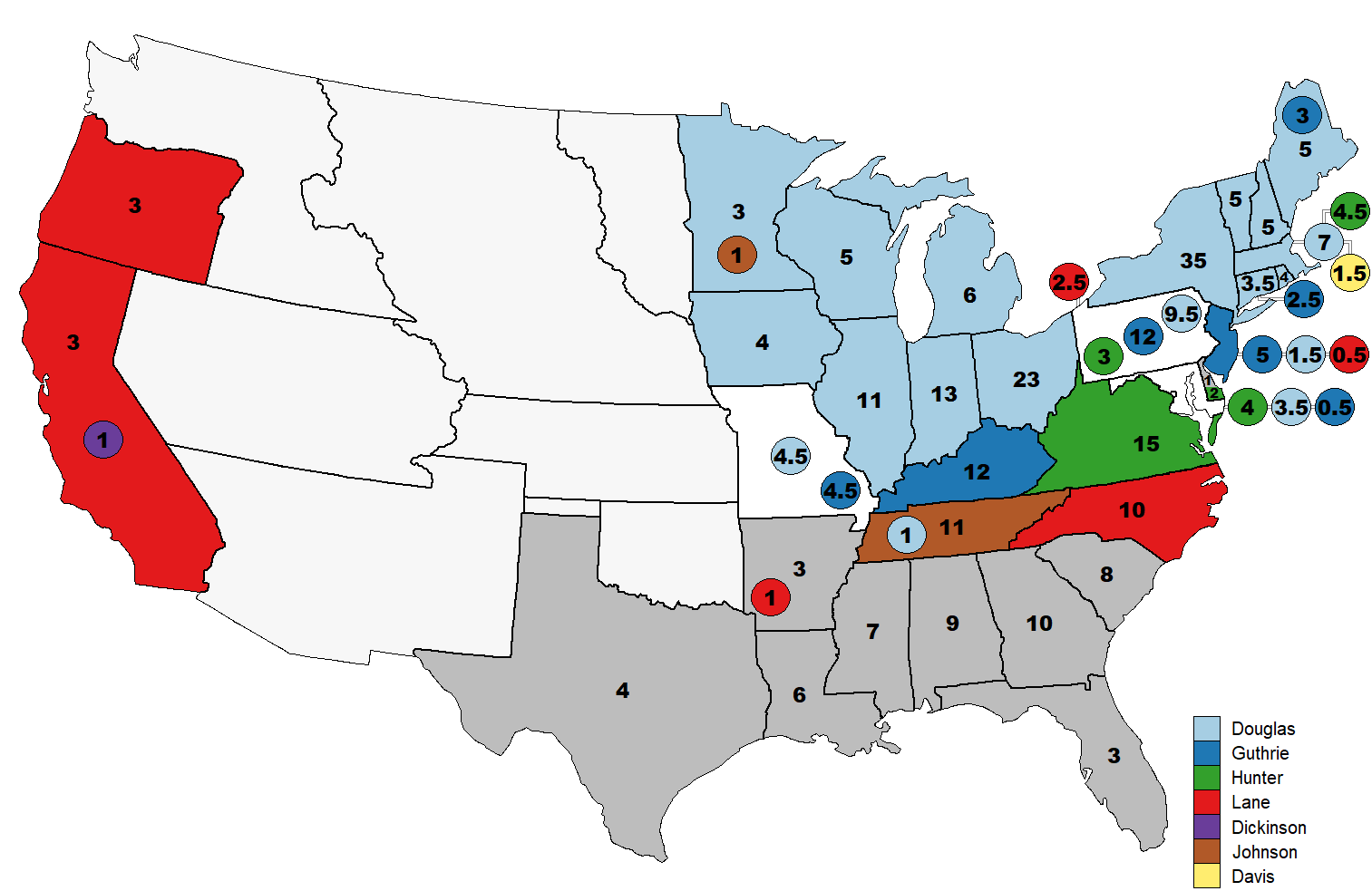
13th Ballot

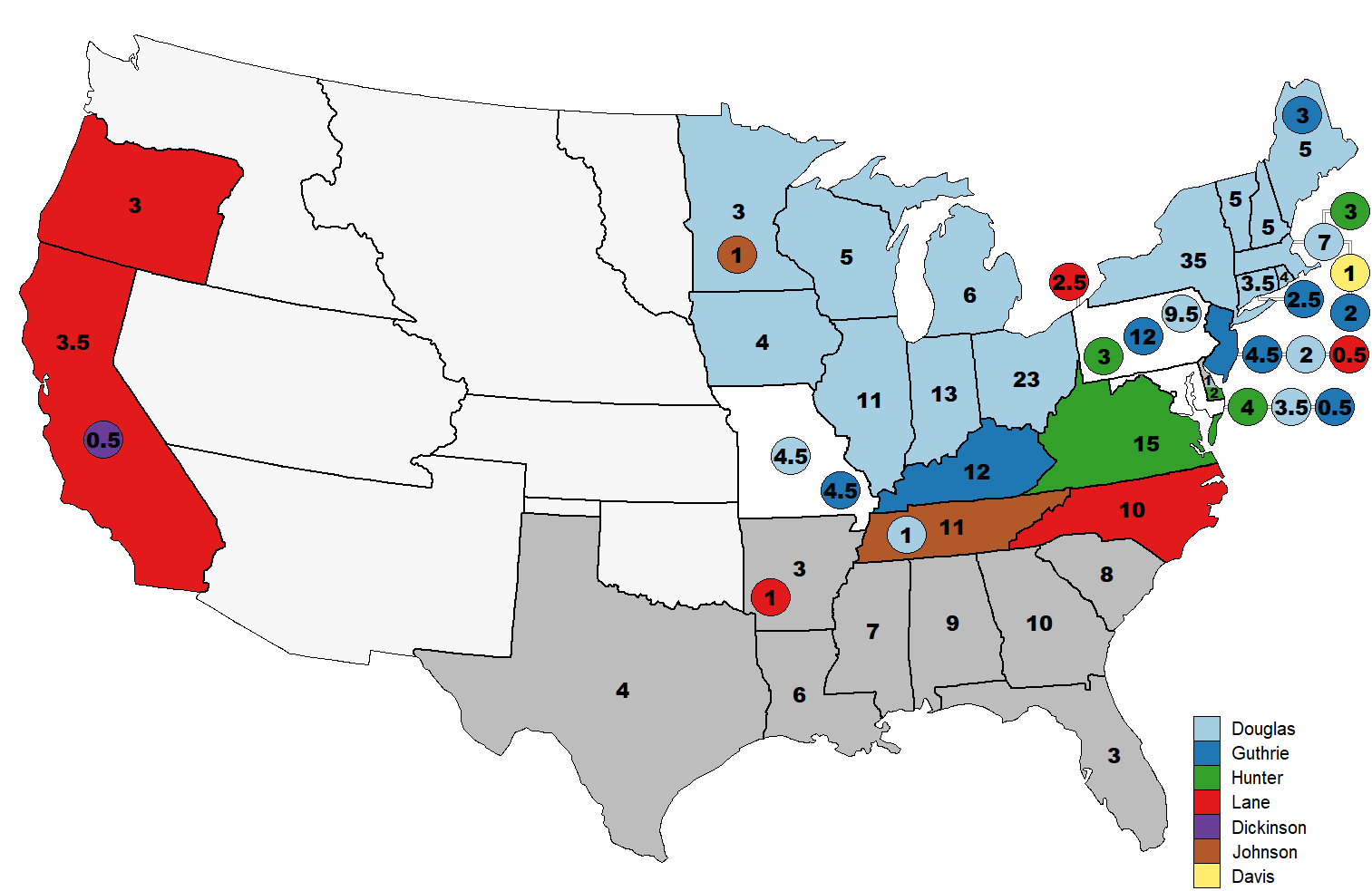
14th Ballot

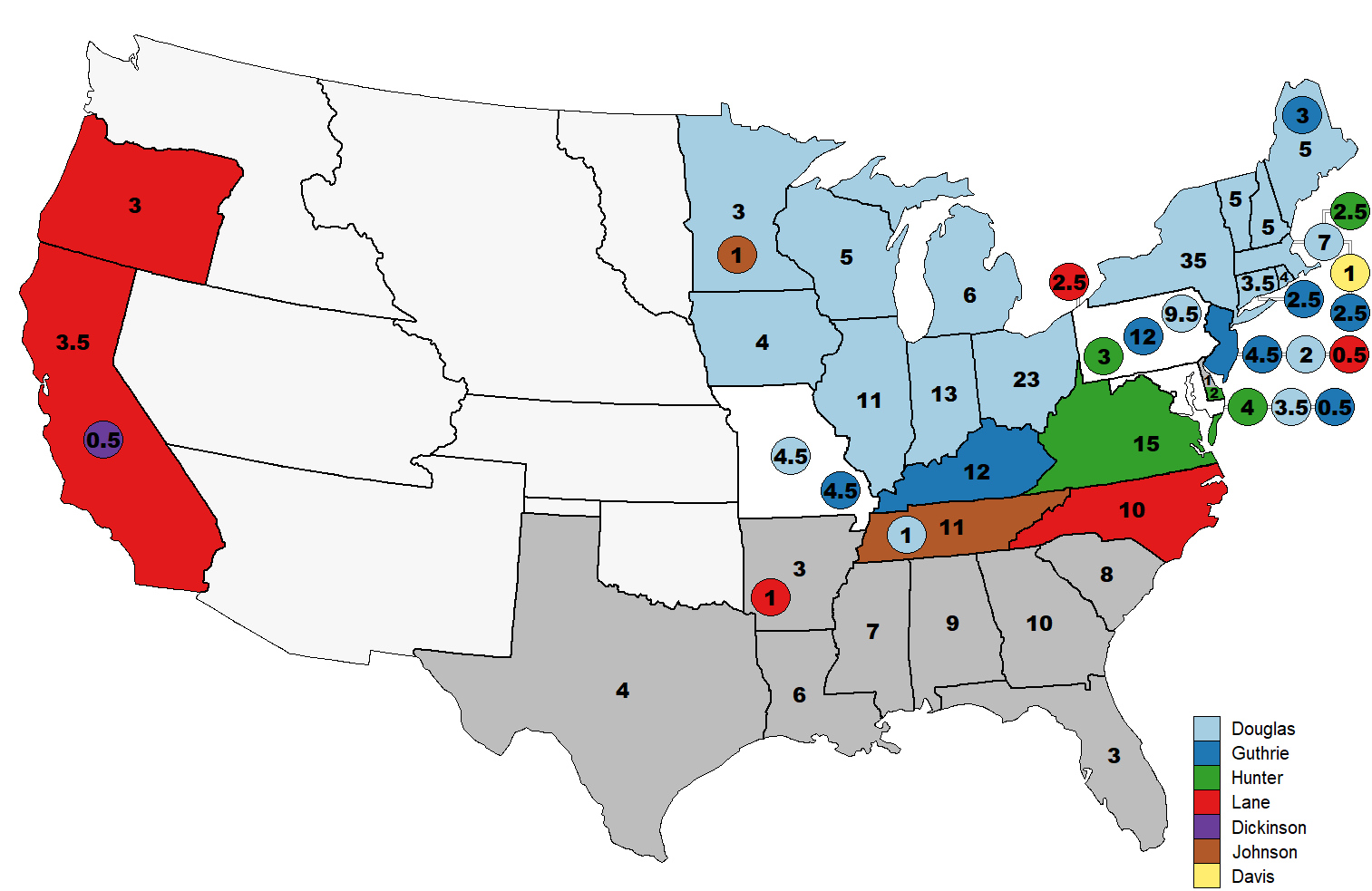
15th Ballot

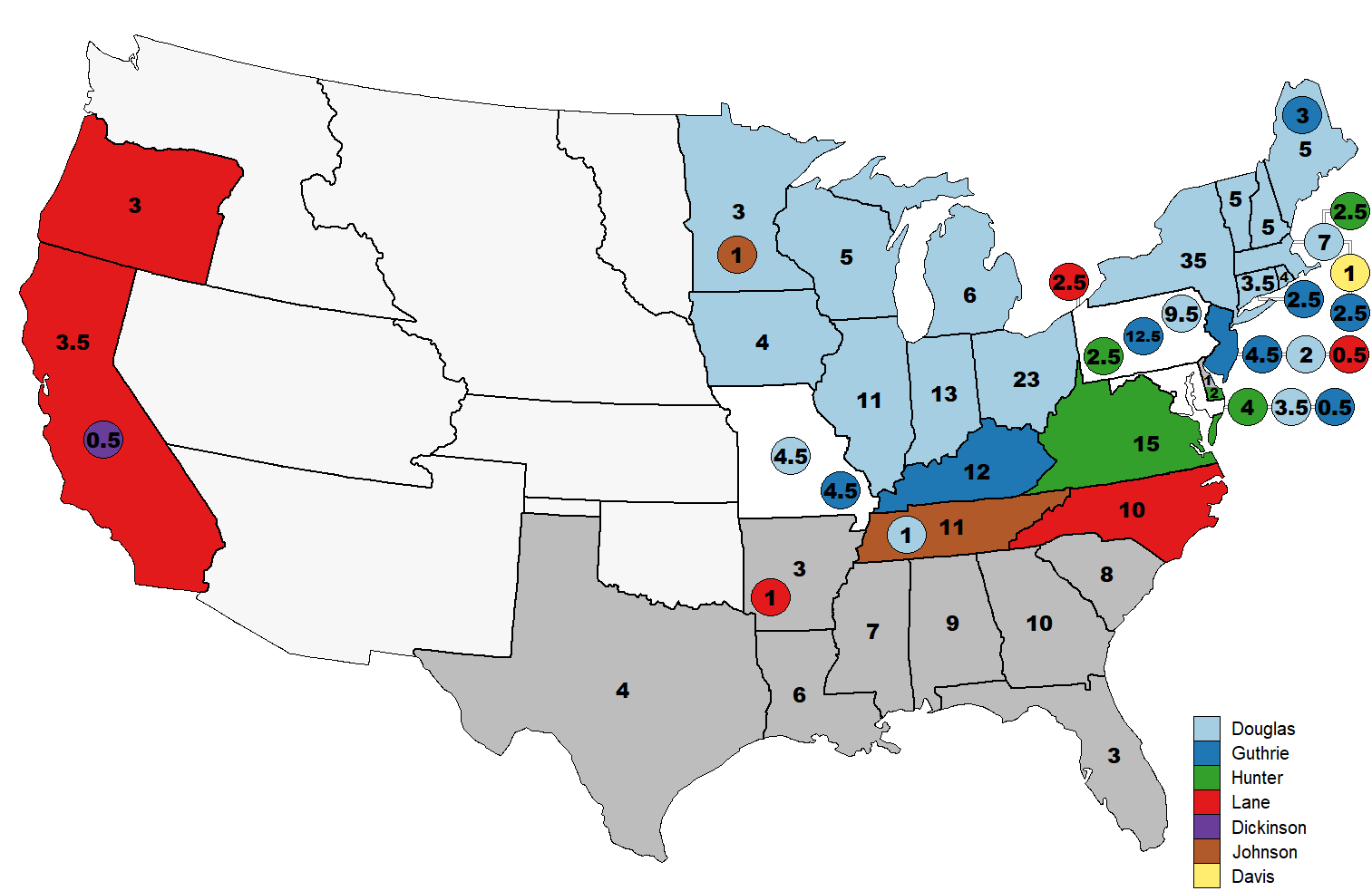
16th Ballot

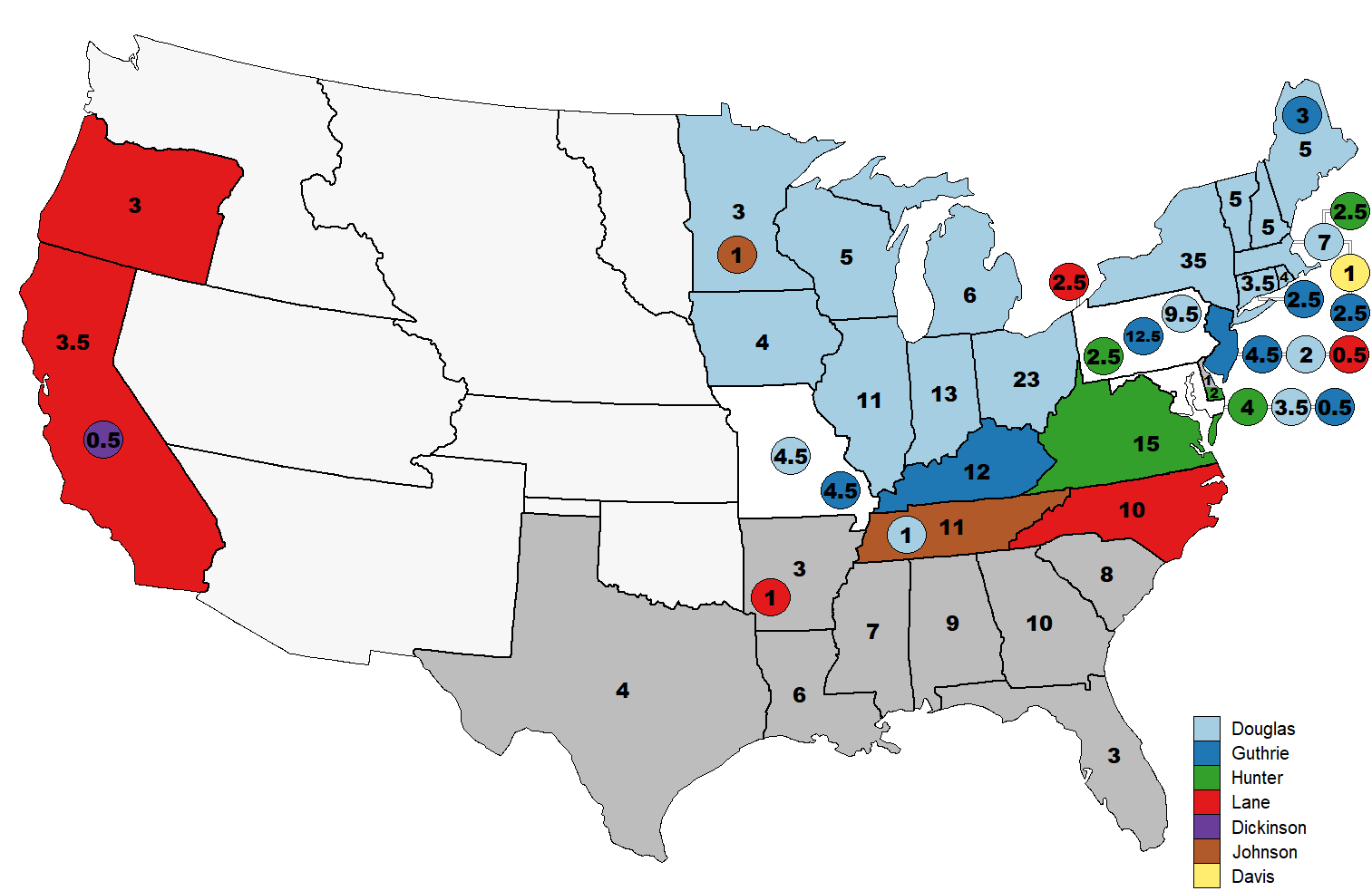
17th Ballot

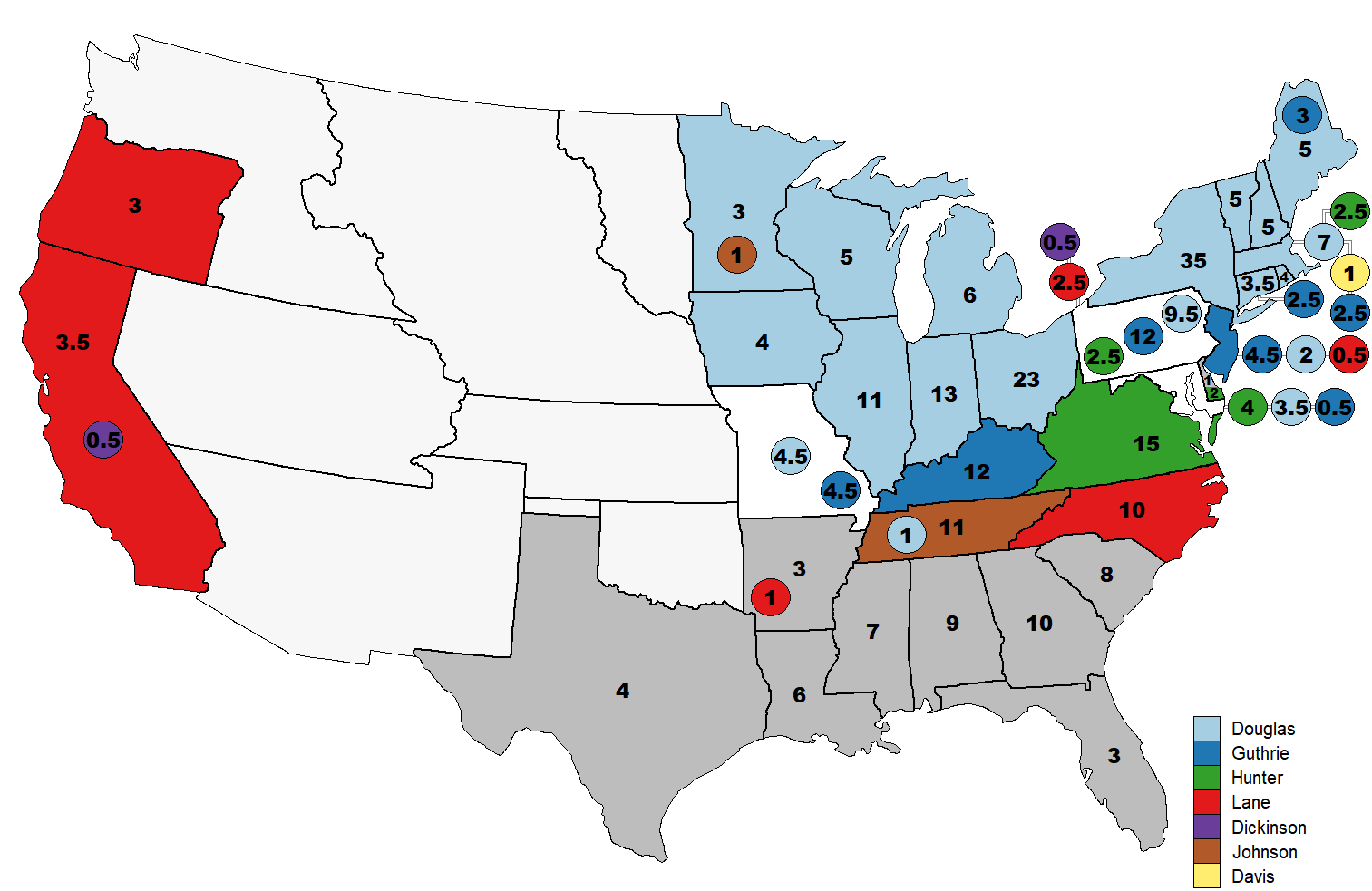
18th Ballot

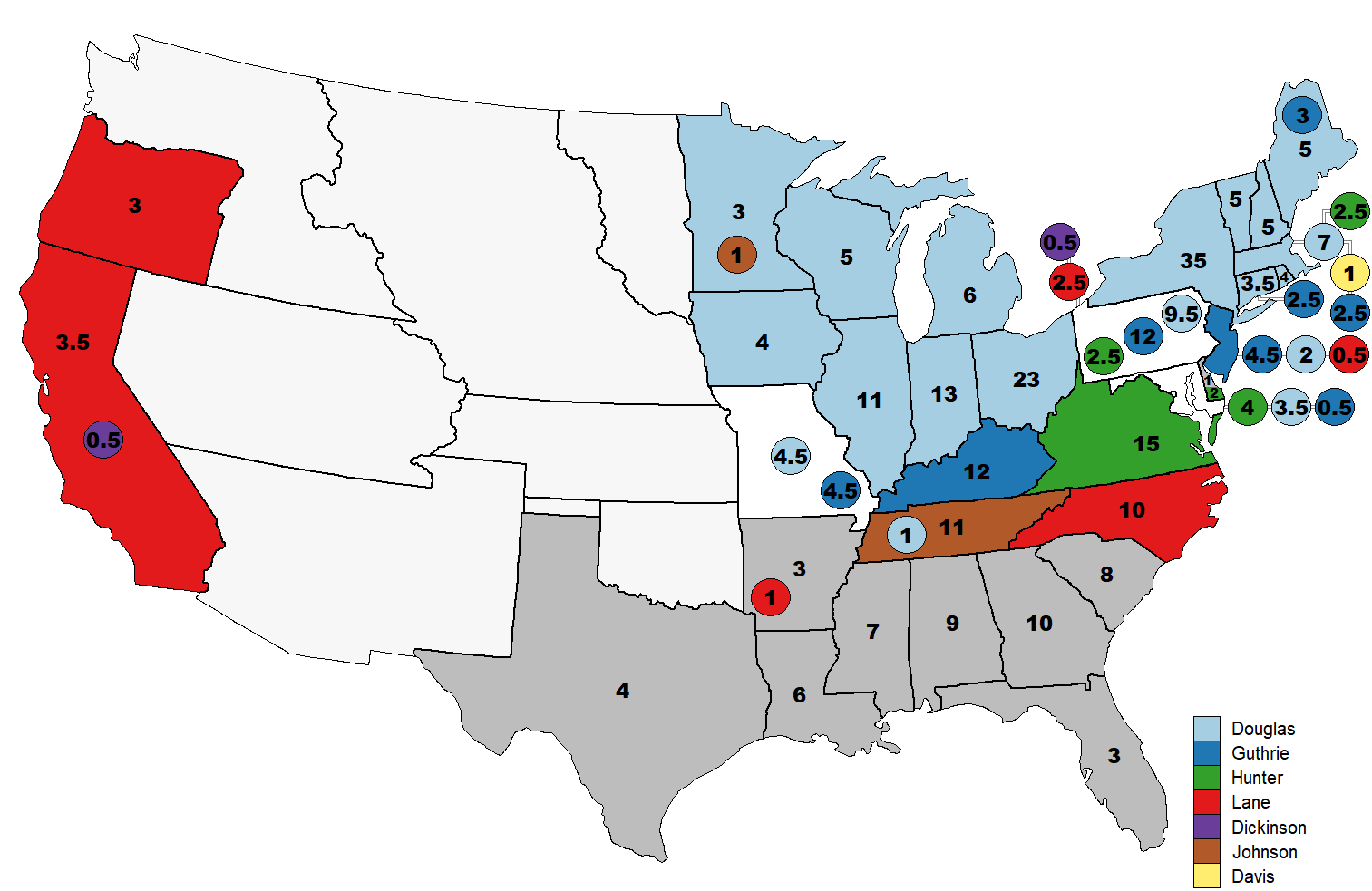
19th Ballot

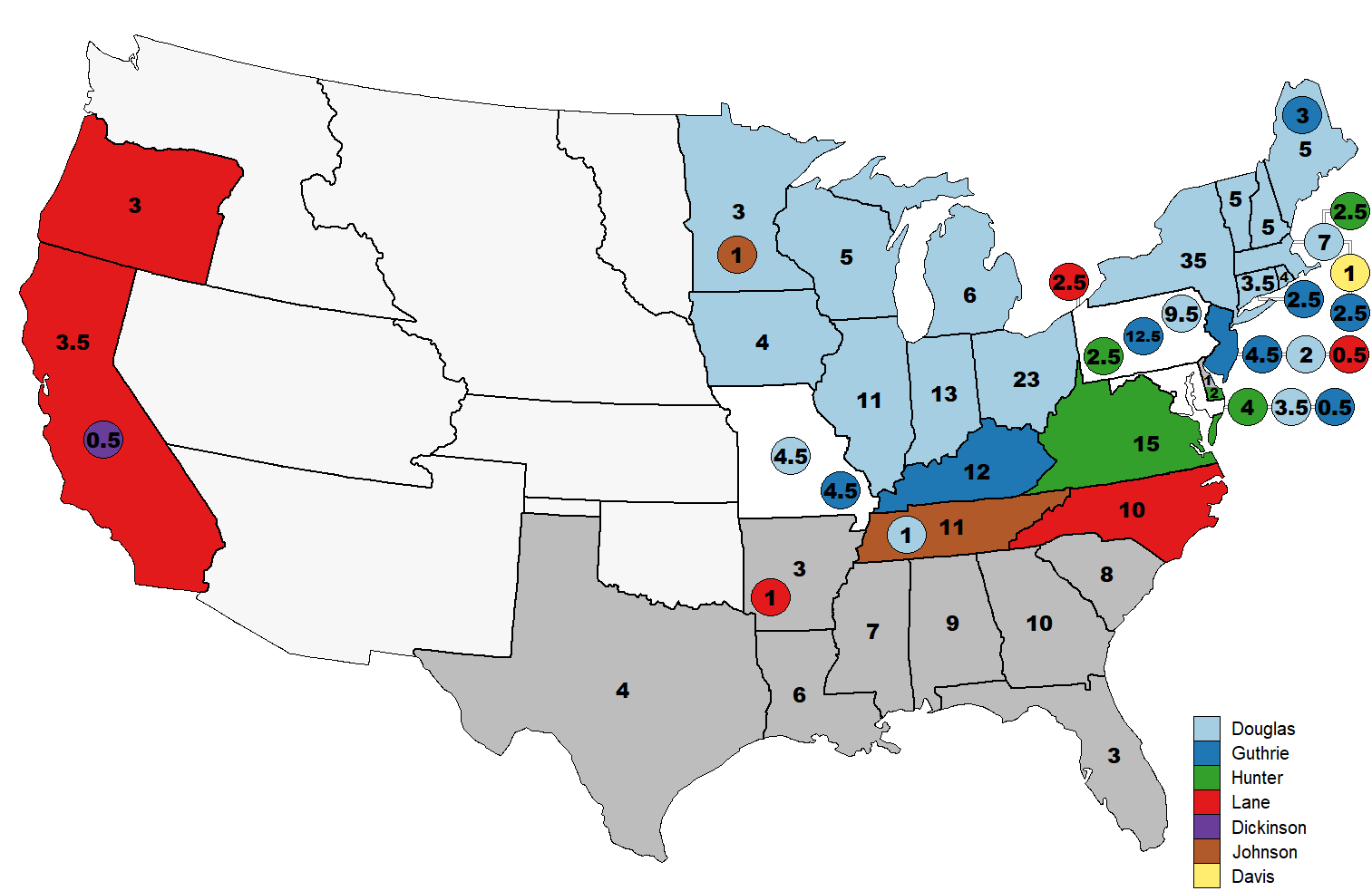
20th Ballot

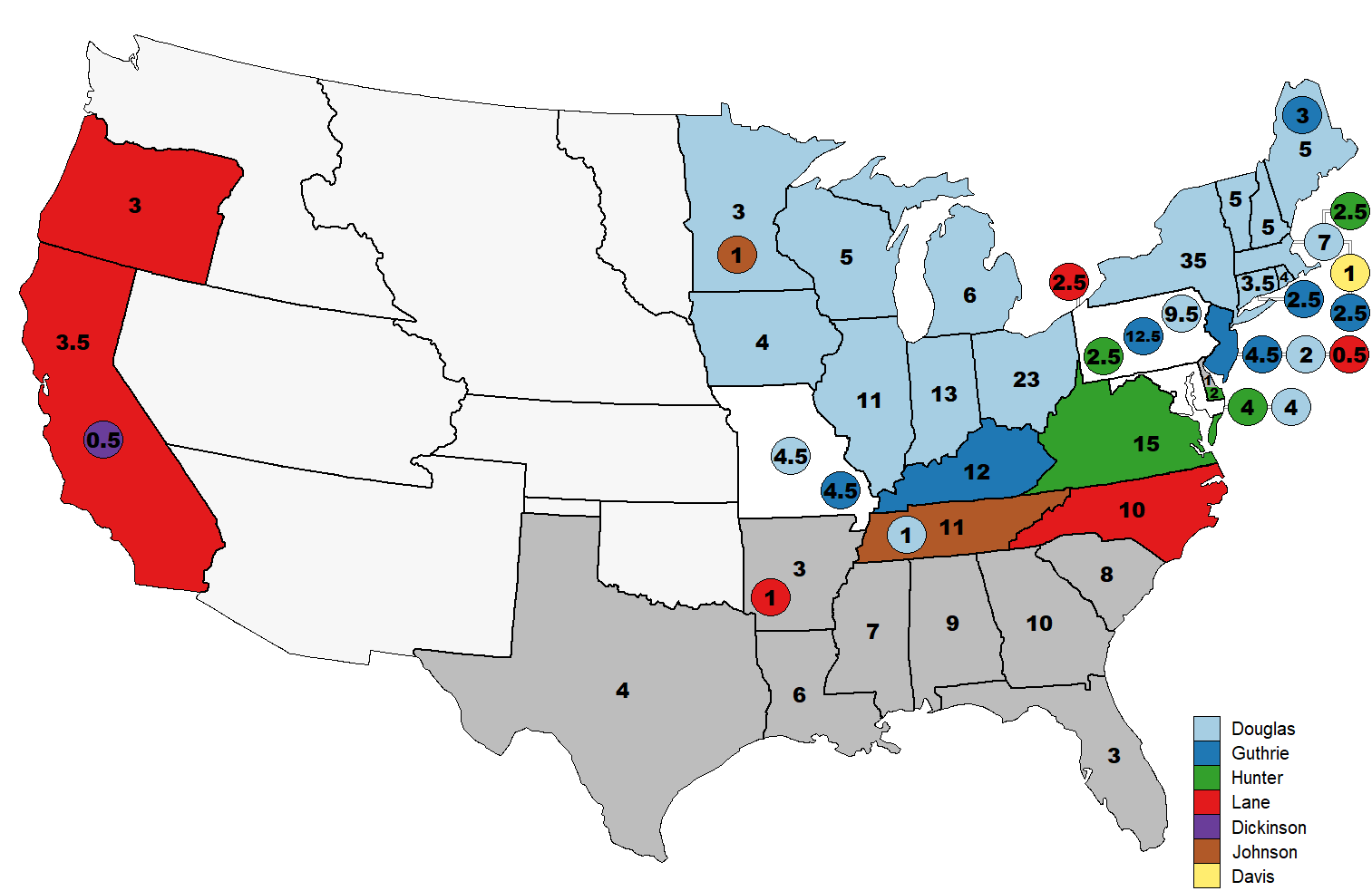
21st Ballot

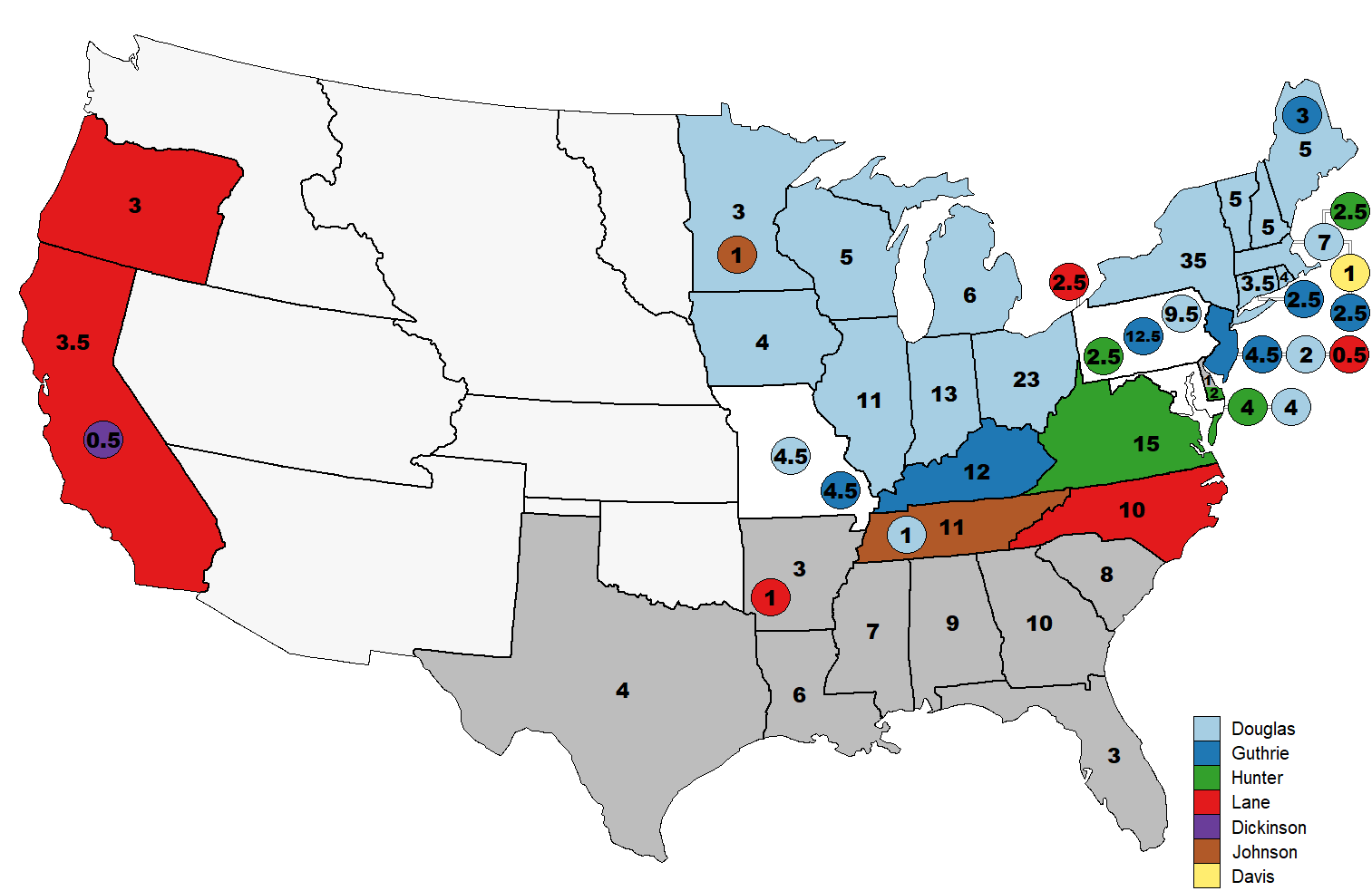
22nd Ballot

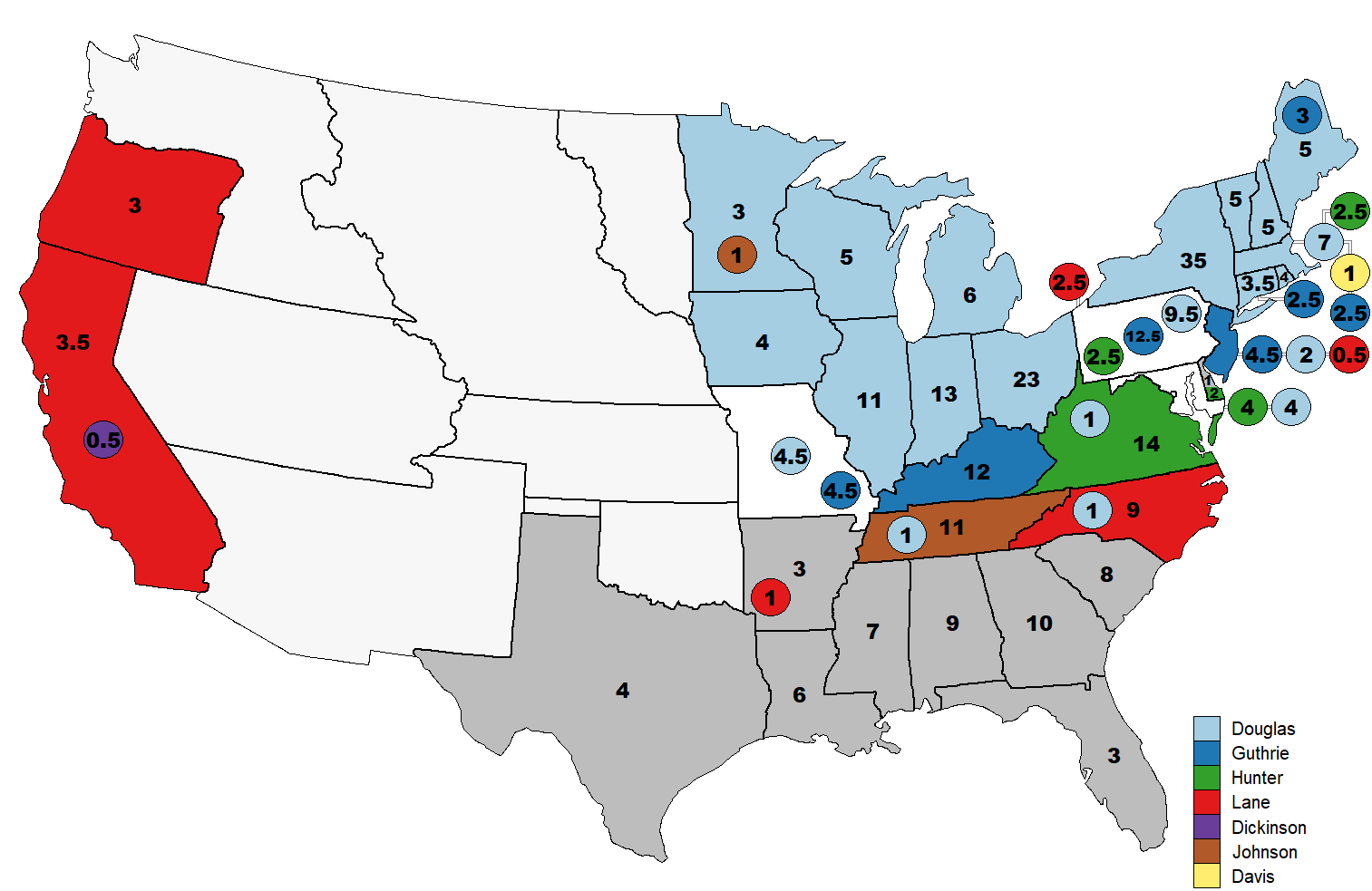
23rd Ballot

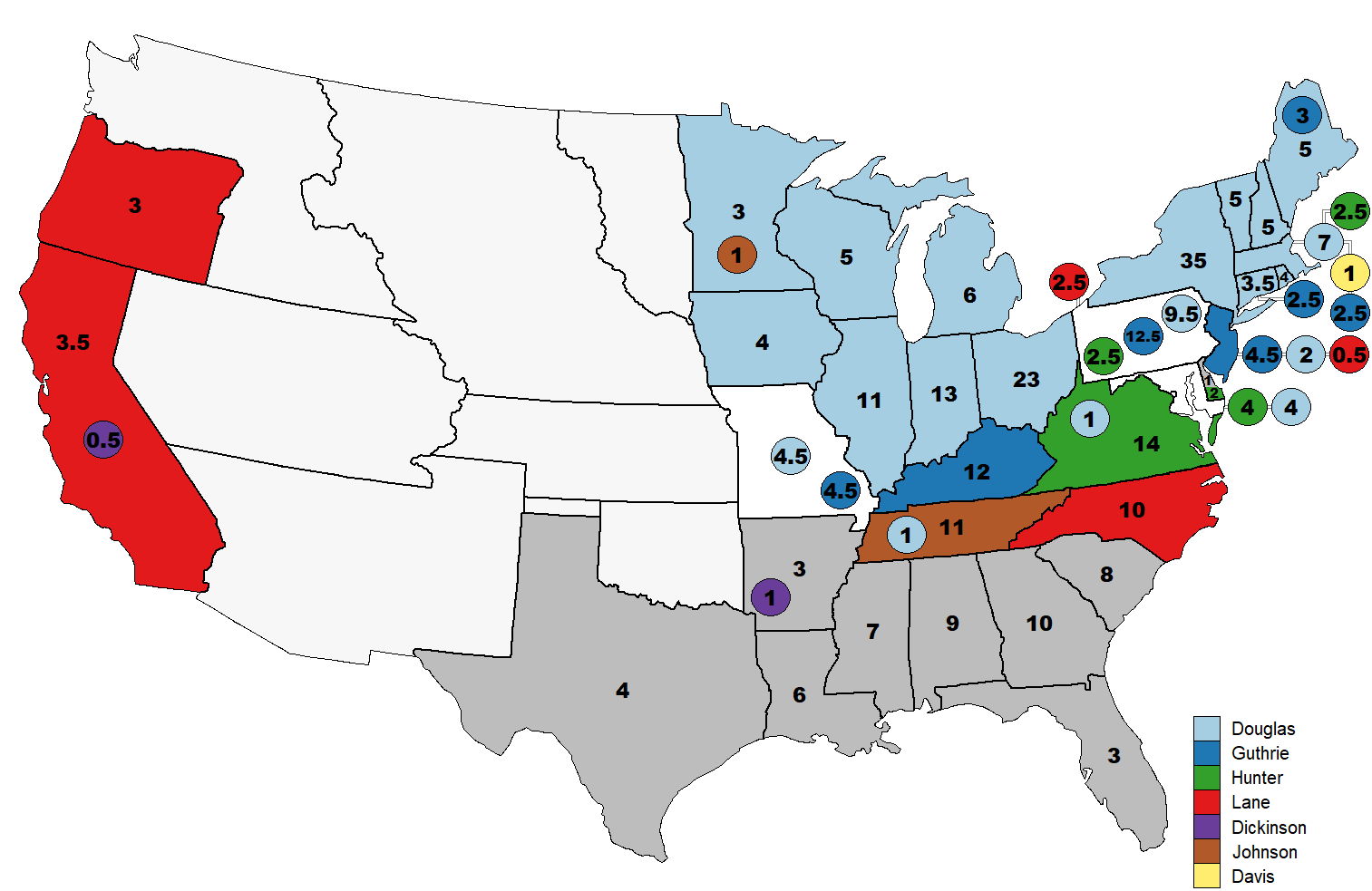
24th Ballot

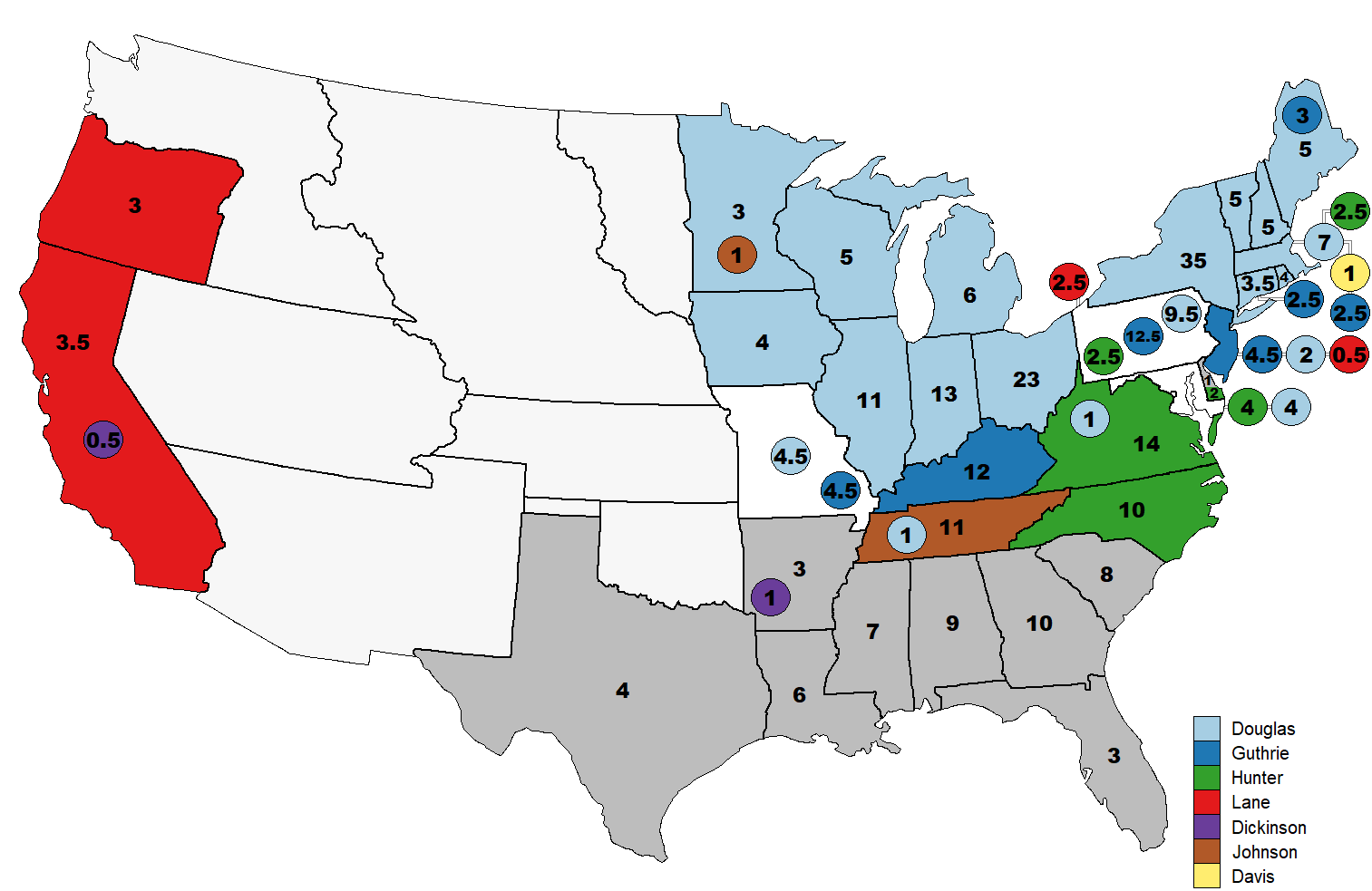
25th Ballot

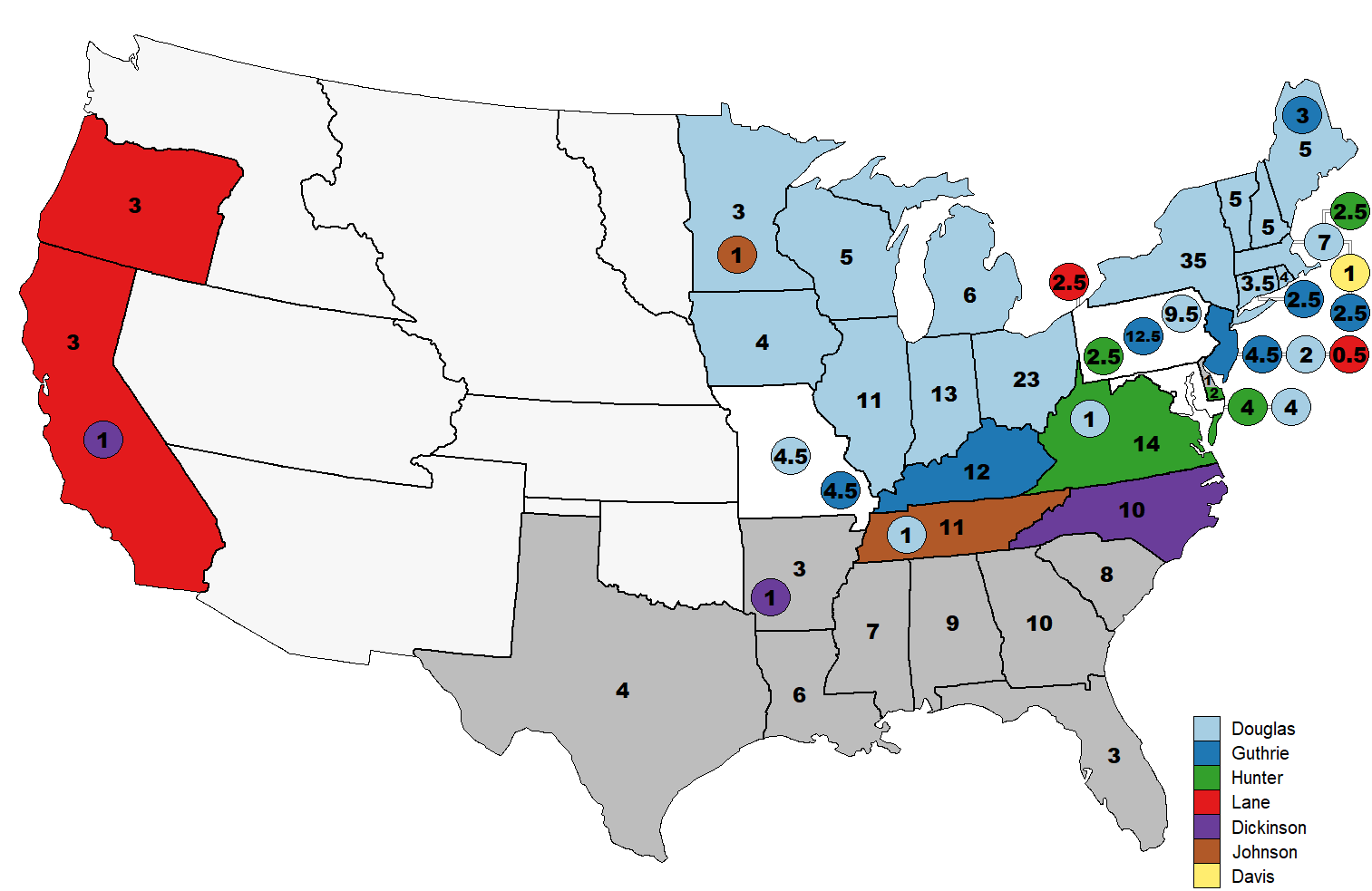
26th Ballot

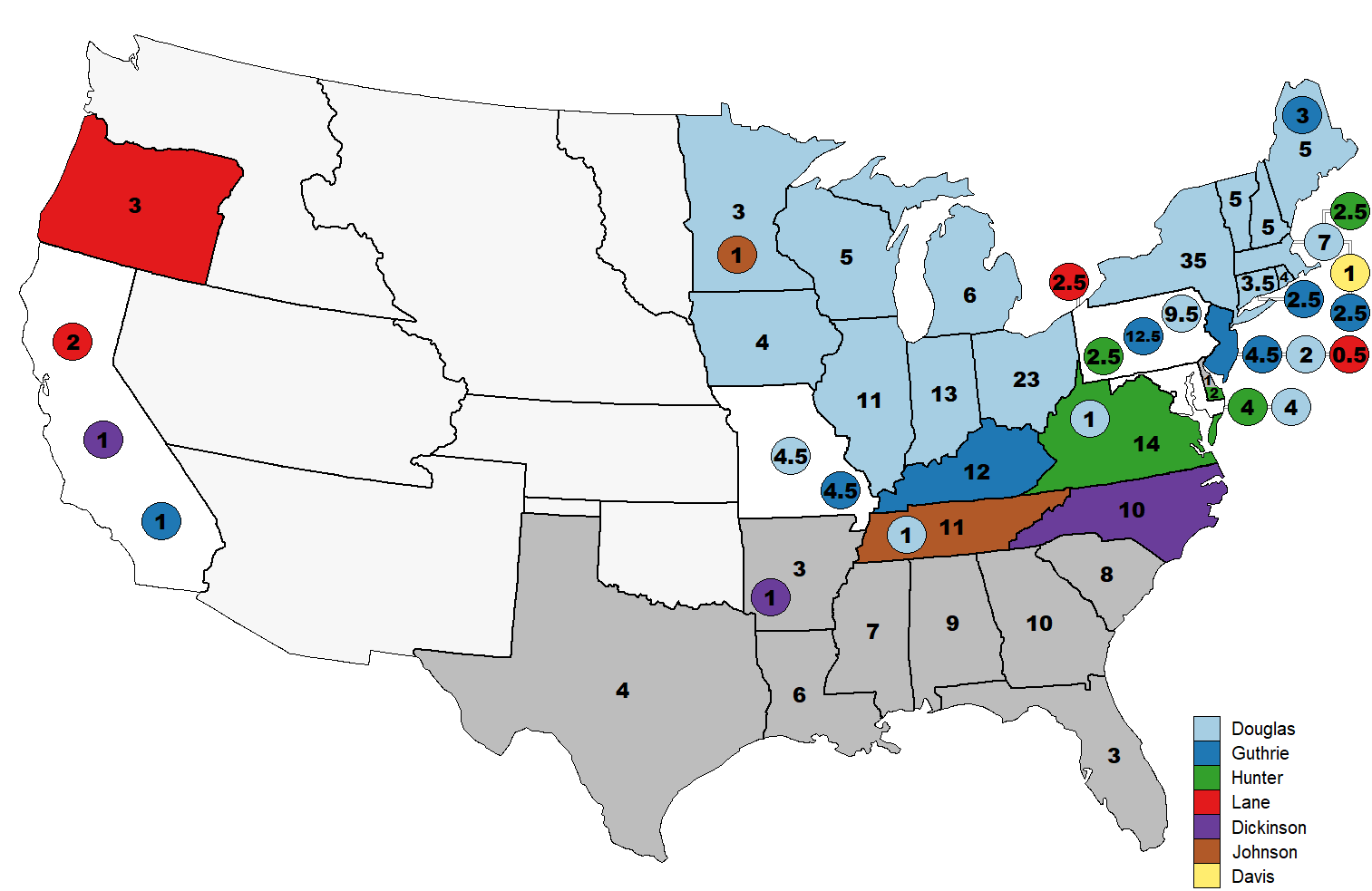
27th Ballot

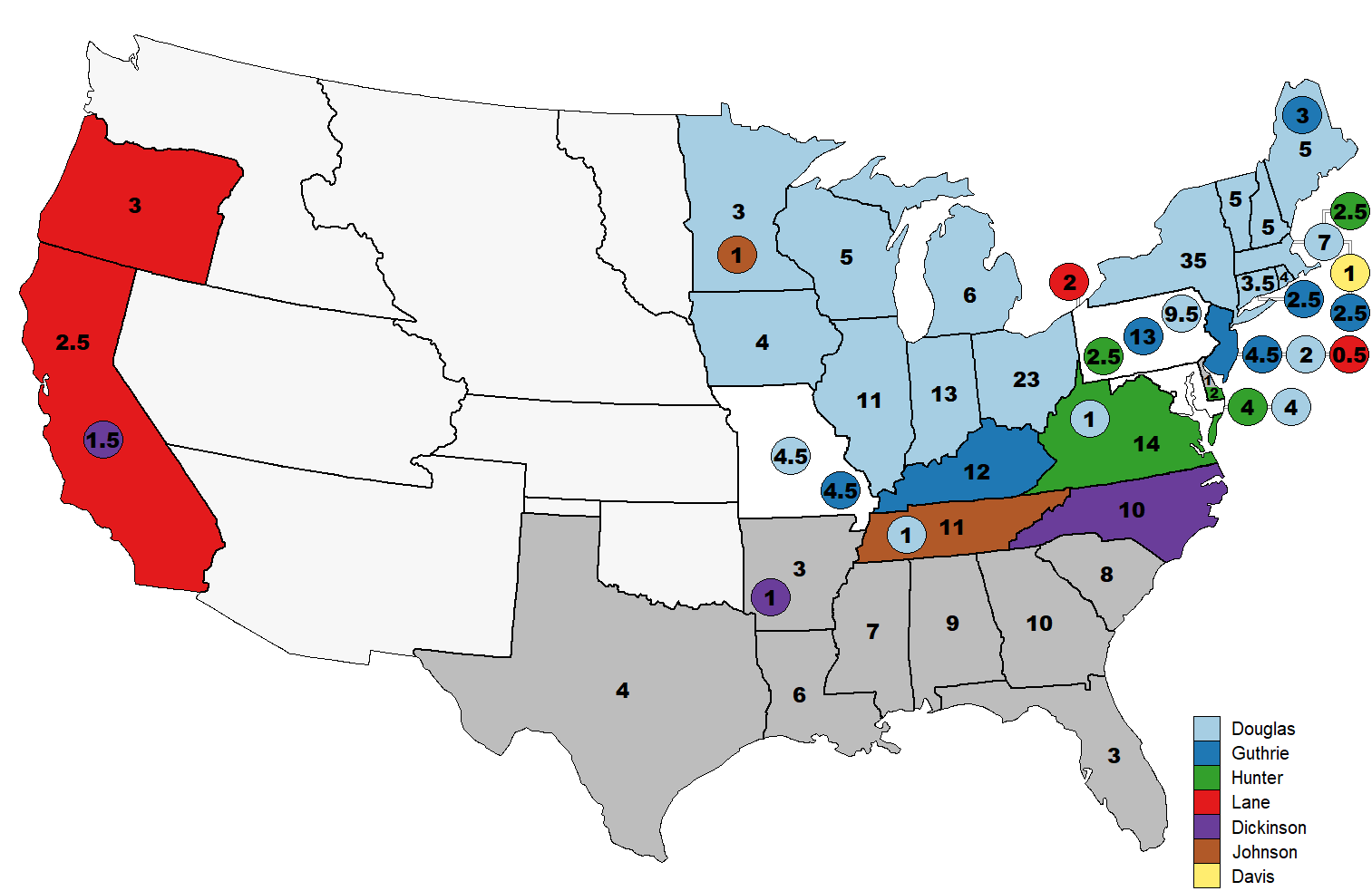
28th Ballot

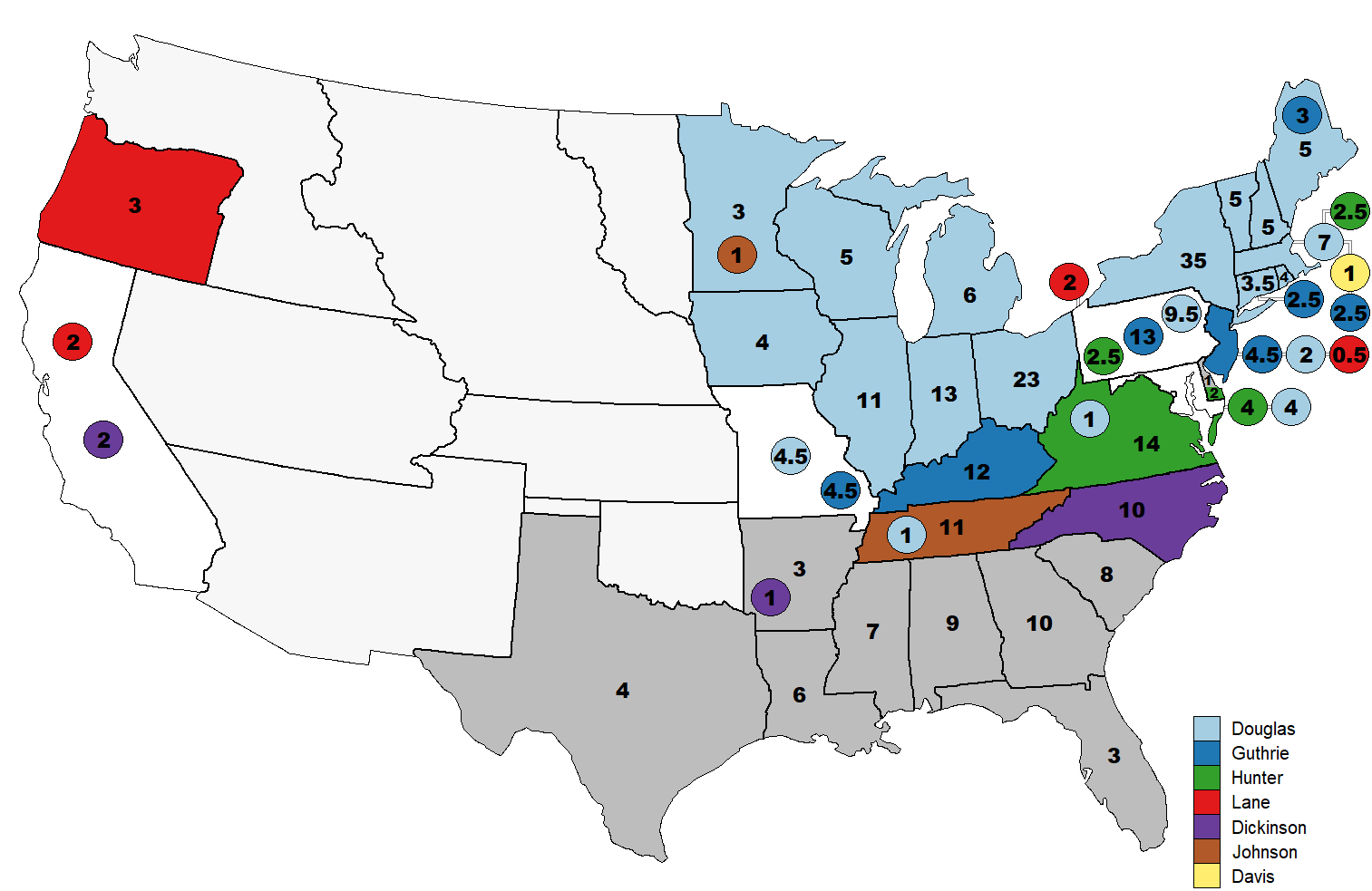
29th Ballot

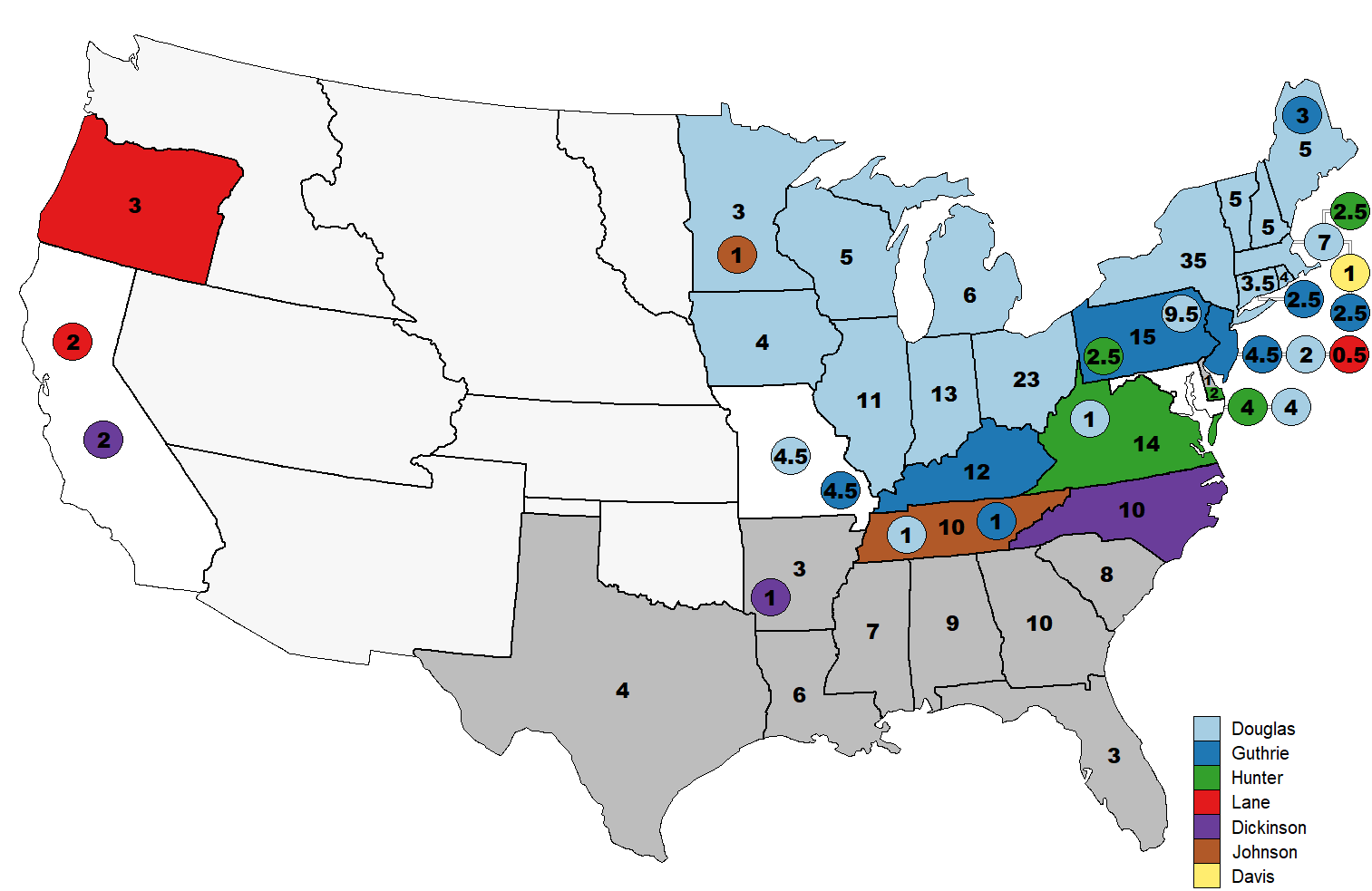
30th Ballot

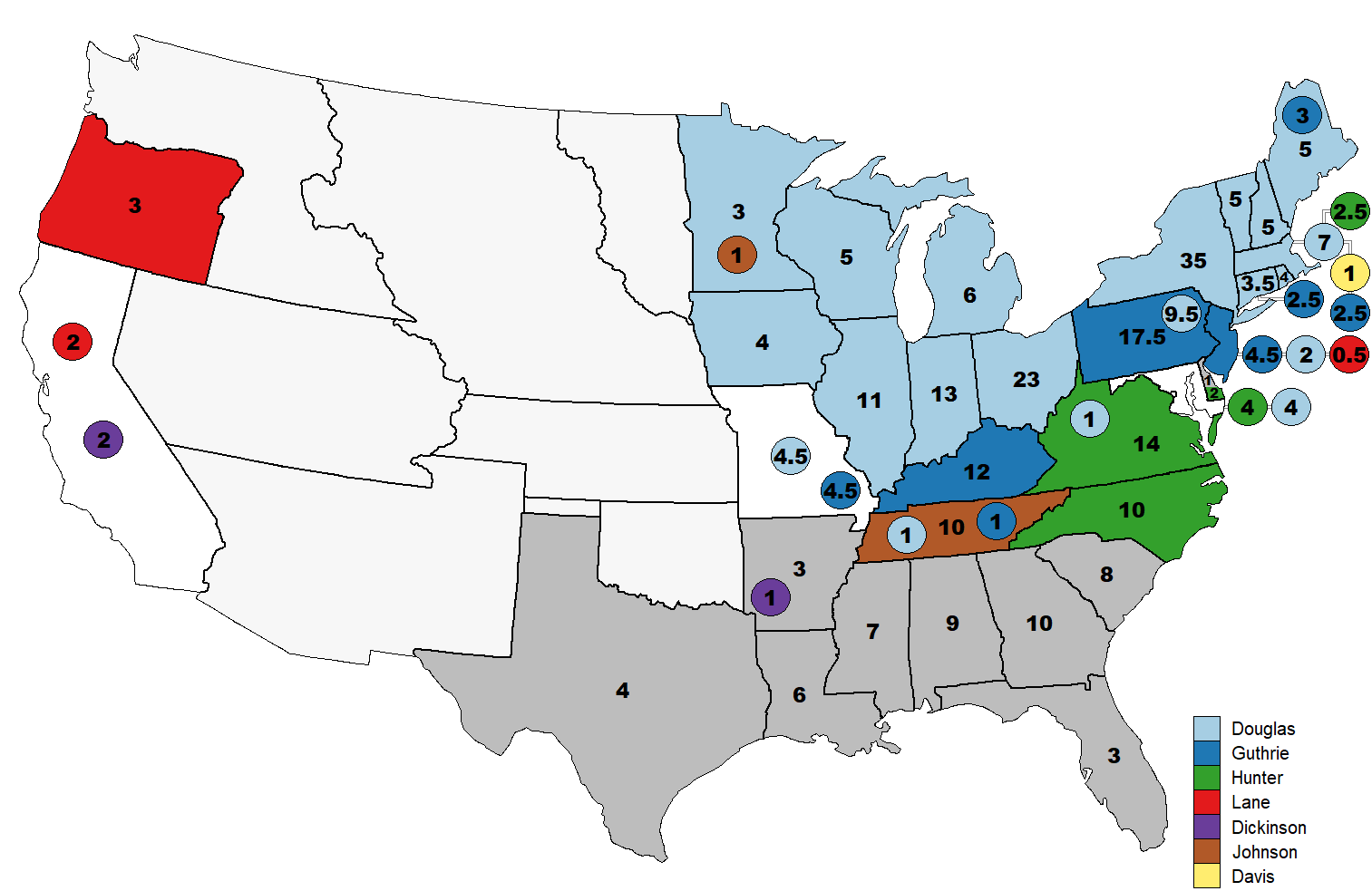
31st Ballot

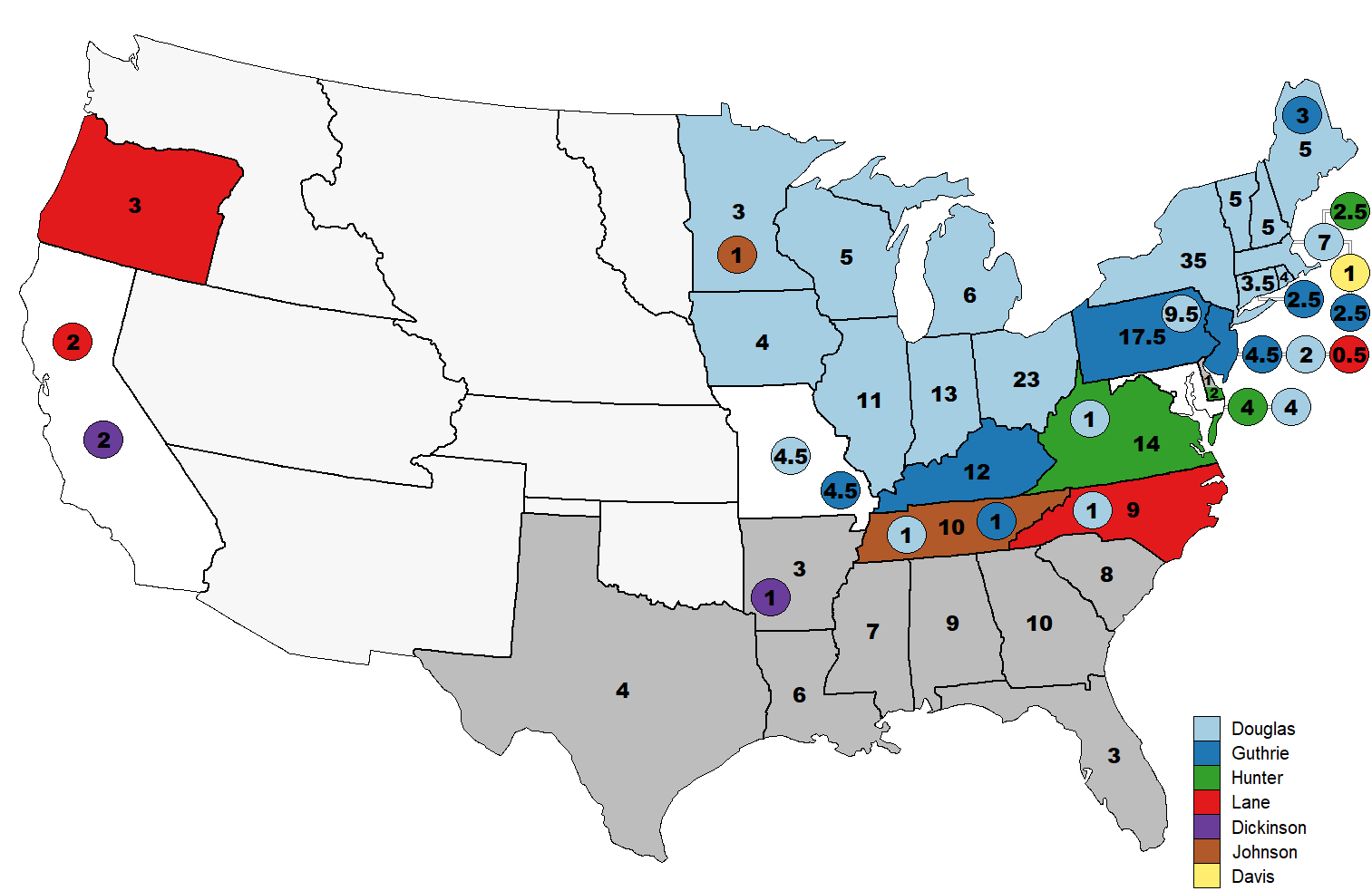
32nd Ballot

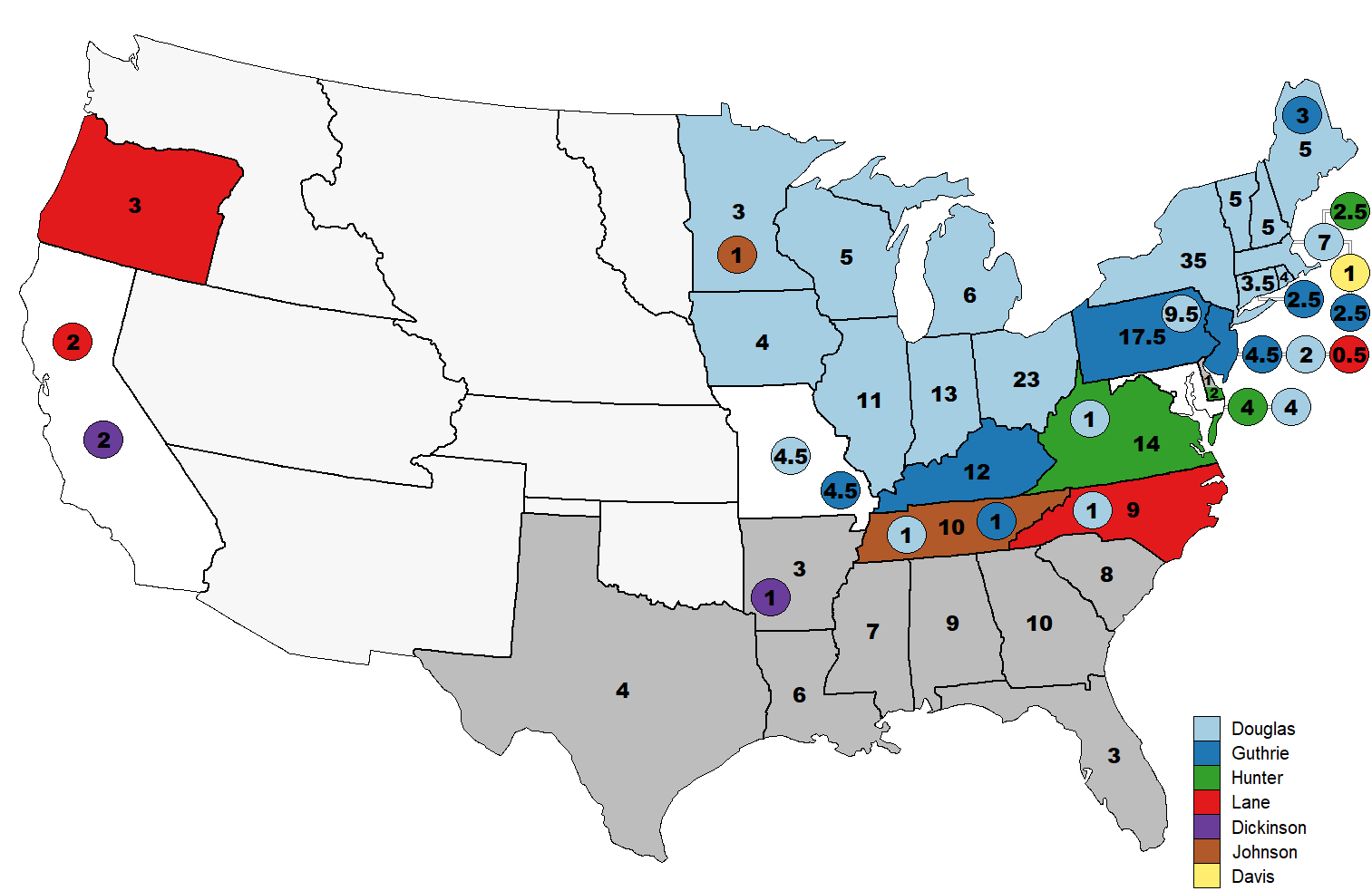
33rd Ballot

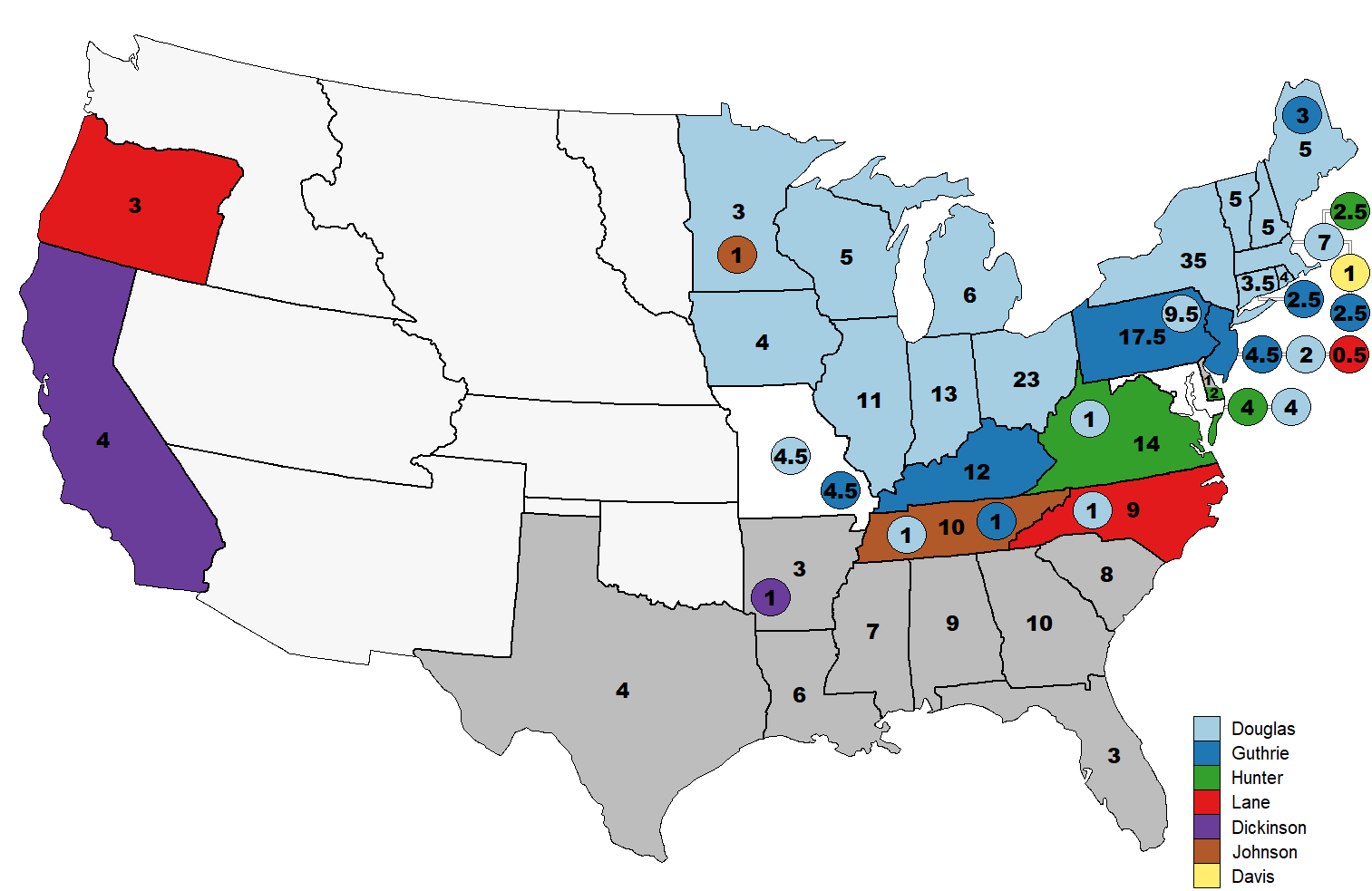
34th Ballot

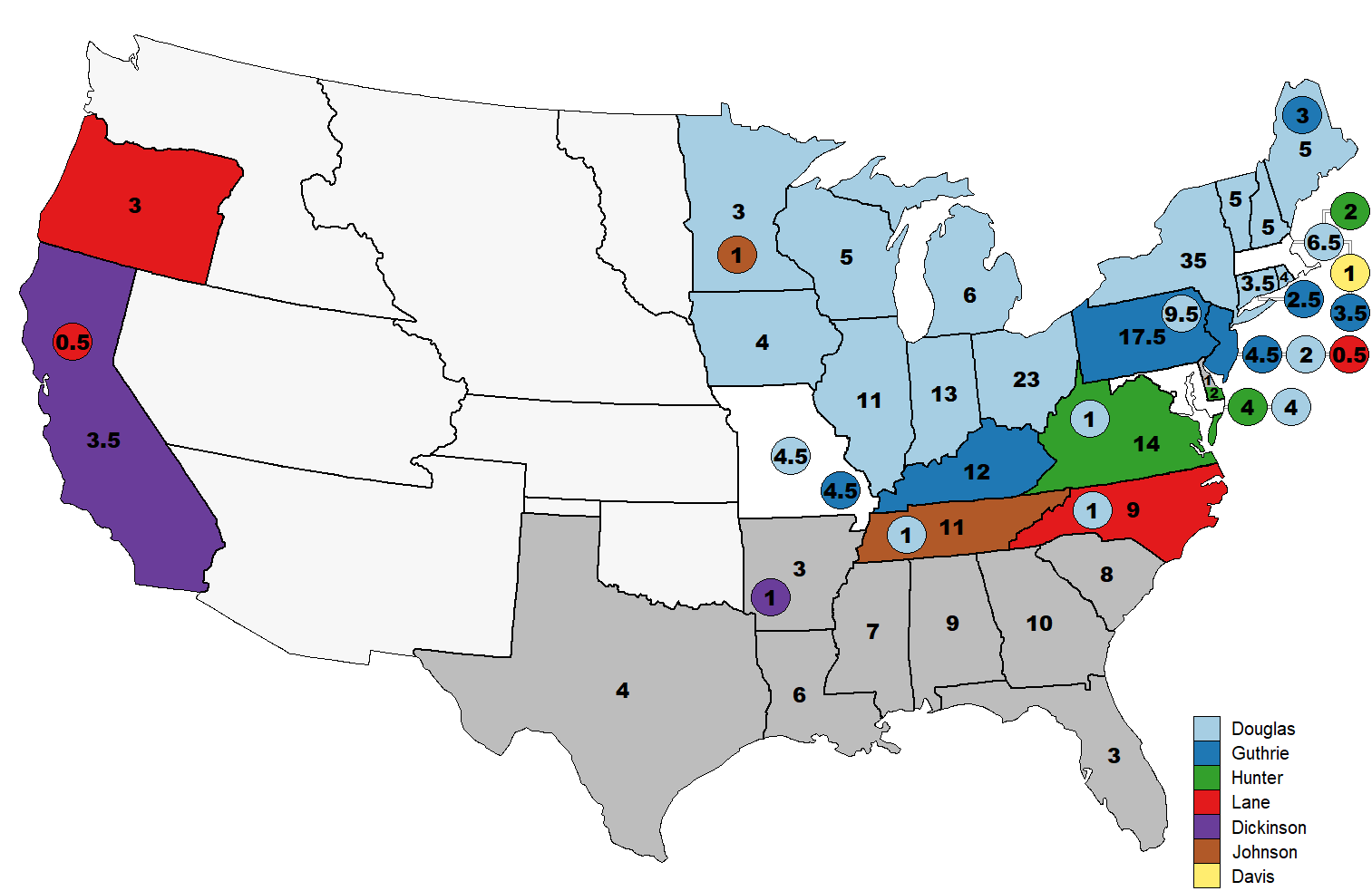
35th Ballot

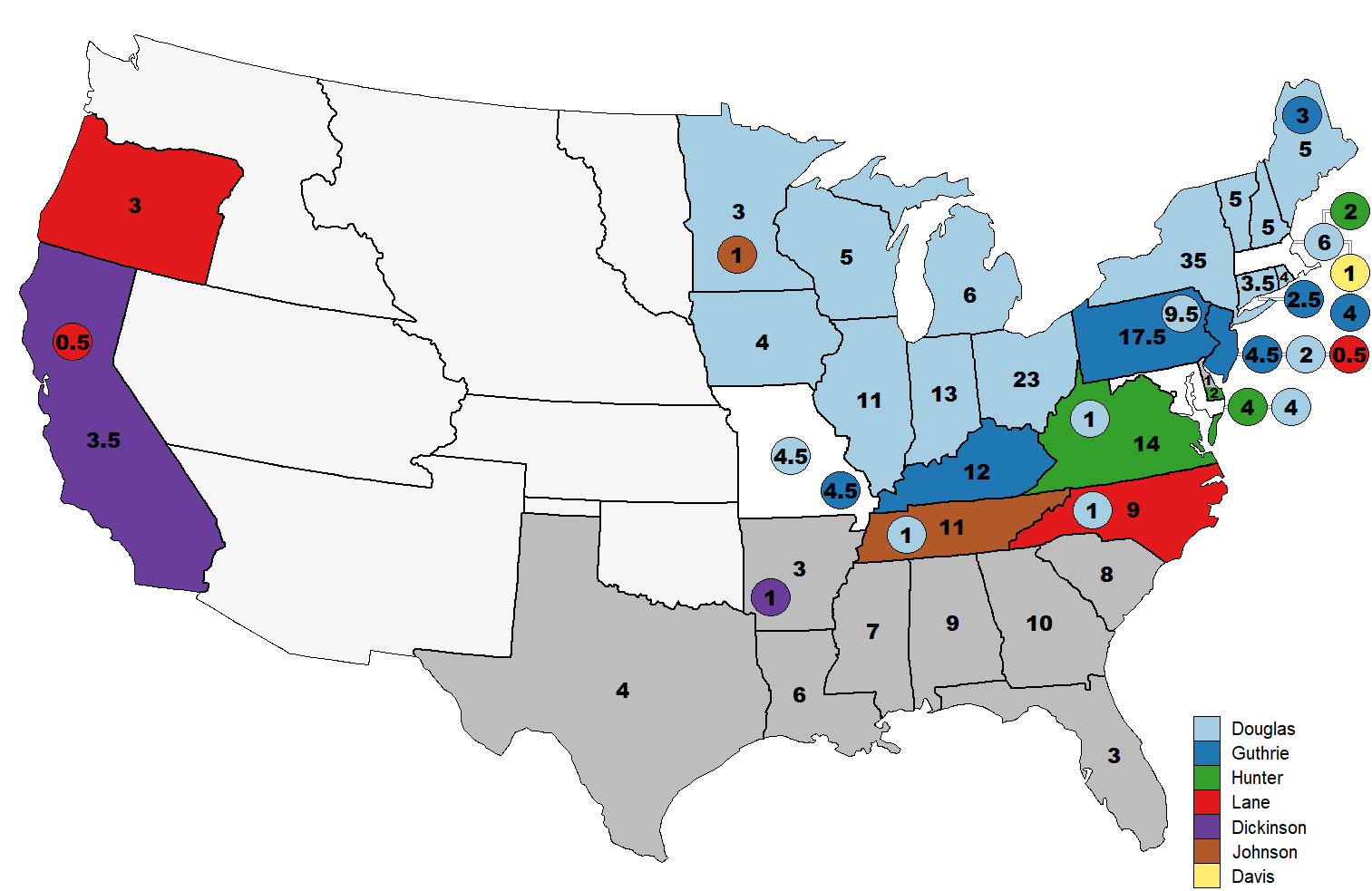
36th Ballot

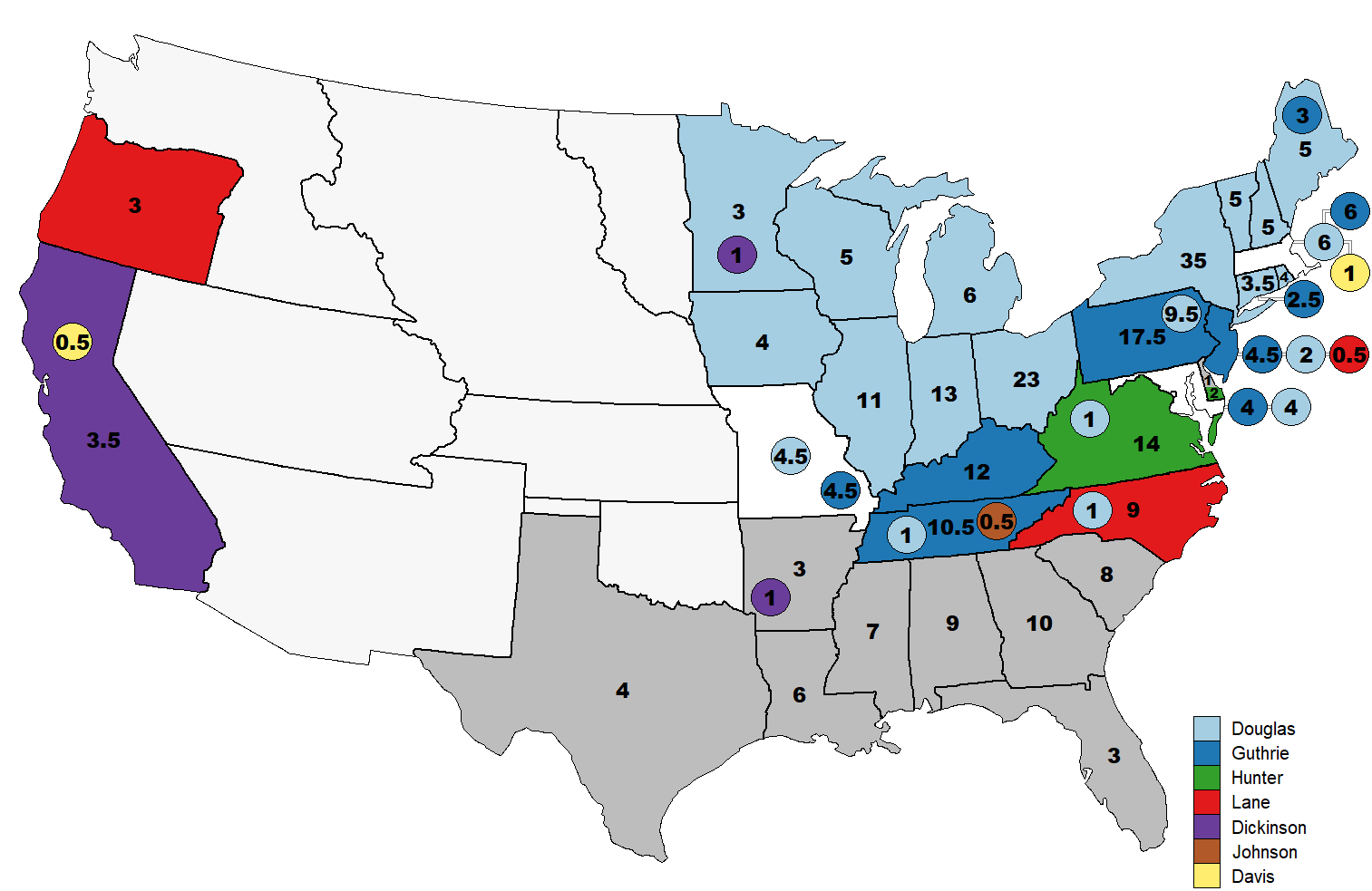
37th Ballot

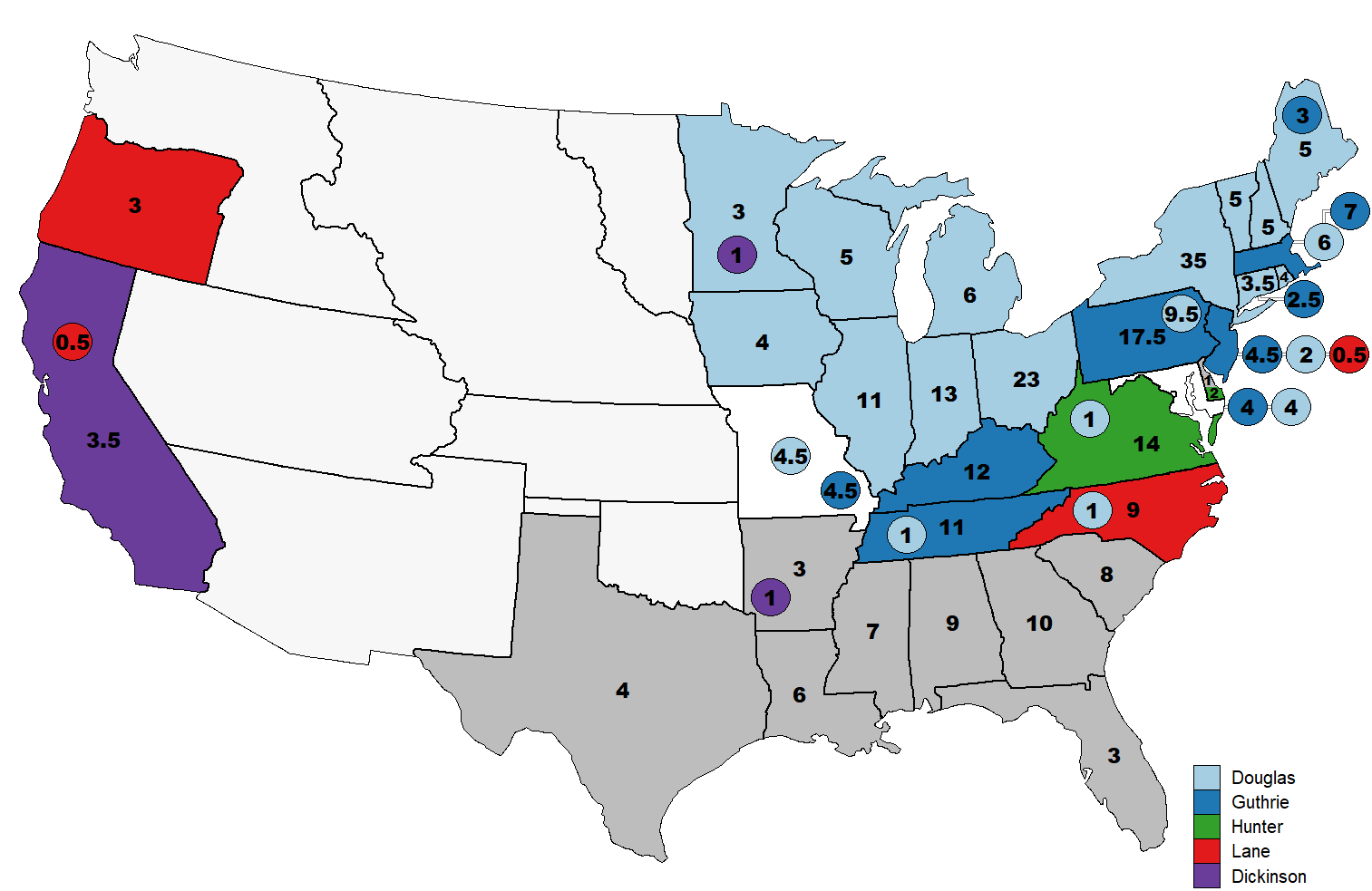
38th Ballot

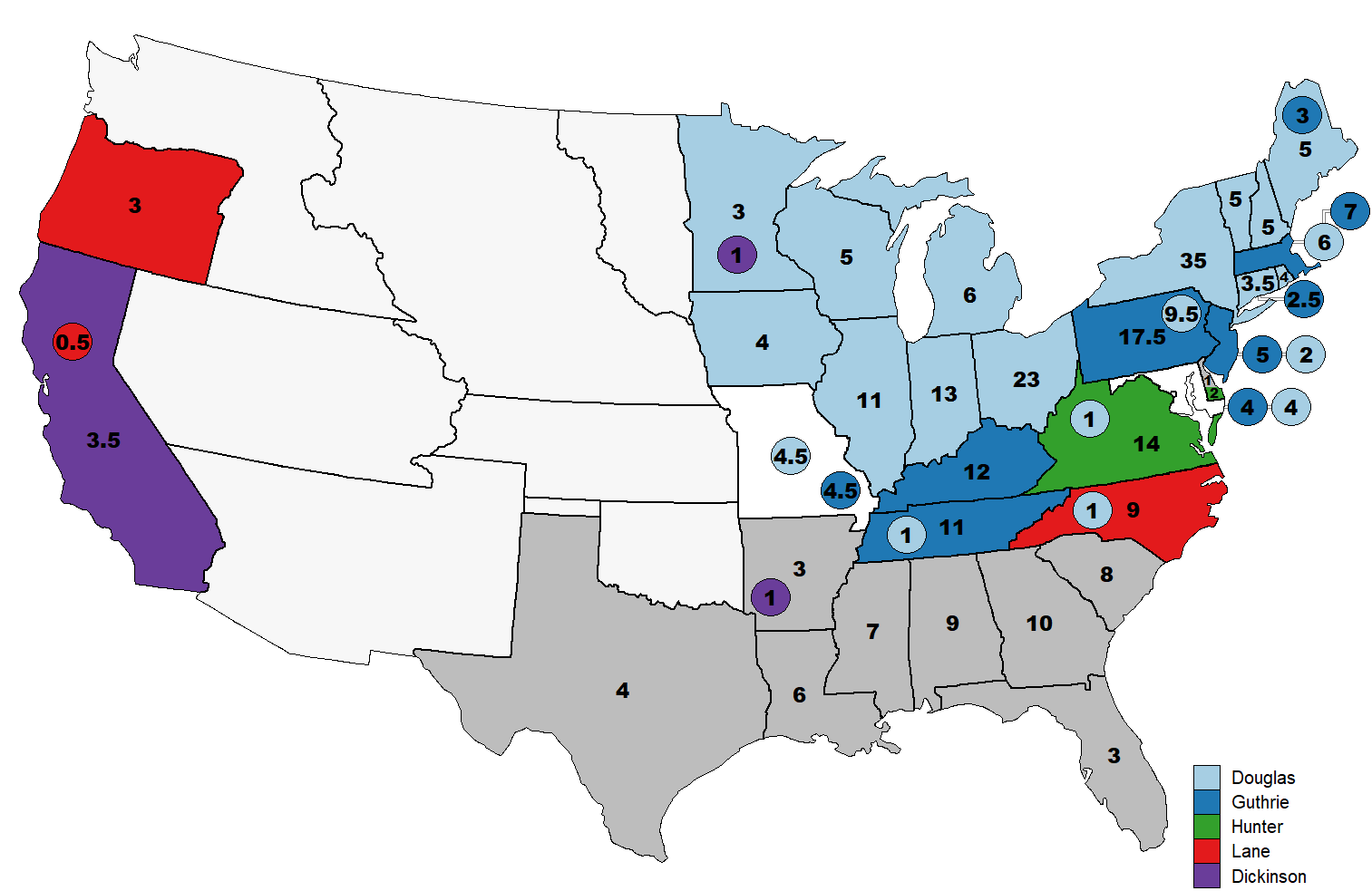
39th Ballot

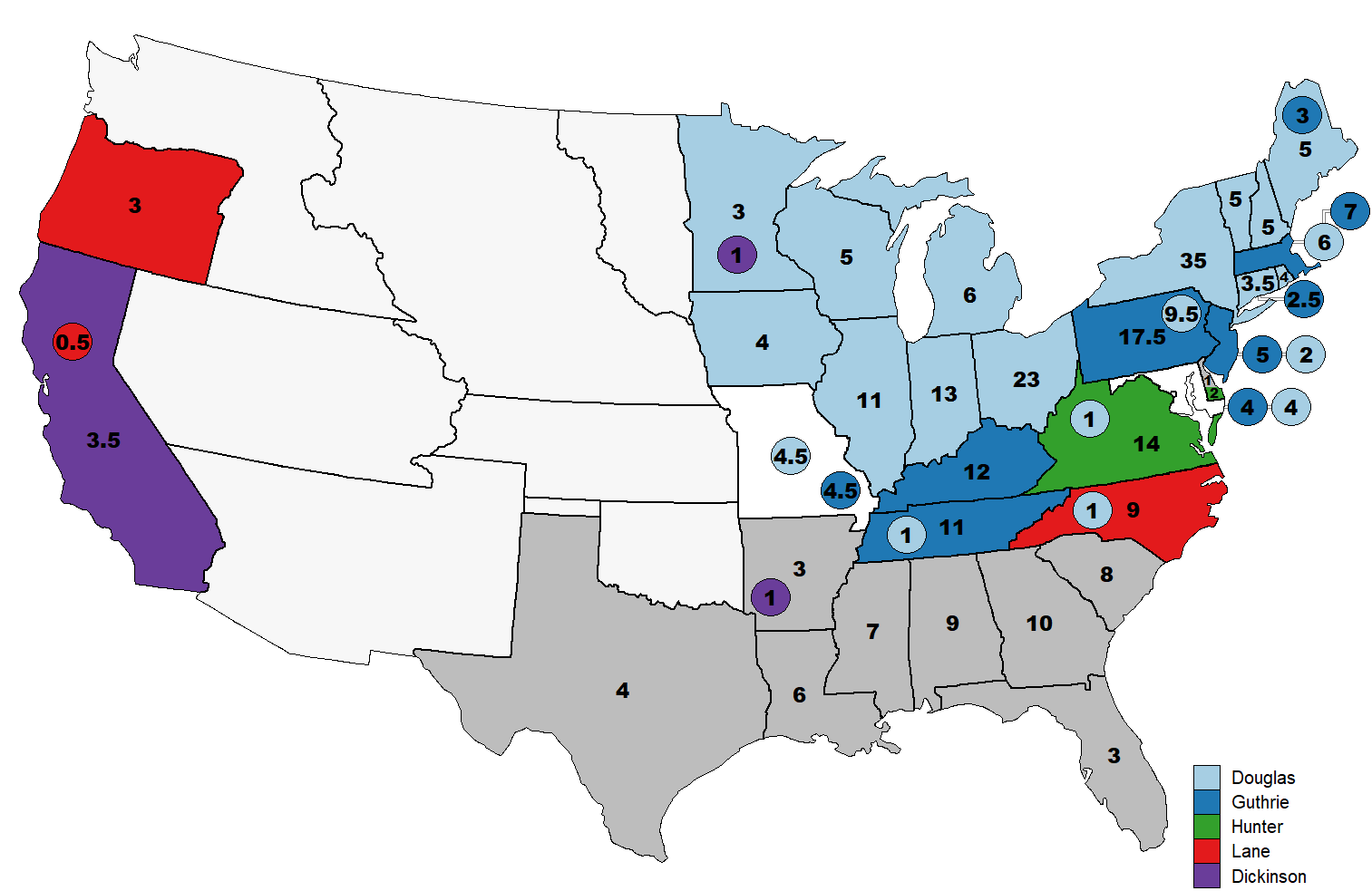
40th Ballot

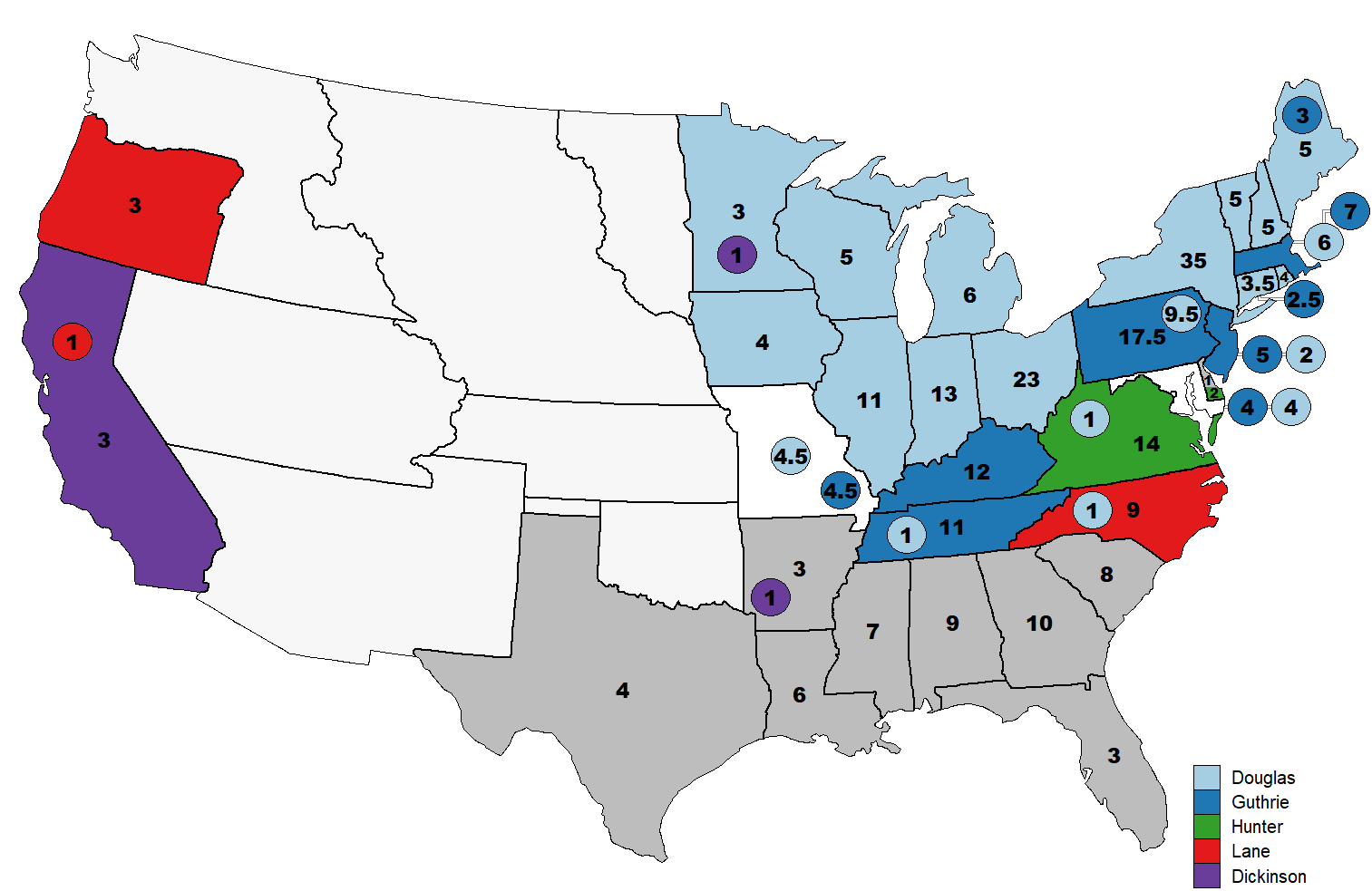
41st Ballot

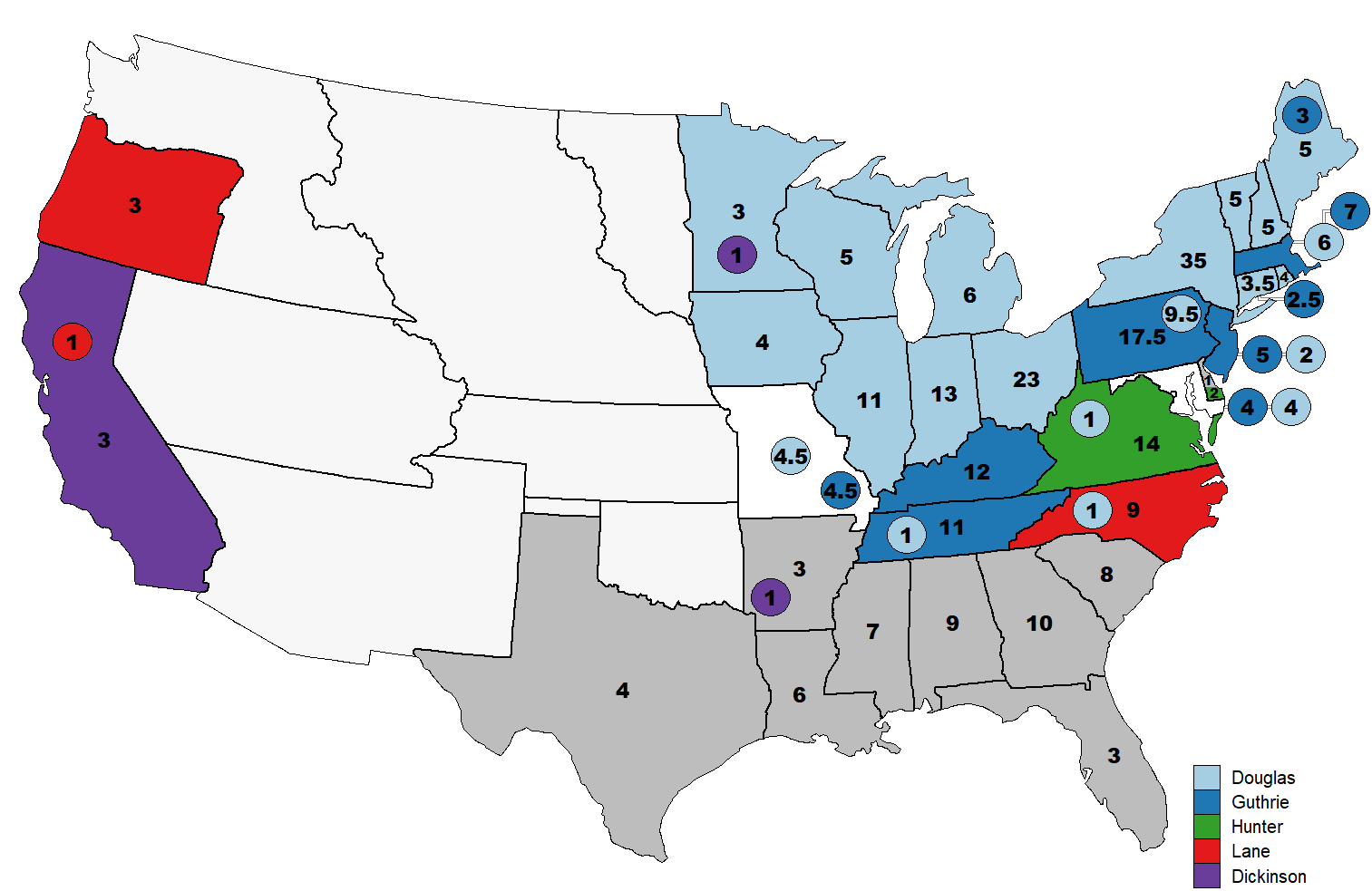
42nd Ballot

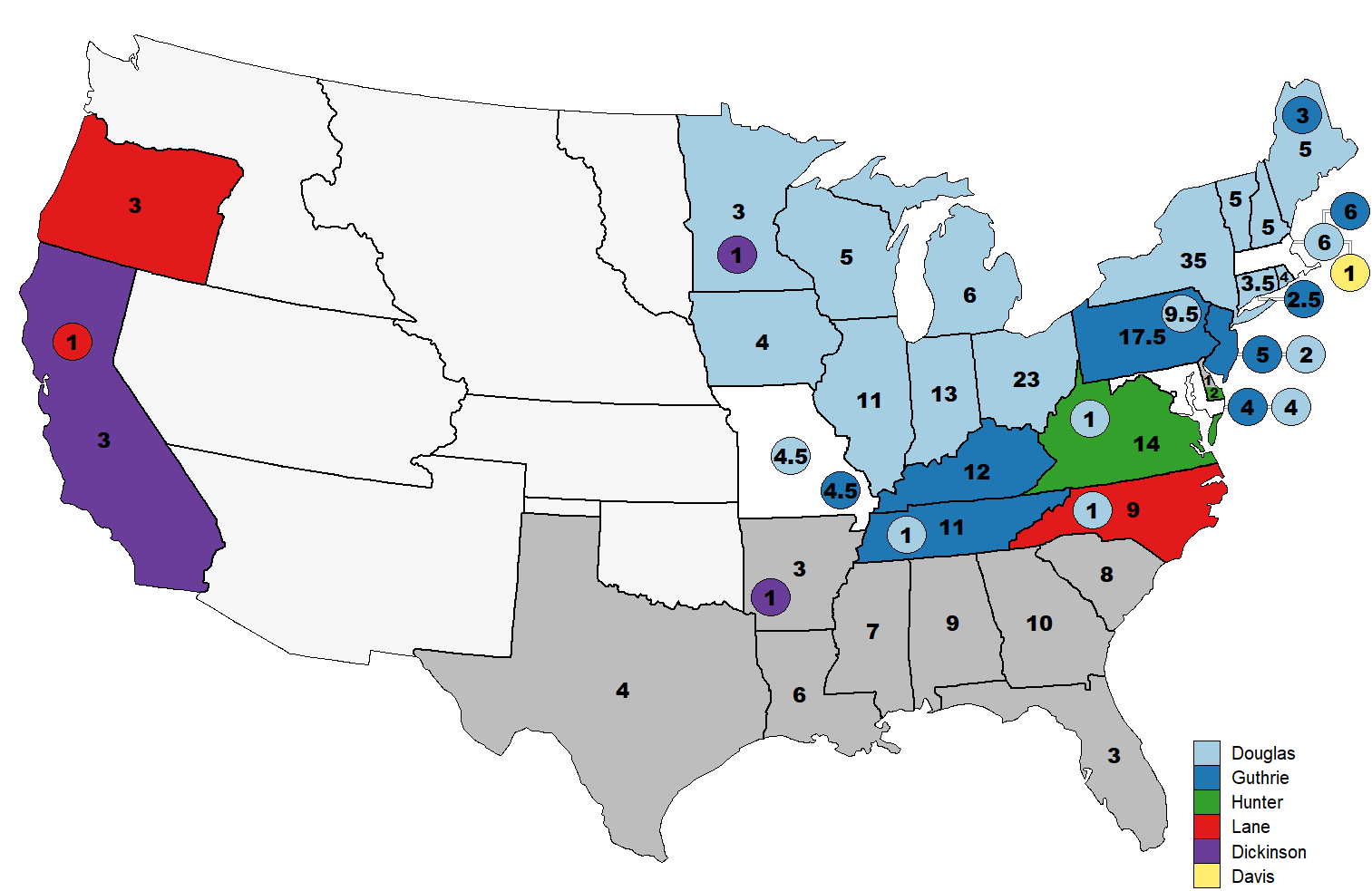
43rd Ballot

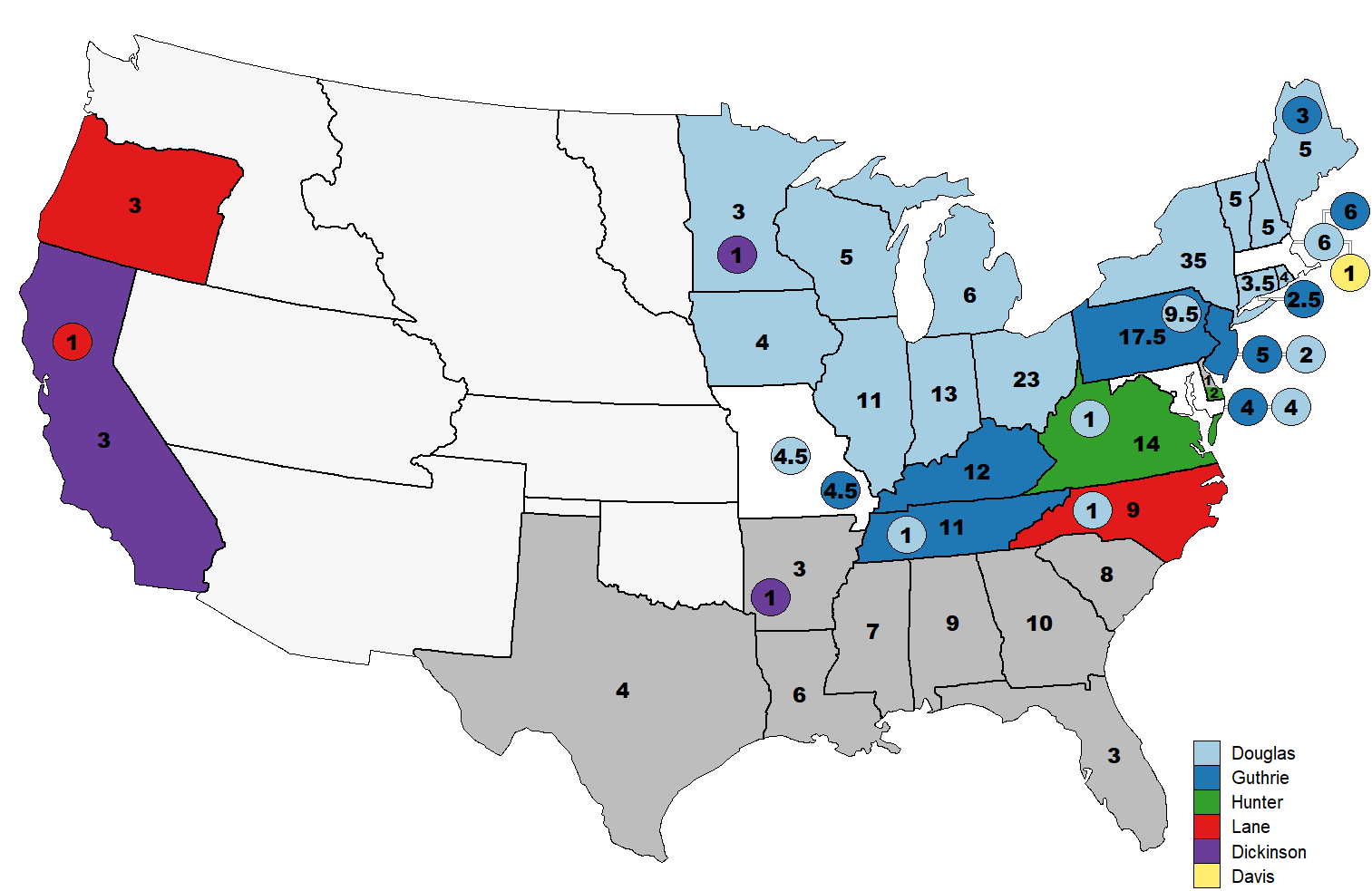
44th Ballot

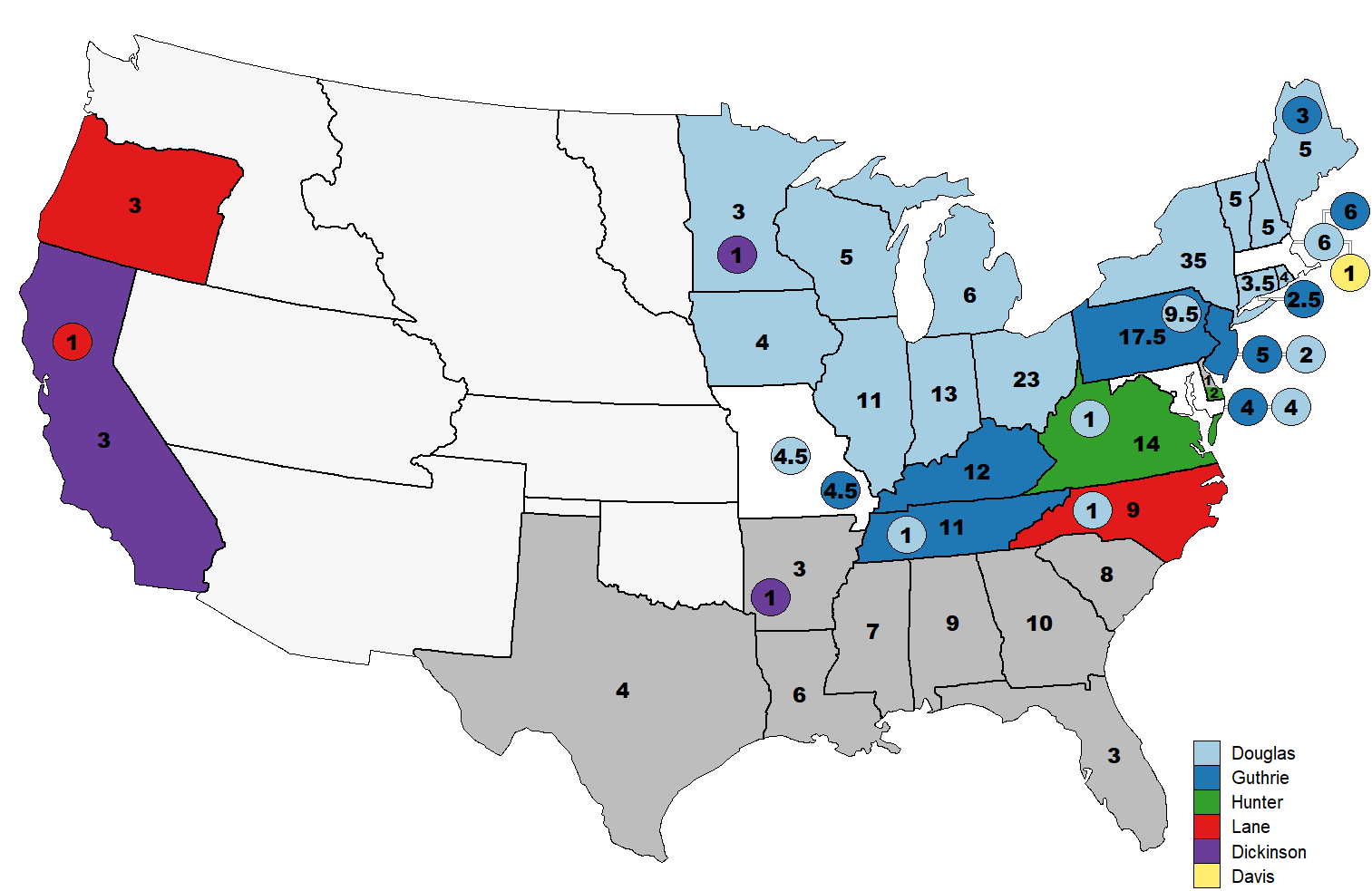
45th Ballot

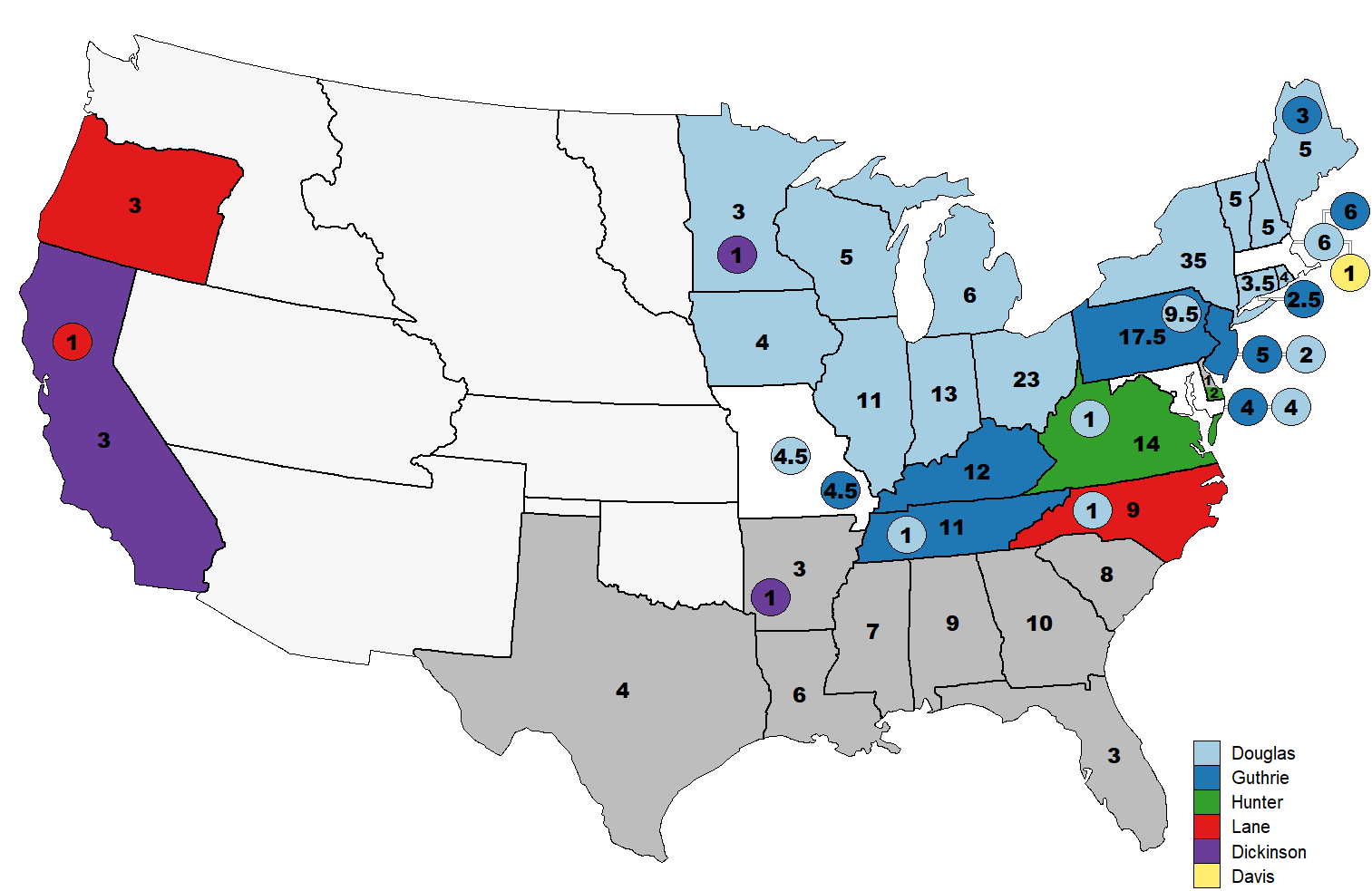
46th Ballot

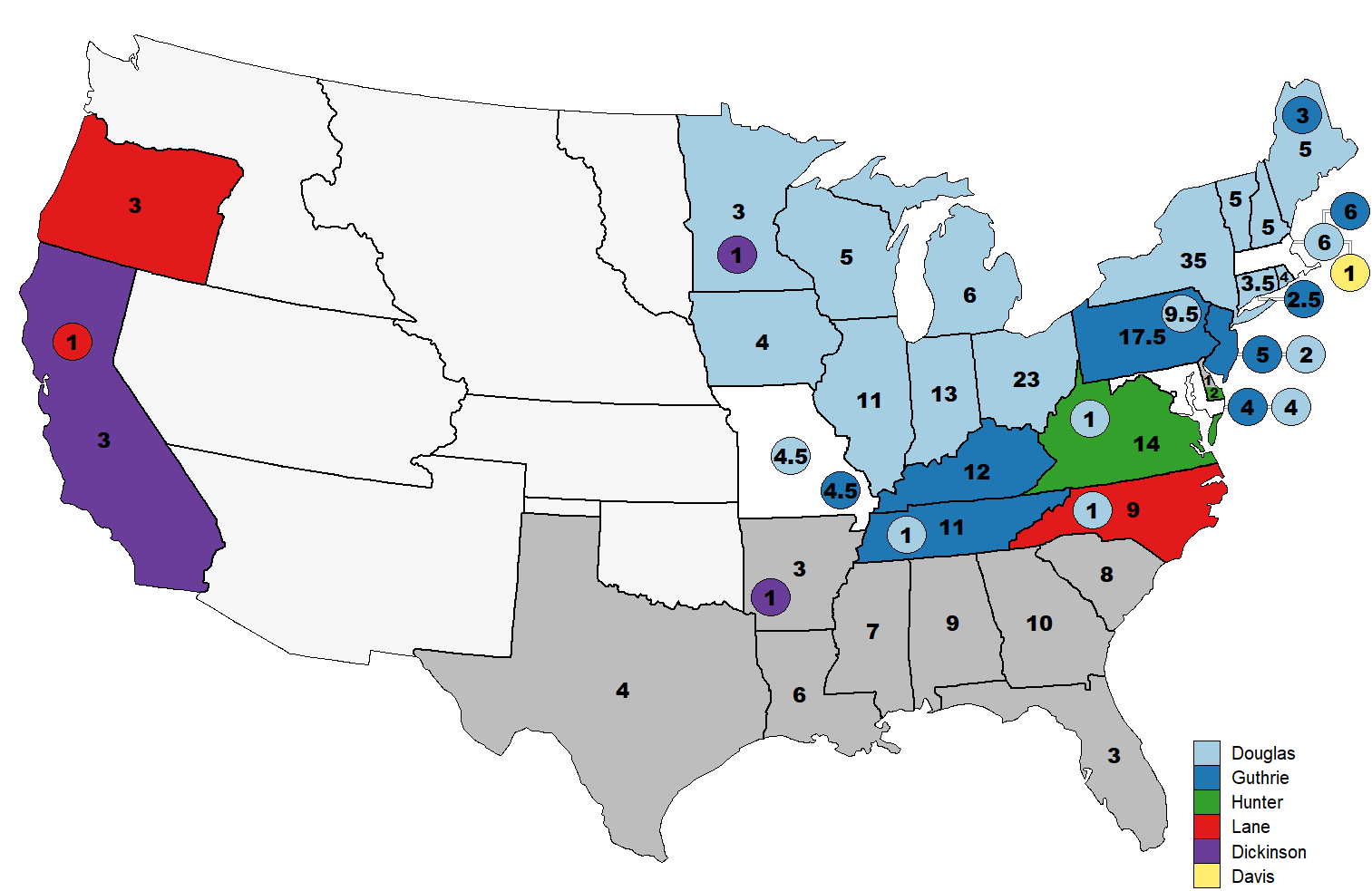
47th Ballot

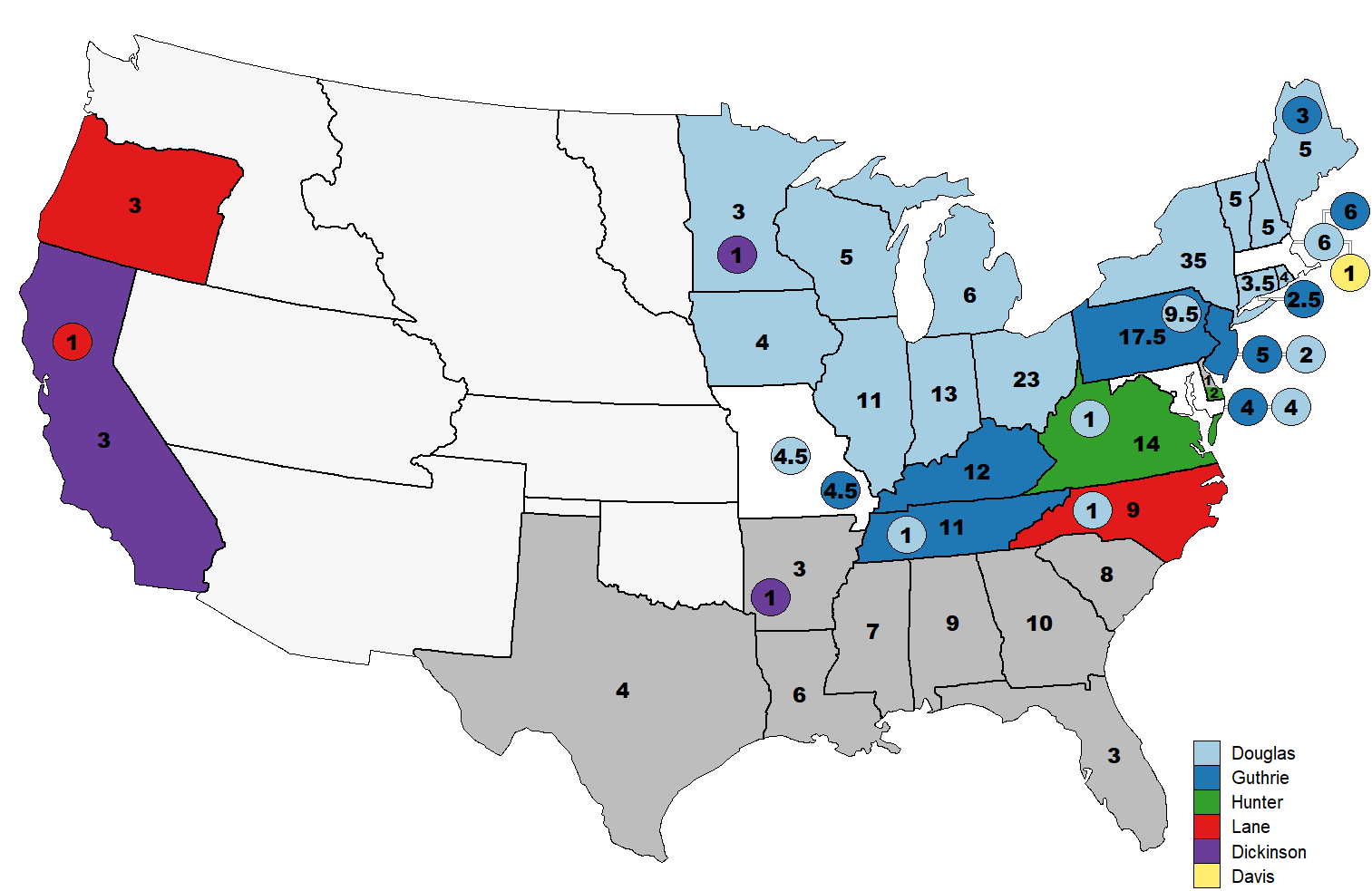
48th Ballot

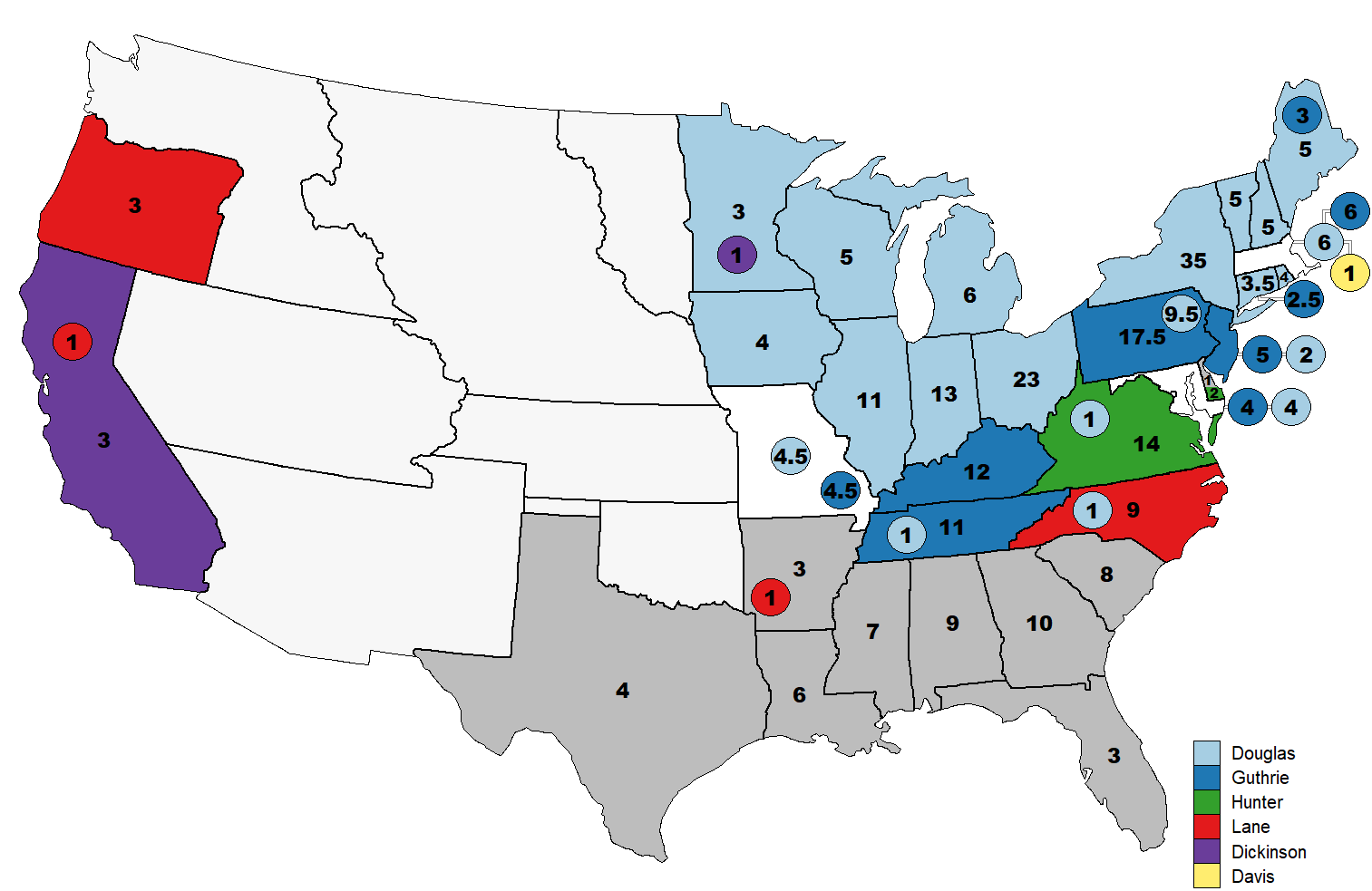
49th Ballot

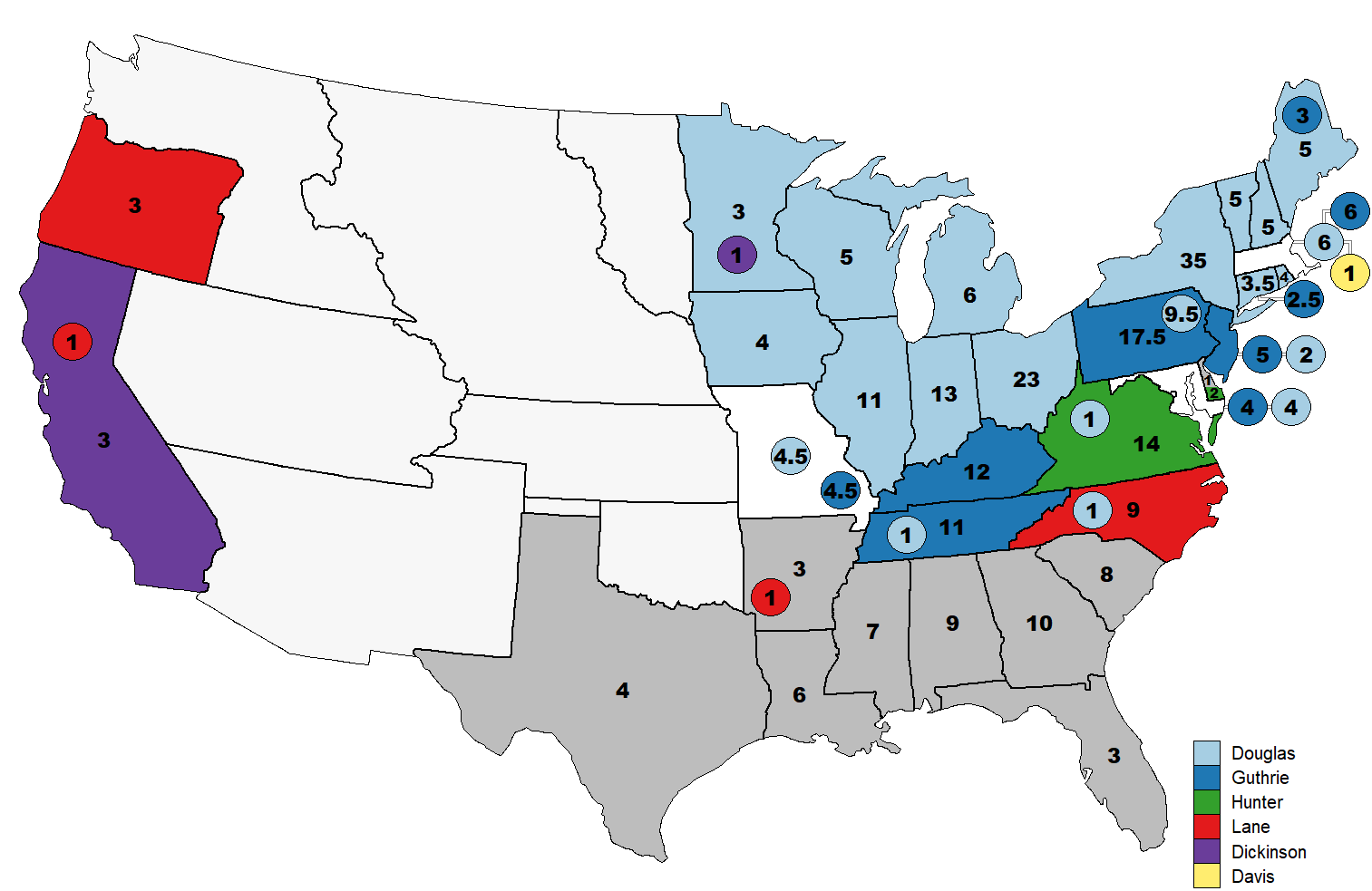
50th Ballot

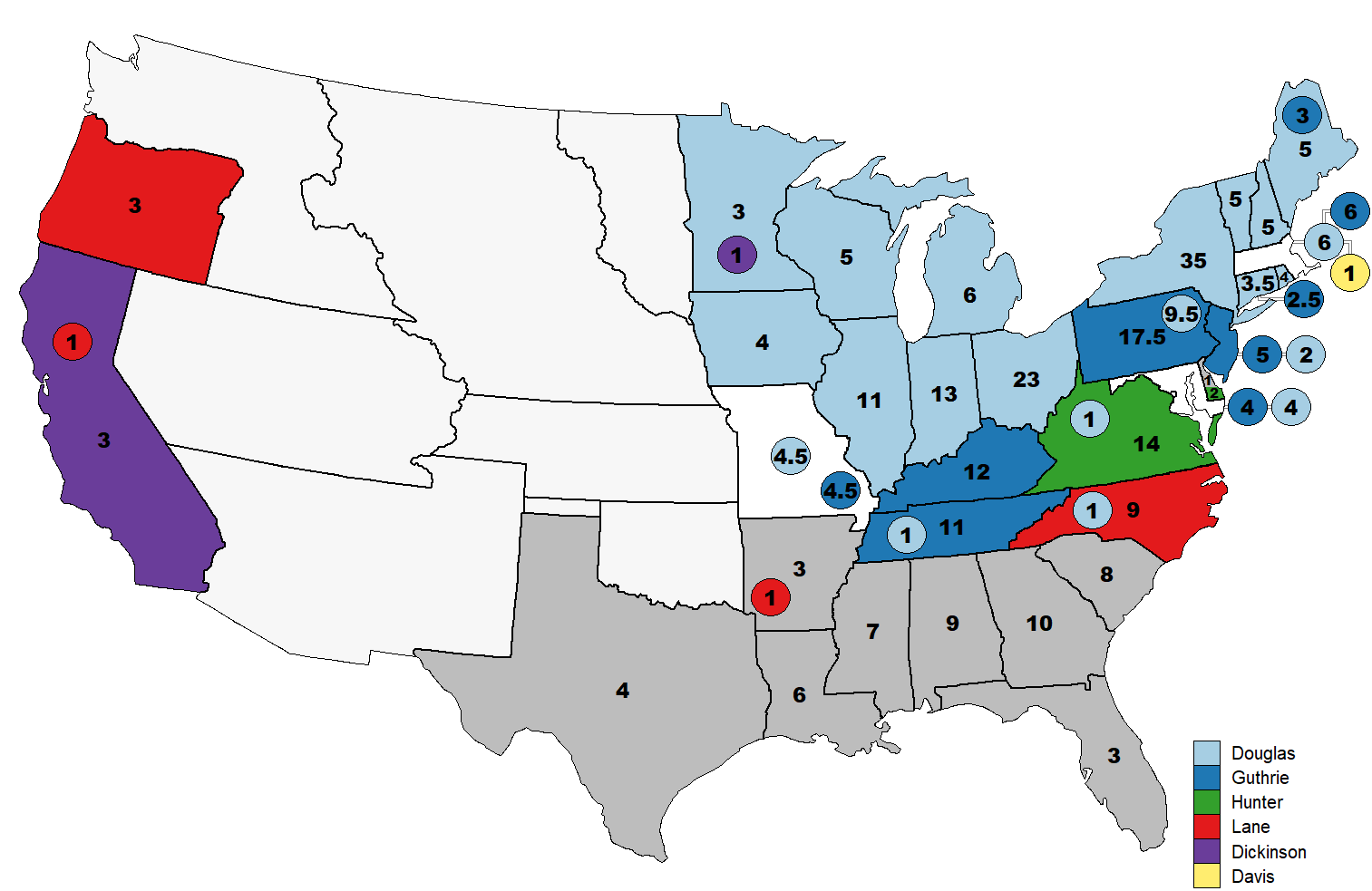
51st Ballot

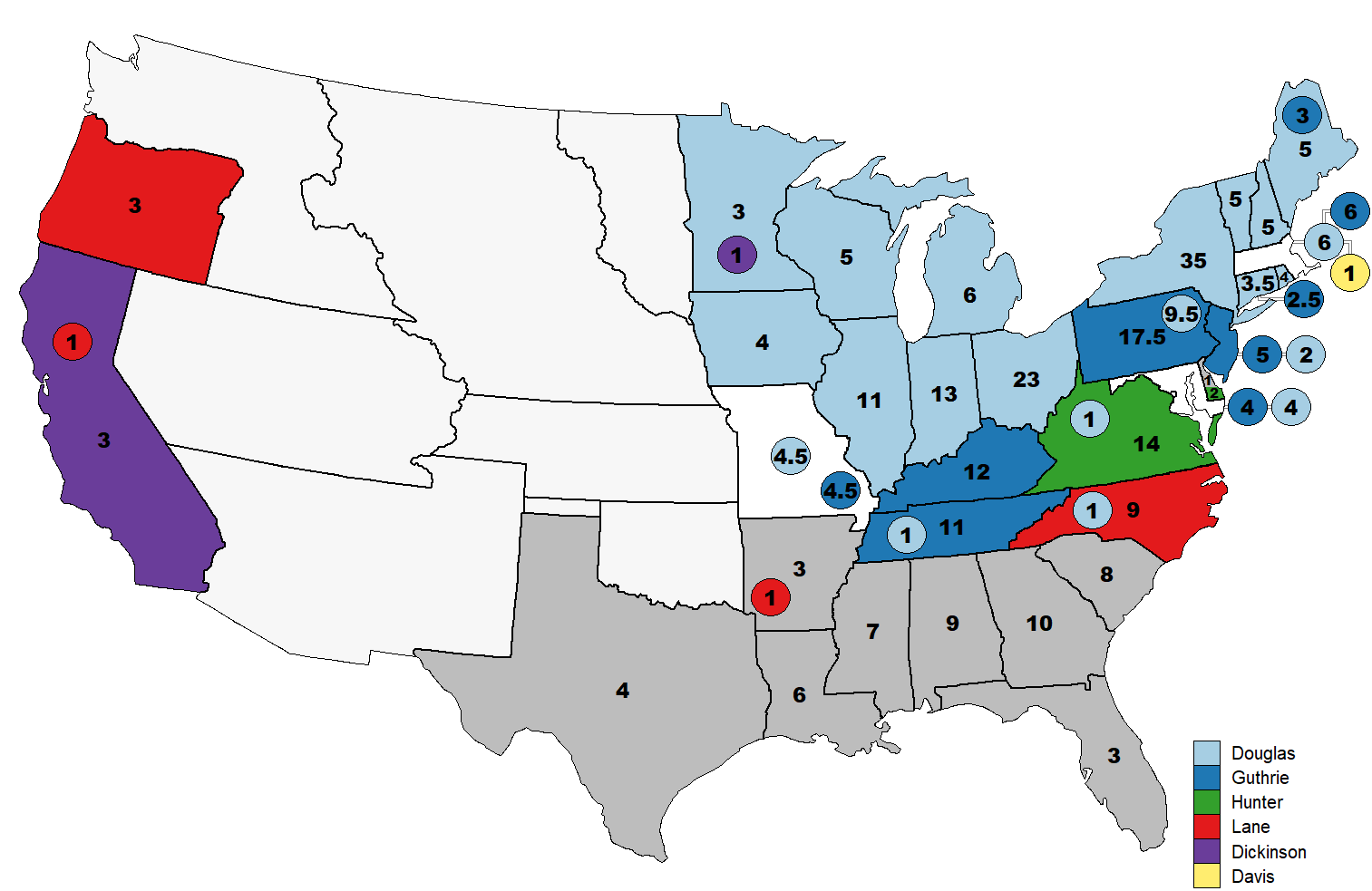
52nd Ballot

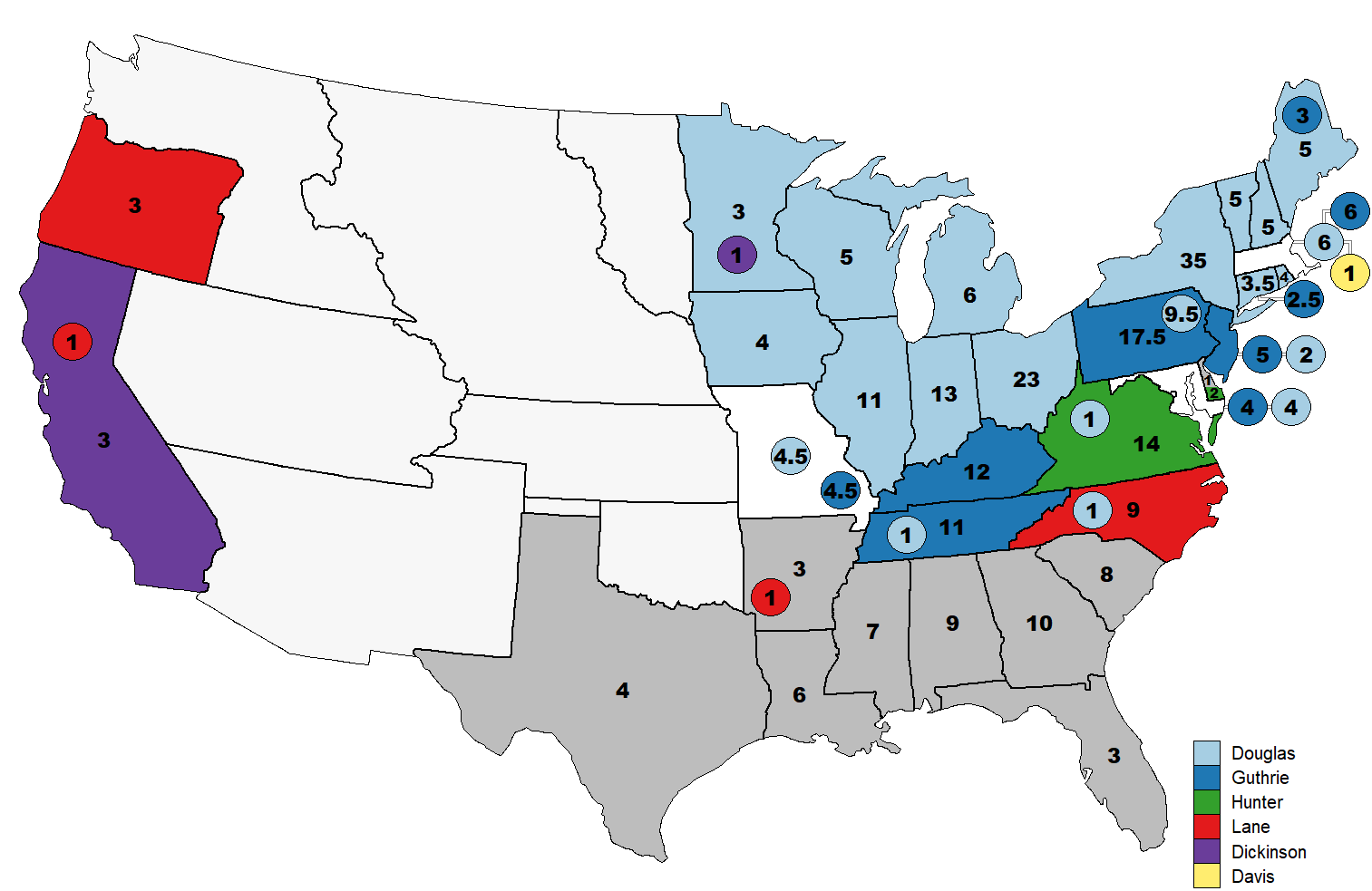
53rd Ballot

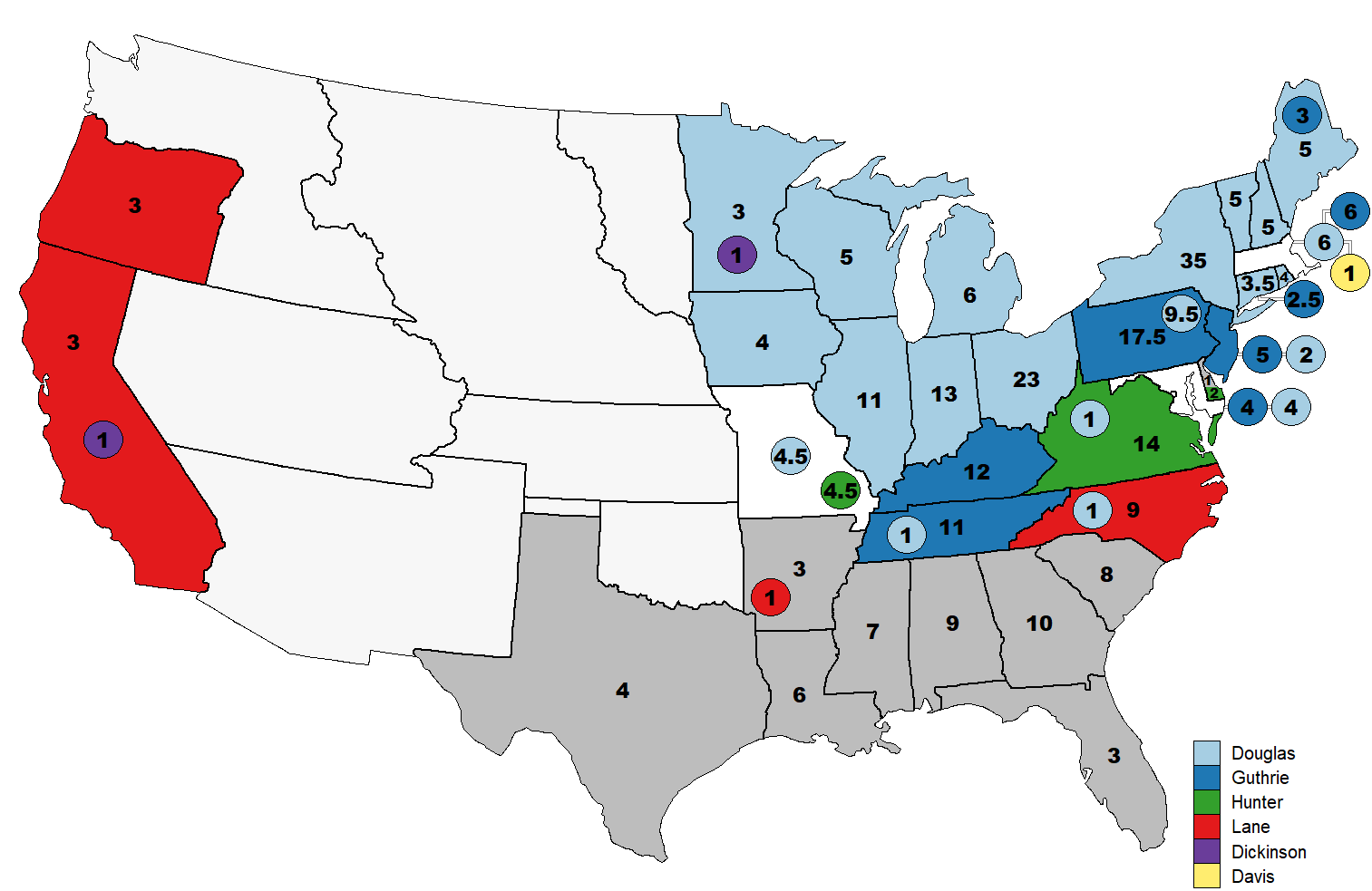
54th Ballot

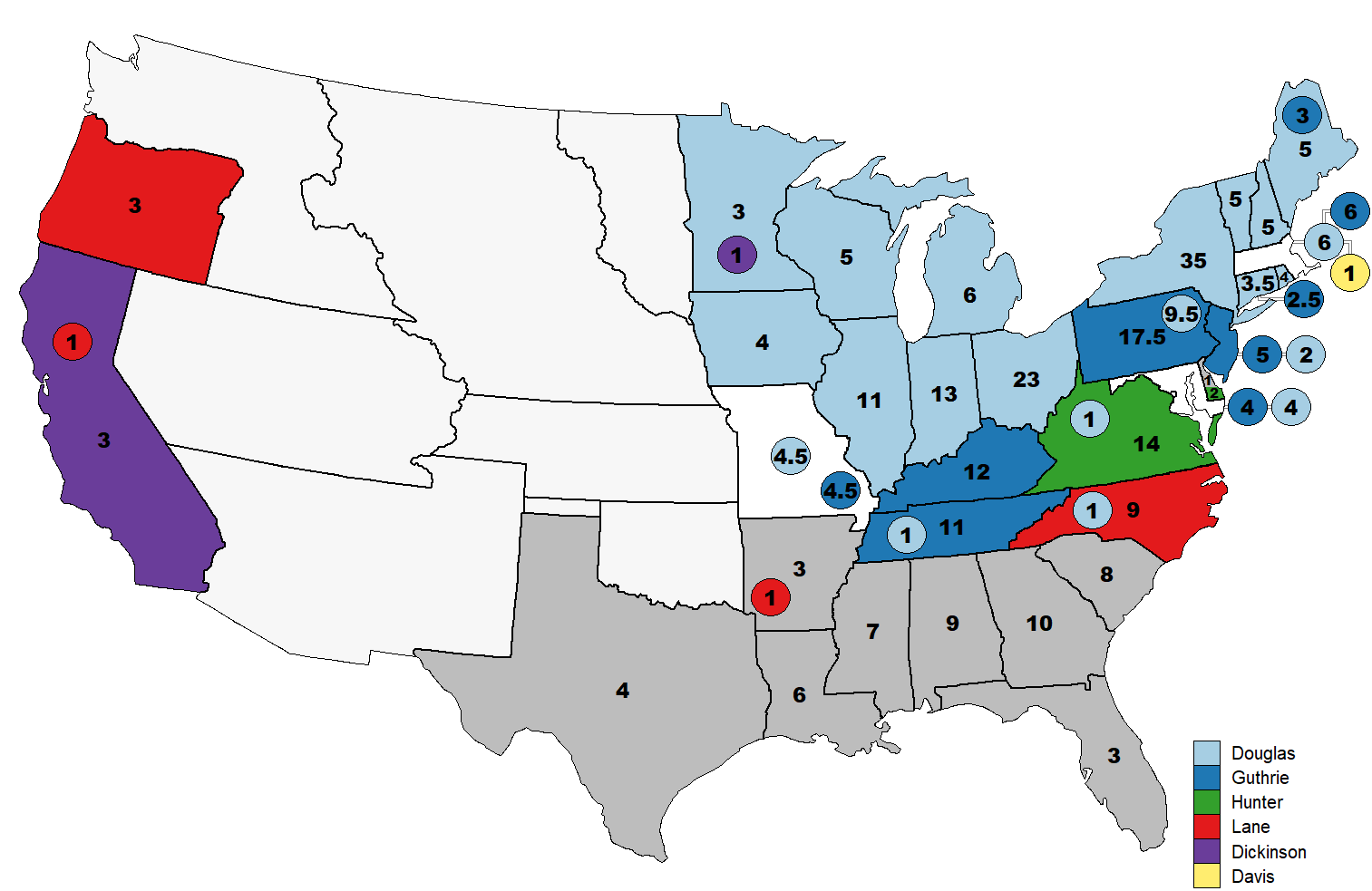
55th Ballot

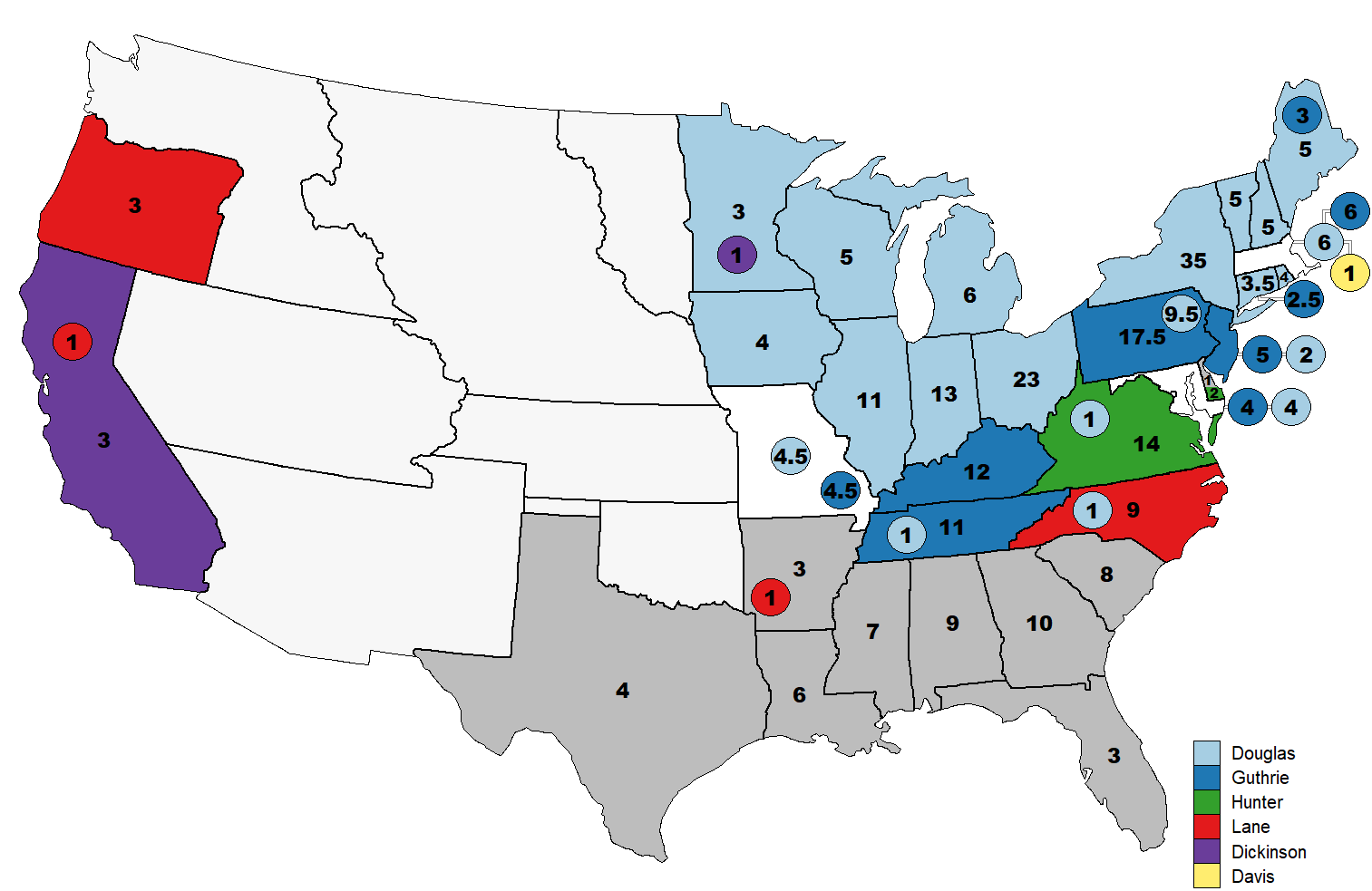
56th Ballot

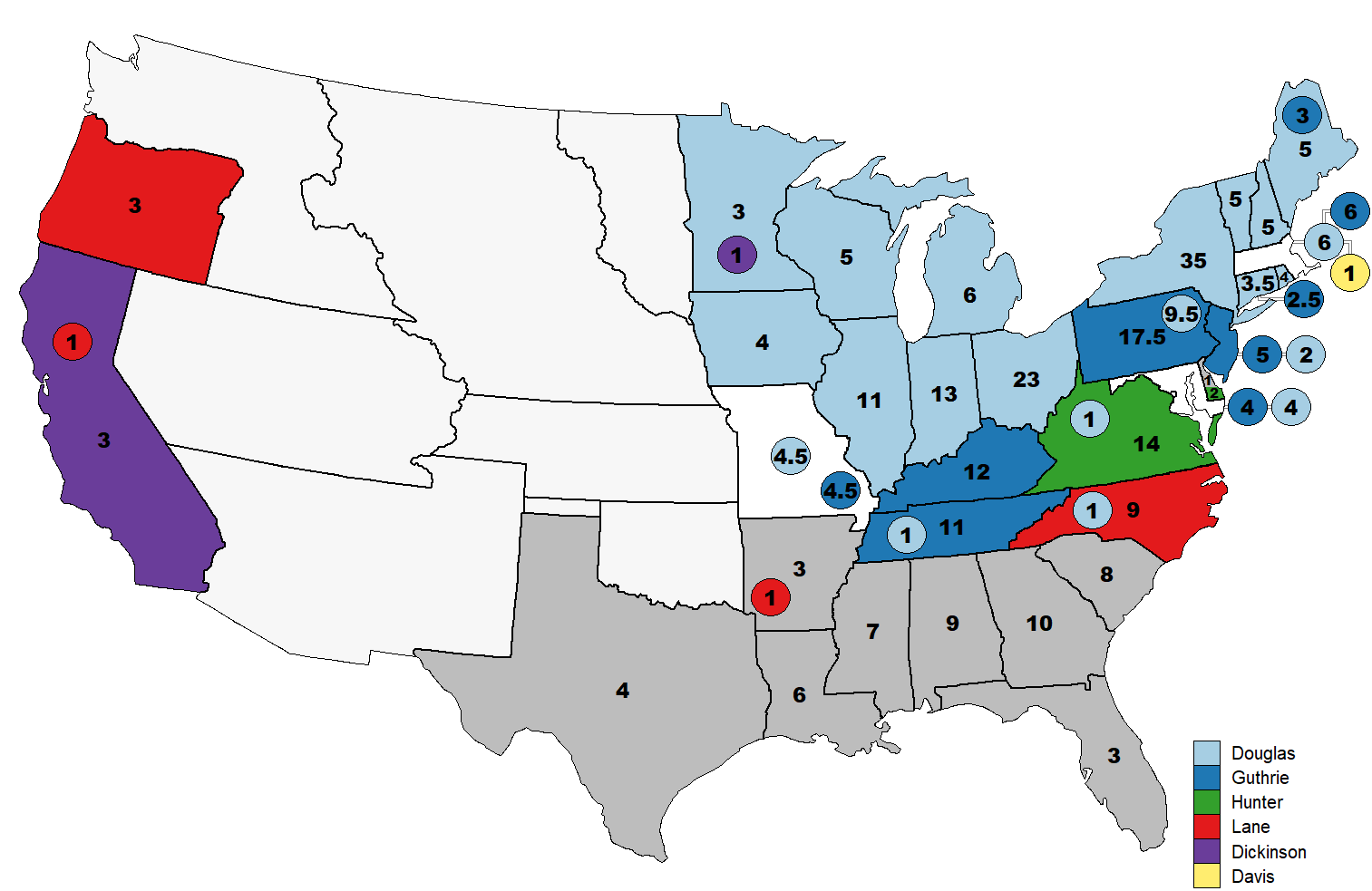
57th Ballot

== Baltimore convention (Northern Democratic) ==
The Democrats re-convened at the Front Street Theater in Baltimore, Maryland, on June 18.

=== Delegate re-admission disagreement ===
The southern walk-out delegates had reconvened at Metropolitan Hall in Richmond where it was decided by many delegates to attend the Baltimore convention before giving up on their fellow Democrats. However, the South Carolina delegation chose to remain in Richmond. The resumed convention's first business was to decide whether to re-admit the delegates who had walked out of the Charleston session, or to seat replacement delegates who had been named by pro-Douglas Democrats in some states: other delegates had boycotted the Baltimore convention.

The credentials committee's majority report recommended re-admitting all delegates except those from Louisiana and Alabama, while the minority report recommended re-admitting some of the Louisiana and Alabama delegates as well. On June 22, the minority (Southern) report failed to be substituted for that of the majority (Northern) report by a vote of 100 1/2-150.

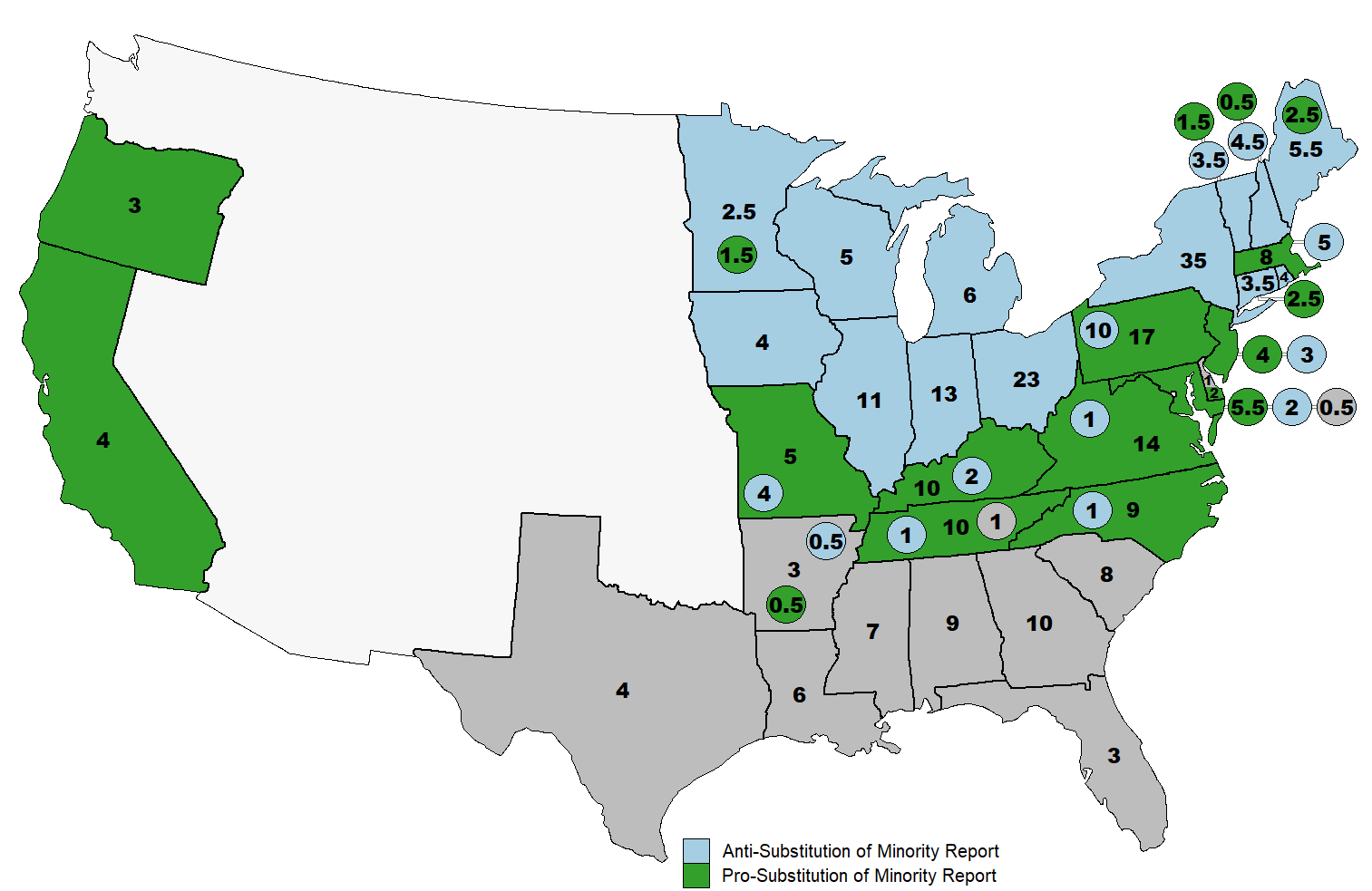
Minority Report Substitution Vote

After the rejection of the minority report, two votes were taken on the reconsideration of the substitution vote. At first, New York revived hopes of adopting the minority report by voting for its reconsideration. But during the second vote on reconsideration, New York switched back to its original vote.

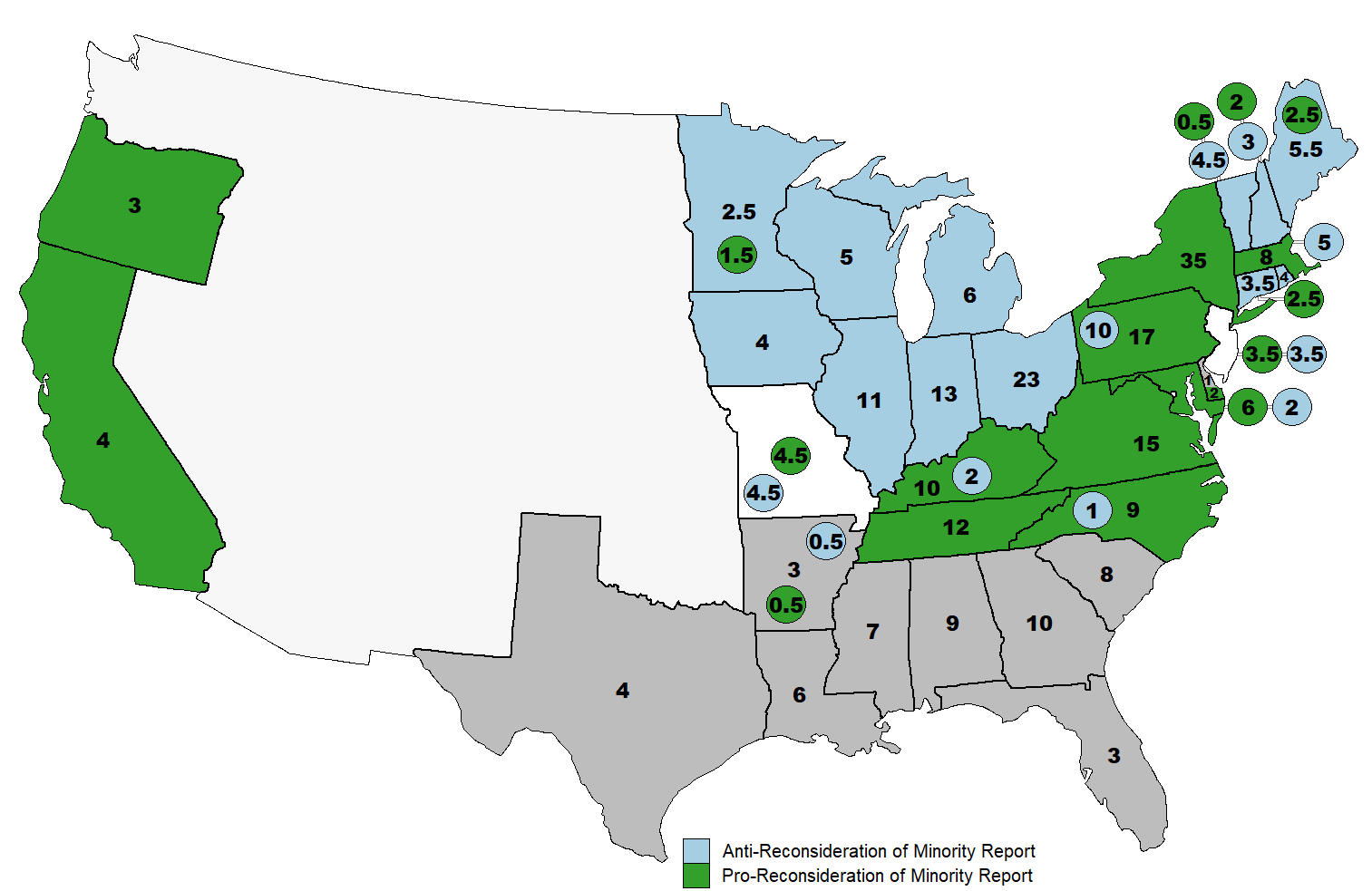
1st Reconsideration Vote

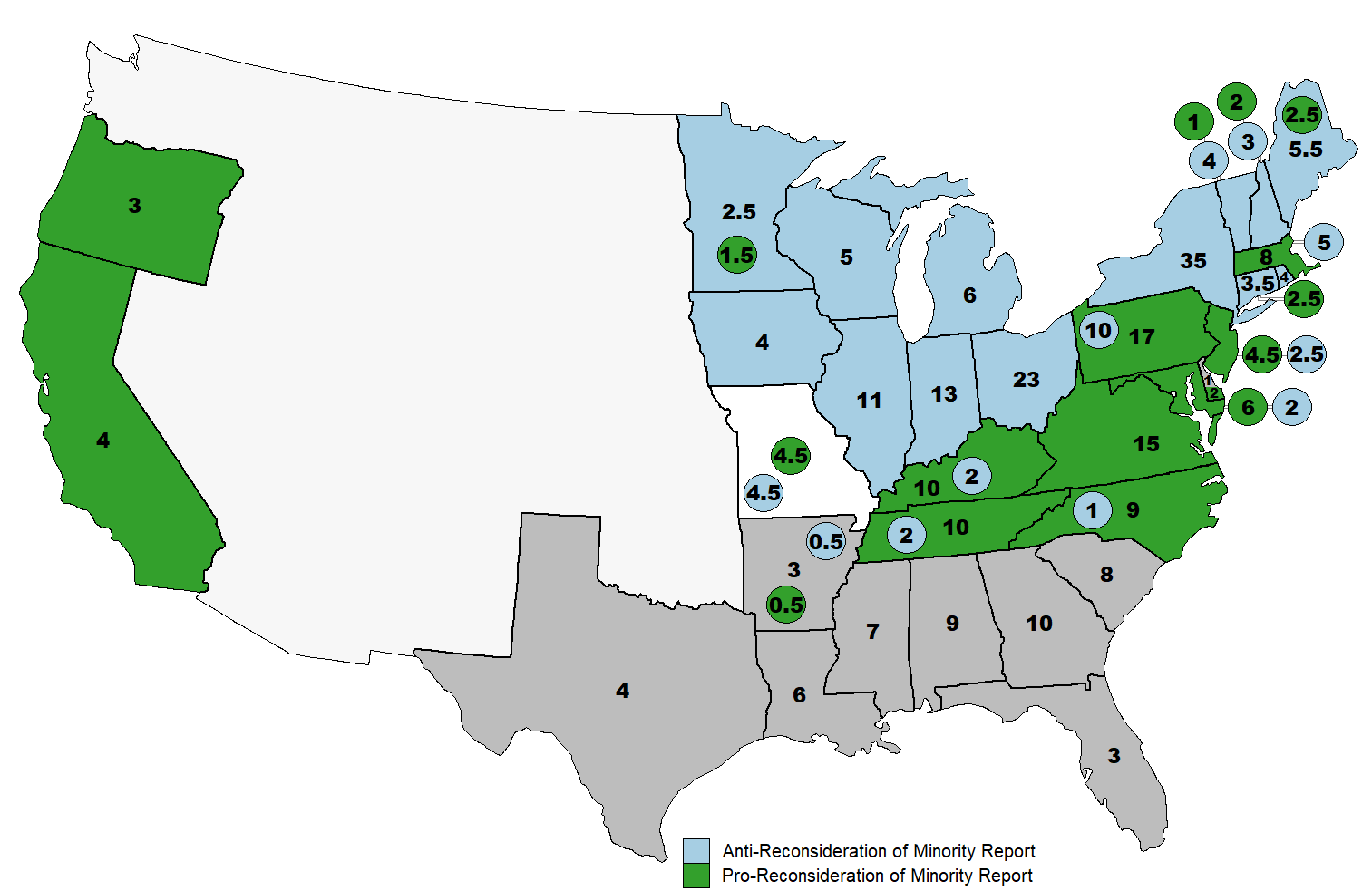
2nd Reconsideration Vote

With the admission of the new Louisiana and Alabama delegates, 56 delegates - most of those remaining from the South, and a scattering of delegates from northern and far western states - all walked out of the convention in protest.

=== Presidential balloting ===
After the convention resumed voting on a nominee, Douglas received 173 1/2 of the 190 1/2 votes cast on the first ballot (the 58th overall), and 181 1/2 votes of the 194 1/2 votes cast on the second ballot (the 59th overall).

A rollcall was taken following the second ballot, and it was realized that there were only 194 1/2 delegates present, meaning that there were insufficient delegates for Douglas to receive the 202 votes required by Cushing's ruling at the first convention.

After the delegates unanimously voted to rescind that ruling, it was declared by acclamation that Douglas had received the required two-thirds of the votes cast, and he was therefore nominated.

==== Presidential candidates ====
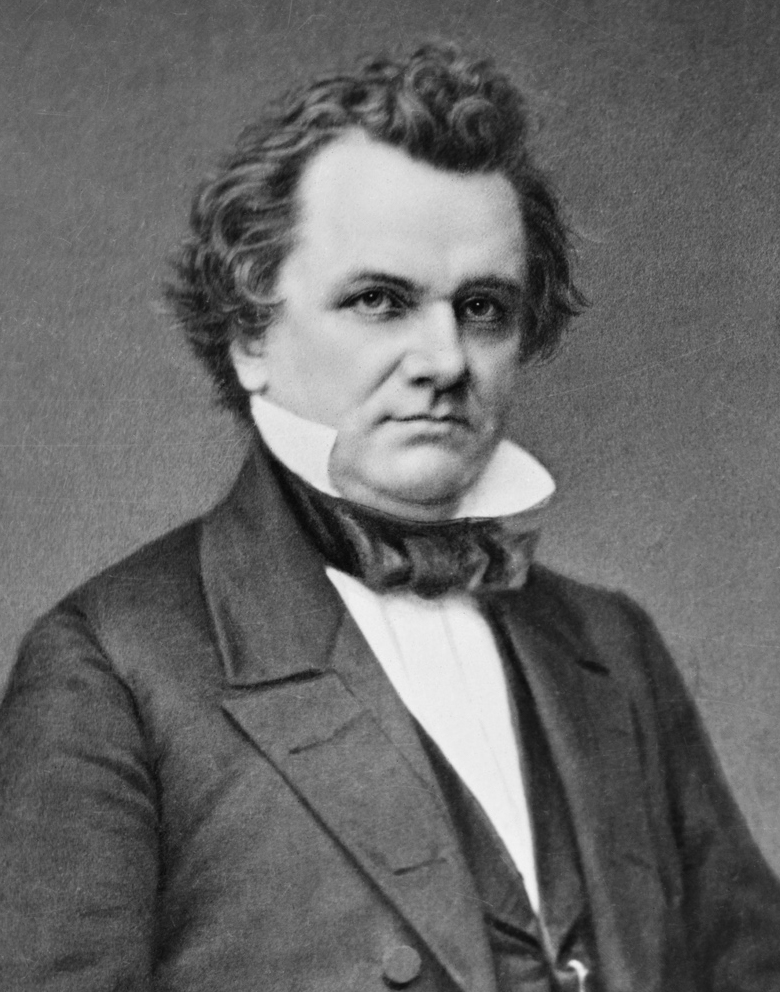
Senator Stephen A. Douglas of Illinois

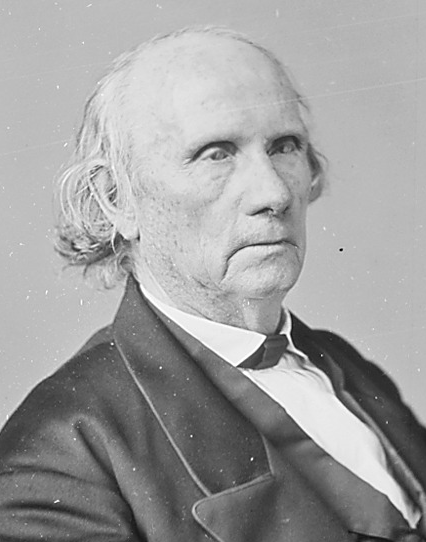
Former Secretary of the Treasury James Guthrie of Kentucky

==== Declined ====
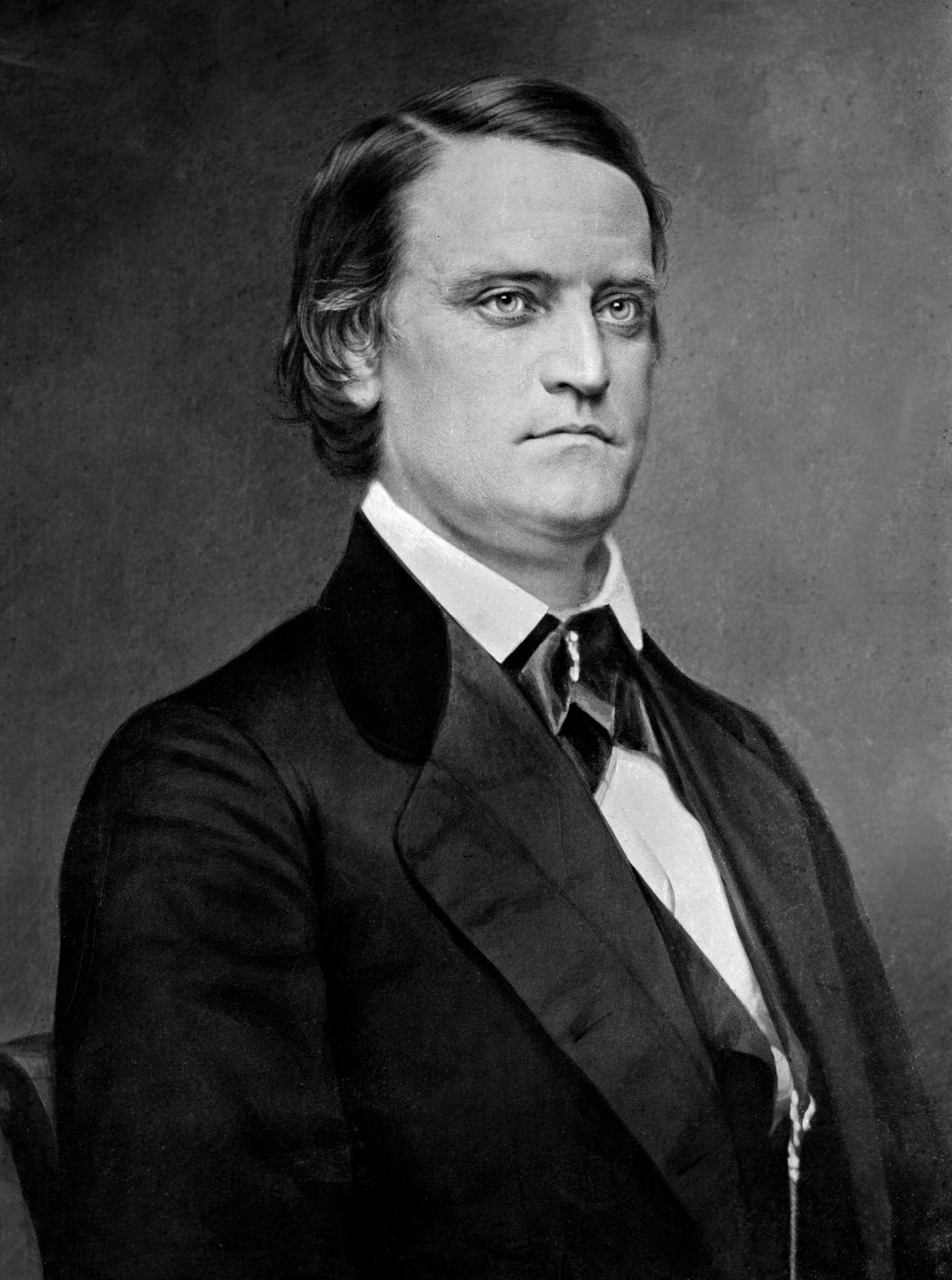
Vice President
John C. Breckinridge
of Kentucky

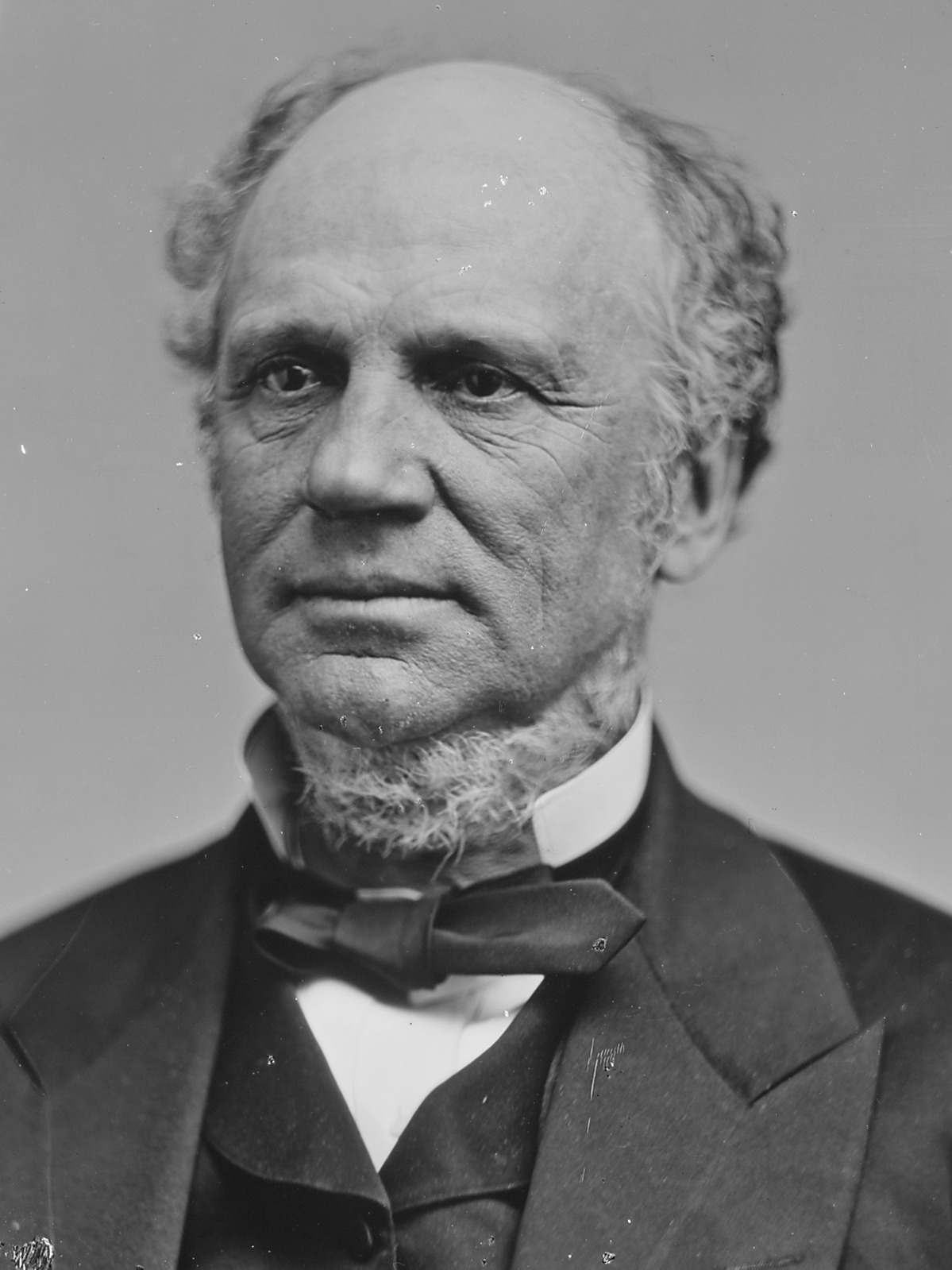
Former Governor Horatio Seymour of New York

Northern Democratic Presidential Ballot
	1st	2nd
Douglas	173.5	181.5
Guthrie	9	5.5
Breckinridge	5.5	7.5
Seymour	1	0
Bocock	1	0
Dickinson	0.5	0
Wise	0.5	0
Withdrawn / not voting	112	108.5

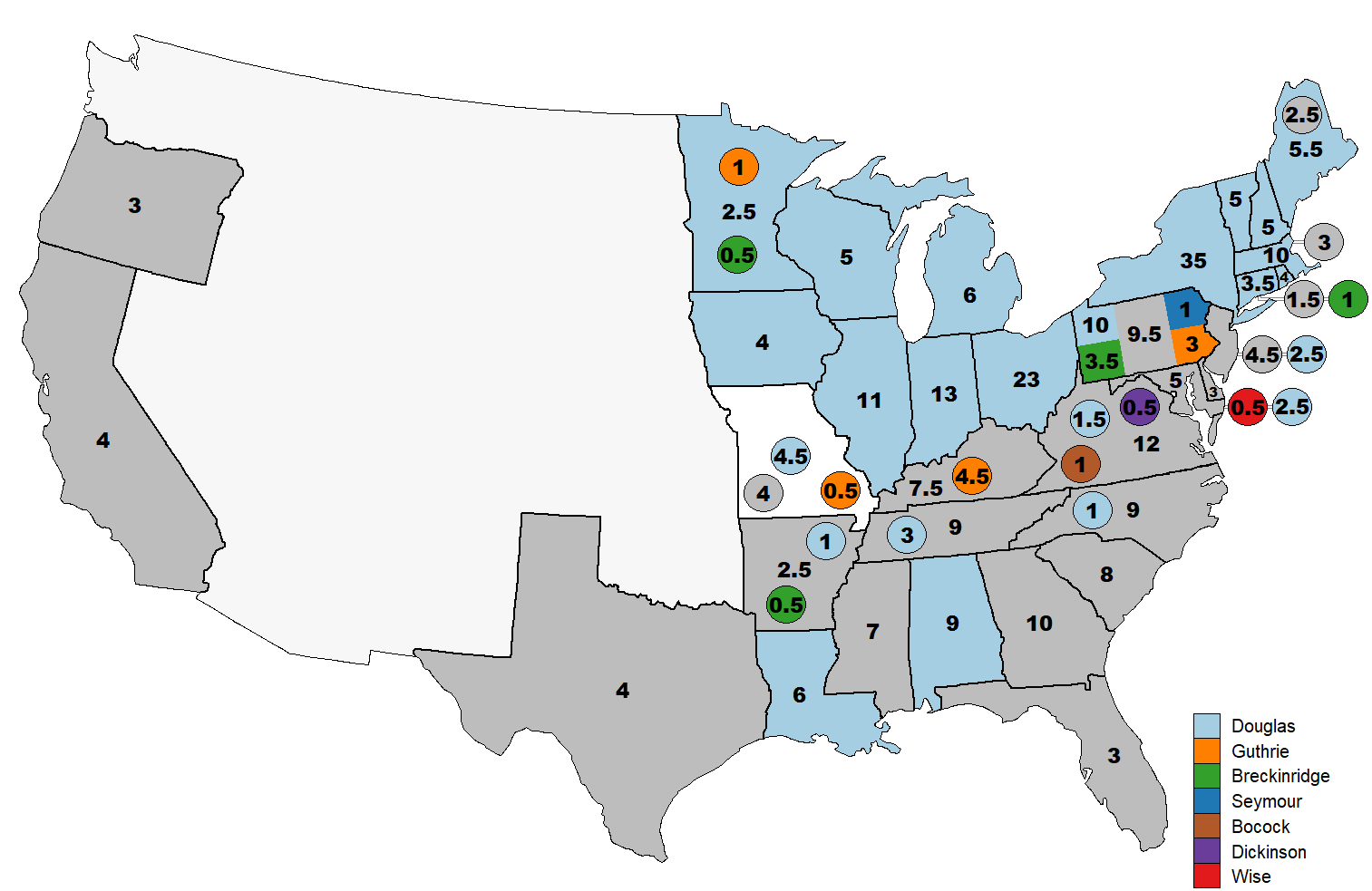
1st Ballot

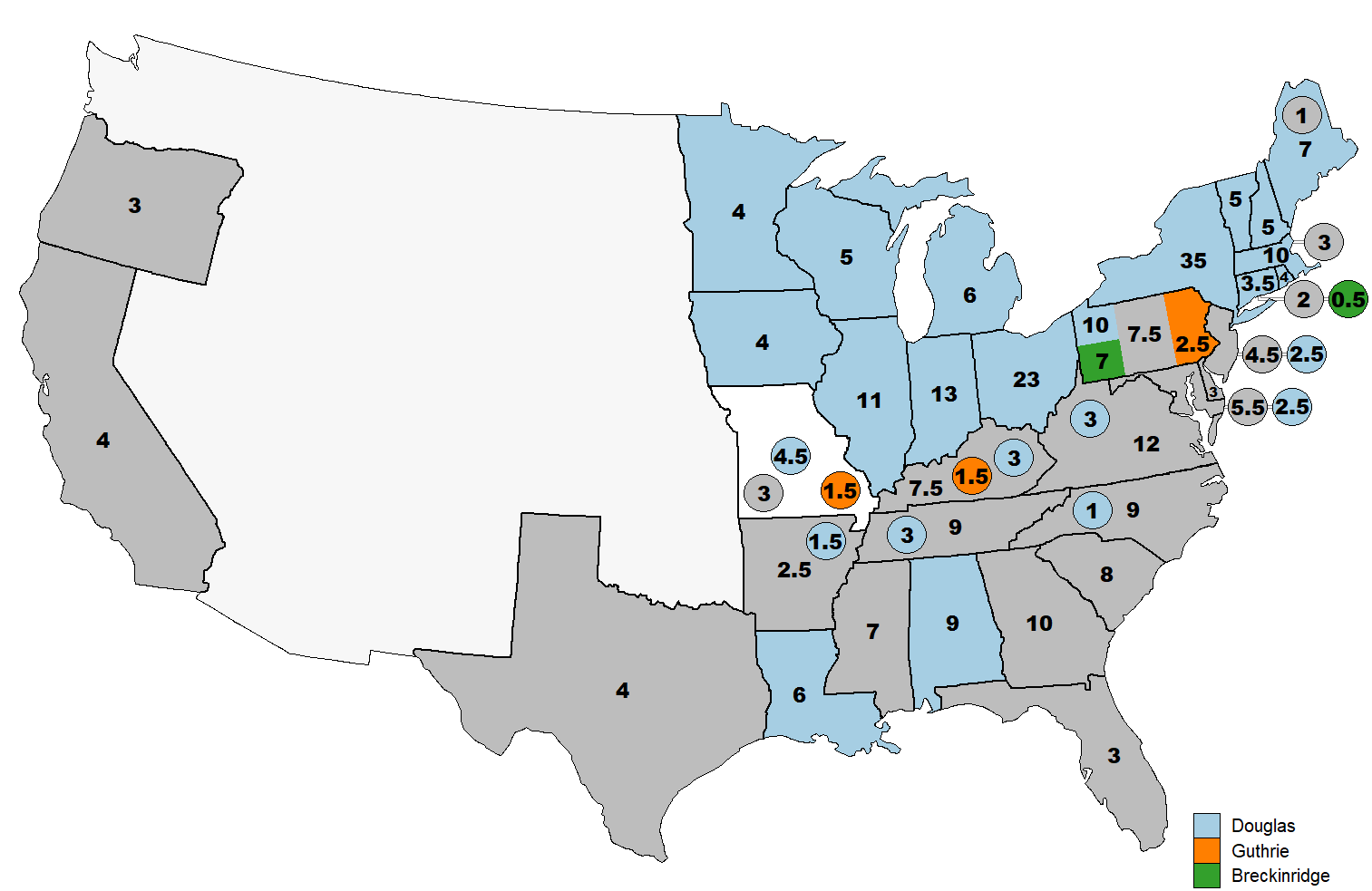
2nd Ballot

=== Vice-presidential balloting ===
Senator Benjamin Fitzpatrick of Alabama was the only candidate for the vice-presidential nomination.

During the call of the states, every vote recorded was in favor of Fitzpatrick with no exception until Pennsylvania was reached. One of Pennsylvania's votes was announced for former state senator William C. Alexander of New Jersey. Upon this announcement, a New Jersey delegate informed the delegates that he had been authorized before the convention, by Alexander himself, not to allow his name to be presented as a candidate. The Pennsylvanian who desired Alexander cast one blank vote thereafter.

==== Vice-presidential candidate ====
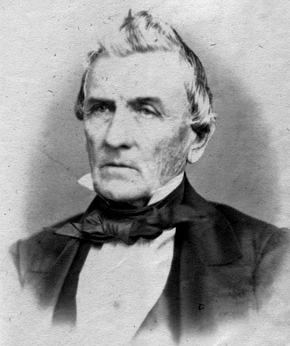
Senator Benjamin Fitzpatrick of Alabama

Northern Democratic Vice Presidential Ballot
	1st (Before Shift)	1st (After Shift)
Fitzpatrick	198.5	198.5
Alexander	1	0
Withdrawn / not voting	103.5	104.5

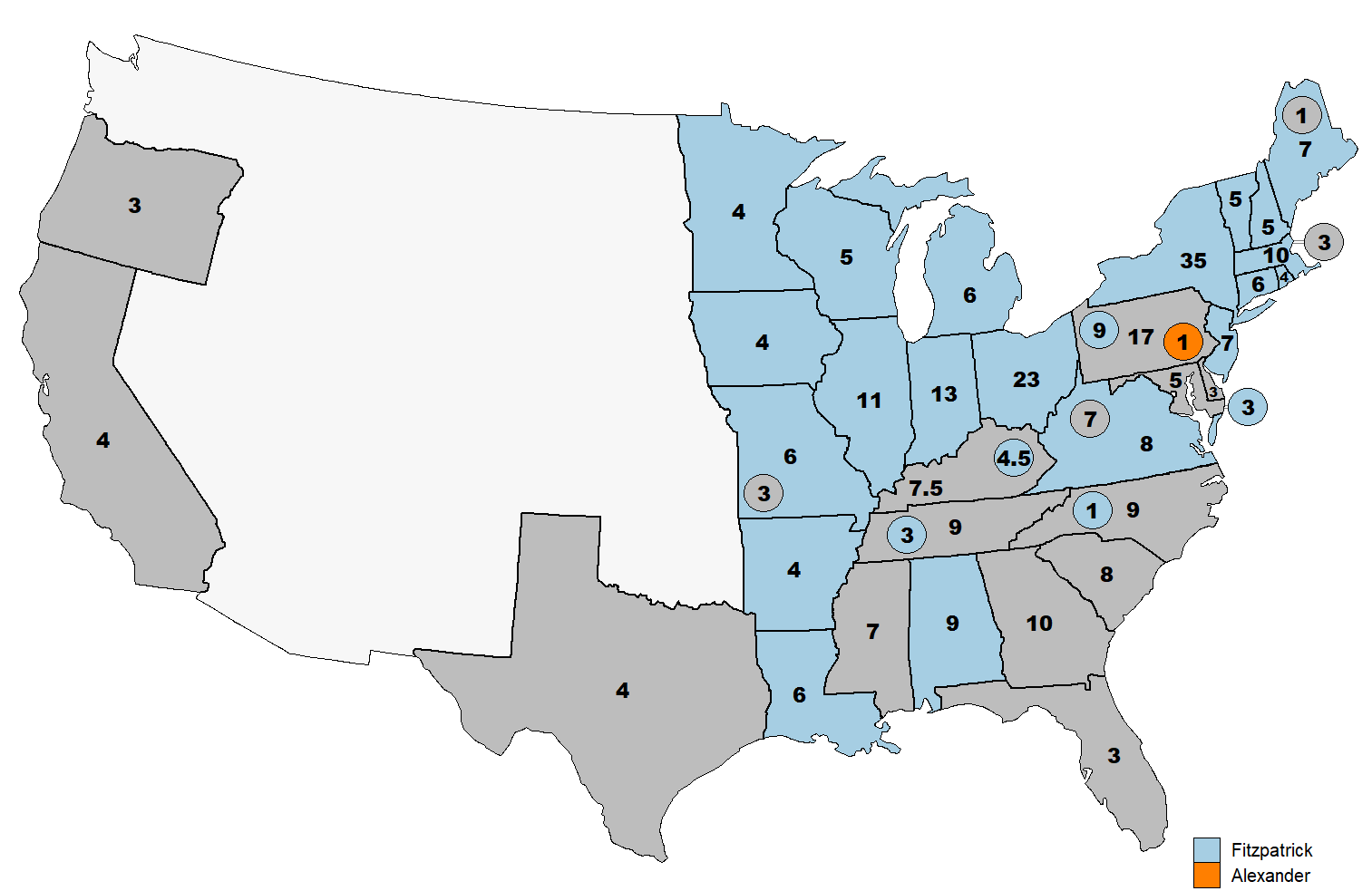
1st Ballot
(Before Shift)

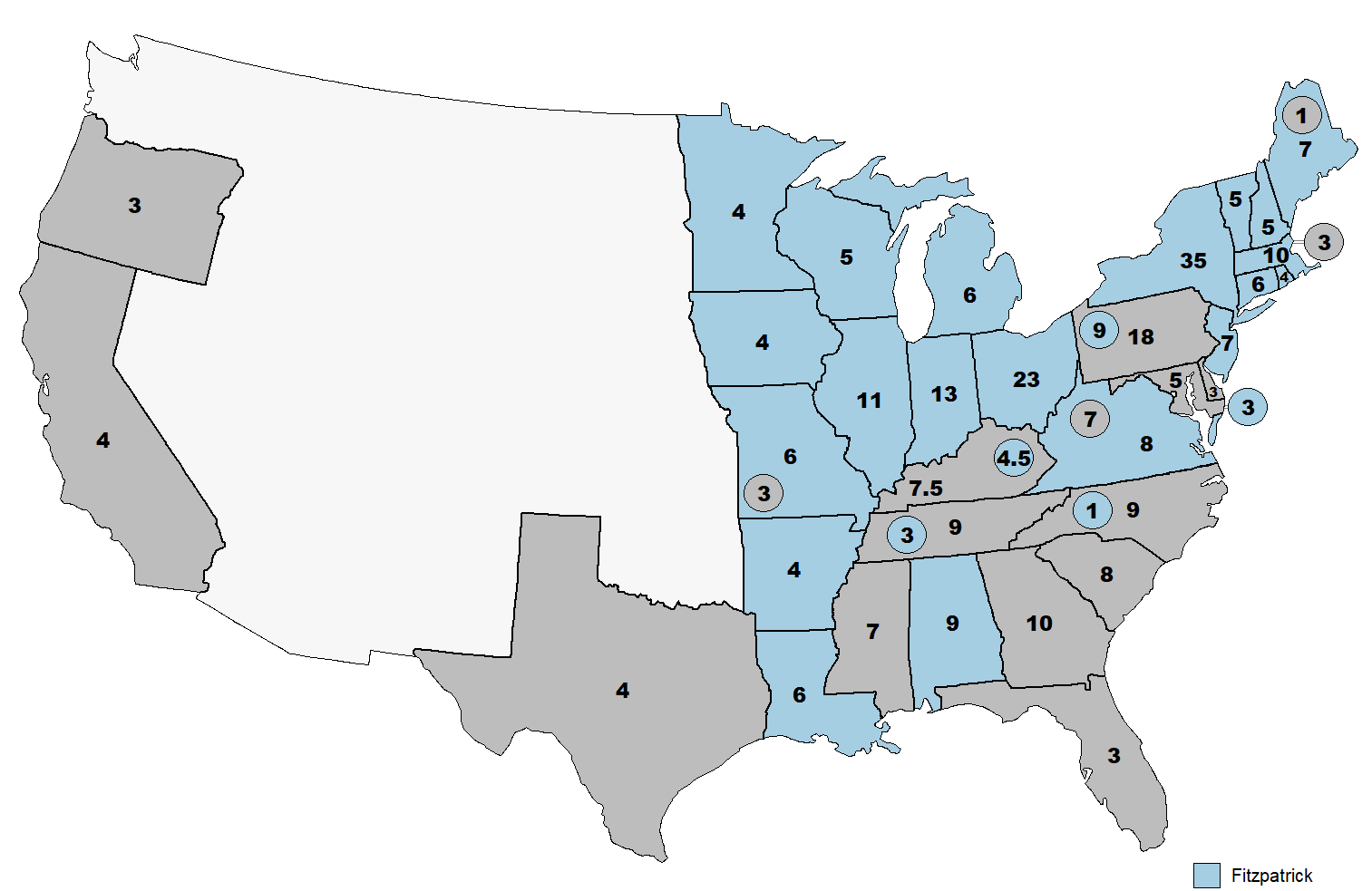
1st Ballot
(After Shift)

=== Vice-presidential replacement ===
After the unanimous nomination of Fitzpatrick as the candidate for vice president, the convention adjourned on June 23, the sixth and last day of its session. On the same day, but after the adjournment, Fitzpatrick declined the nomination. Fitzpatrick's refusal of the vice-presidential nomination occurred sixteen years after Silas Wright was the first to turndown the honor. In 1924, Frank Lowden would be the third and last person to date who refused their party's vice-presidential nomination.

==== Vice-presidential candidate ====
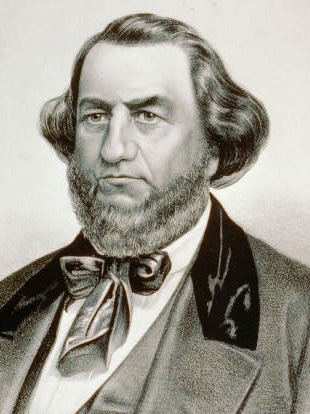
Former Governor Herschel V. Johnson of Georgia

Since the convention had already adjourned, the executive committee was required to name a replacement for Fitzpatrick.

On motion of Mr. Dick, the lone remaining delegate from North Carolina, the vice-presidential nomination was conferred on former Senator and Governor Herschel V. Johnson of Georgia by acclamation.

== Baltimore convention (Southern Democratic) ==
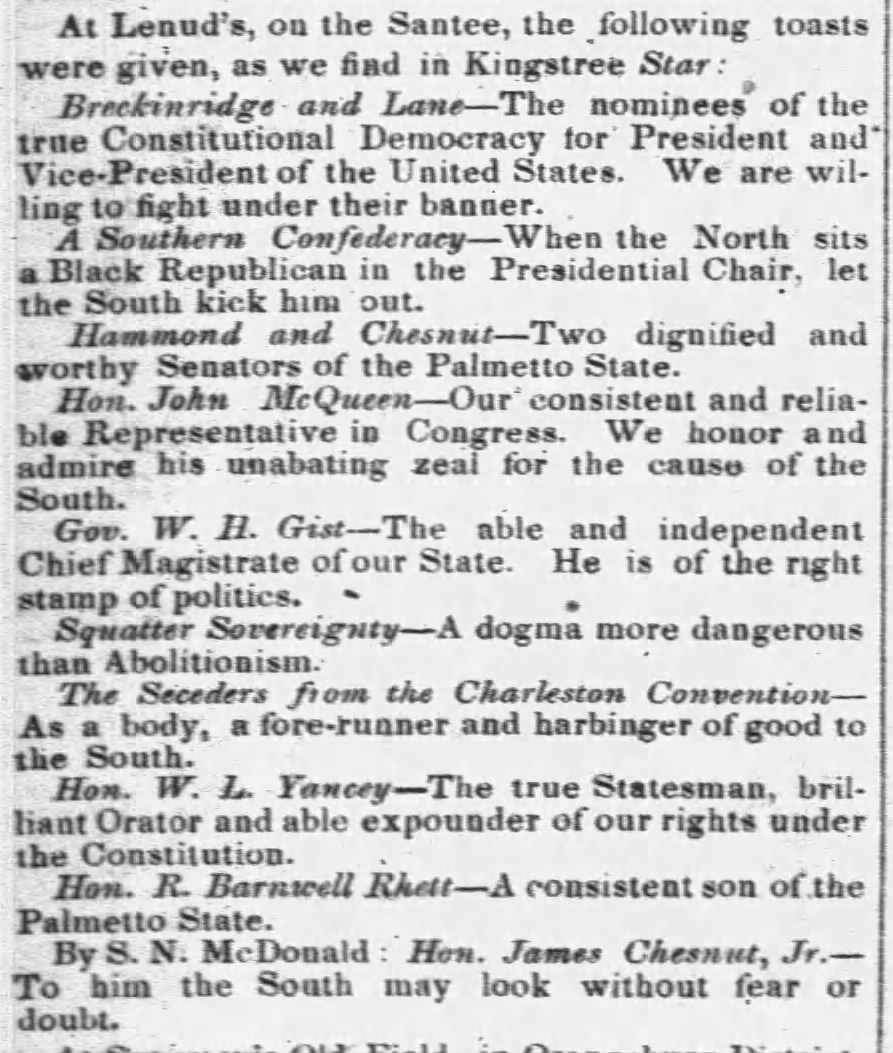
Toasts made in South Carolina on the Fourth of July 1860 include the language "Southern Confederacy," applaud the collapse of the Charleston convention, endorse the Breckinridge–Lane ticket, and deem Lincoln a "Black Republican" (Charleston Daily Courier, July 16, 1860)

A second convention assembled at Instituted Hall in Baltimore on June 23, 1860. It was composed chiefly of the delegates who had walked out of or boycotted the Northern Democratic convention.

One of their first acts was to abrogate the two-thirds rule, as had been done by the Douglas convention: both conventions acted under the same necessity, since there were insufficient delegates remaining to allow the preservation of this rule at either convention.

The majority resolutions, whose replacement by the minority report facilitated the collapse of the Charleston convention, were reported and adopted unanimously, amid great applause.

=== Presidential balloting ===
After the adoption of the majority resolutions, the convention proceeded to select their candidates. Four names were placed in nomination: Breckinridge, Dickinson, Hunter, and Lane.

==== Presidential candidates ====
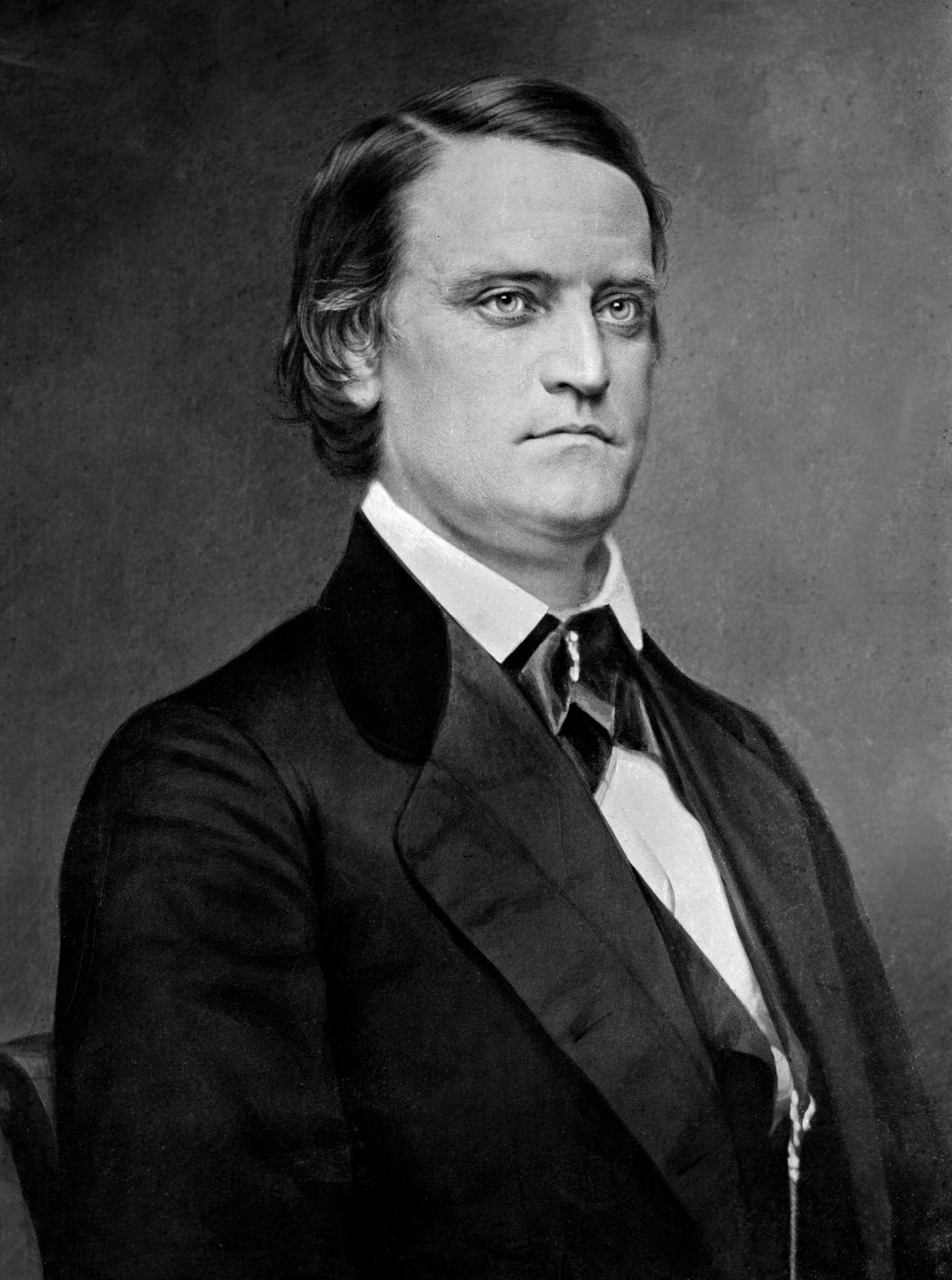
Vice President
John C. Breckinridge
of Kentucky

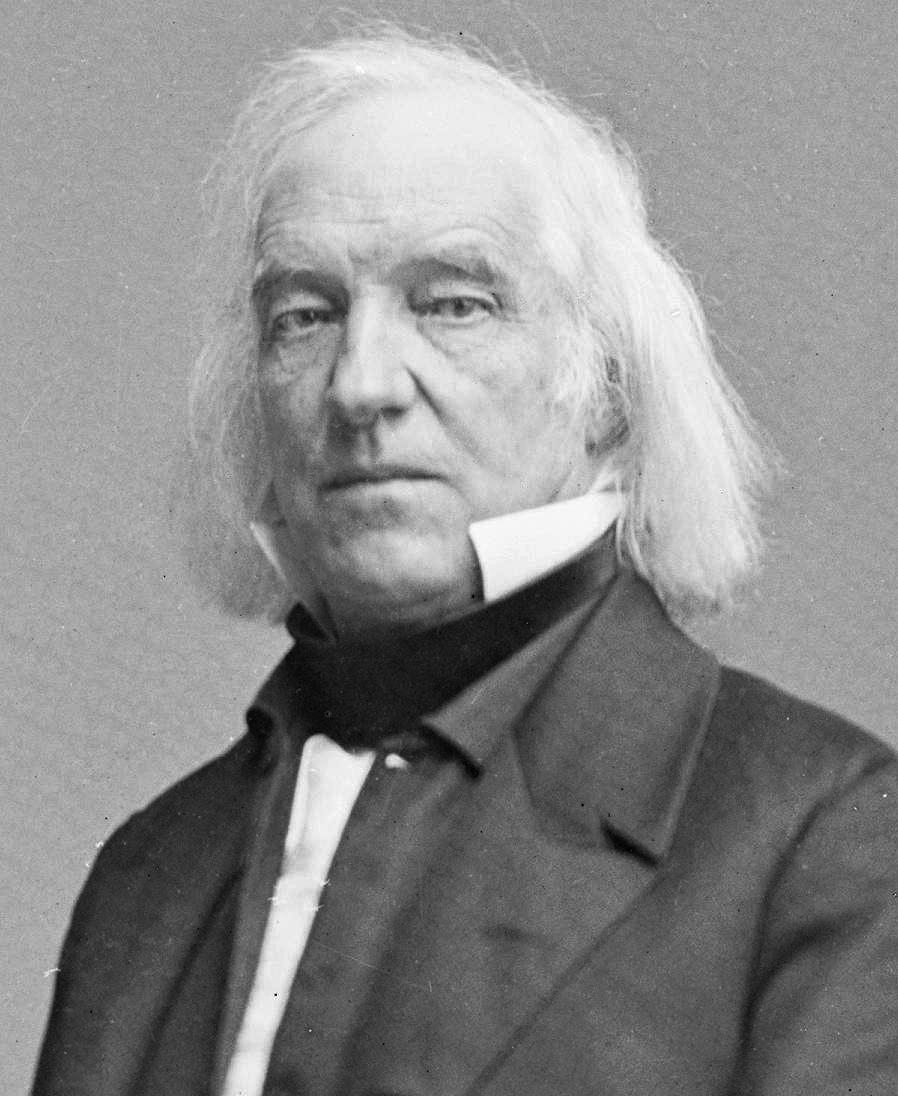
Former Senator
Daniel S. Dickinson
of New York

Senator
Robert M. T. Hunter
of Virginia
(withdrawn)

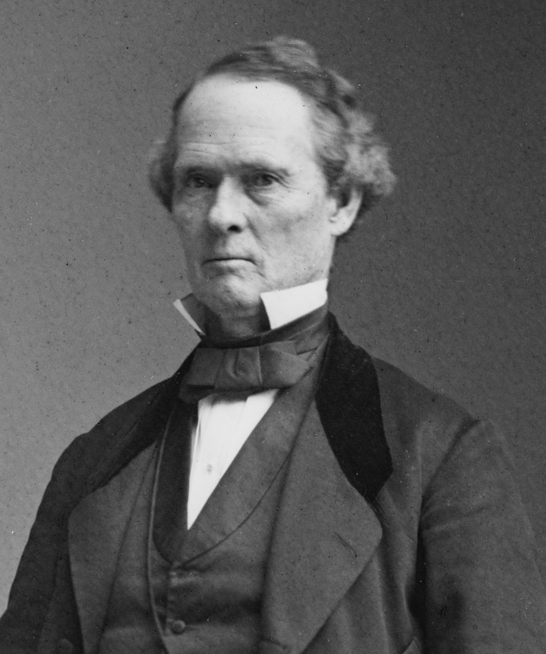
Senator
Joseph Lane
of Oregon
(withdrawn)

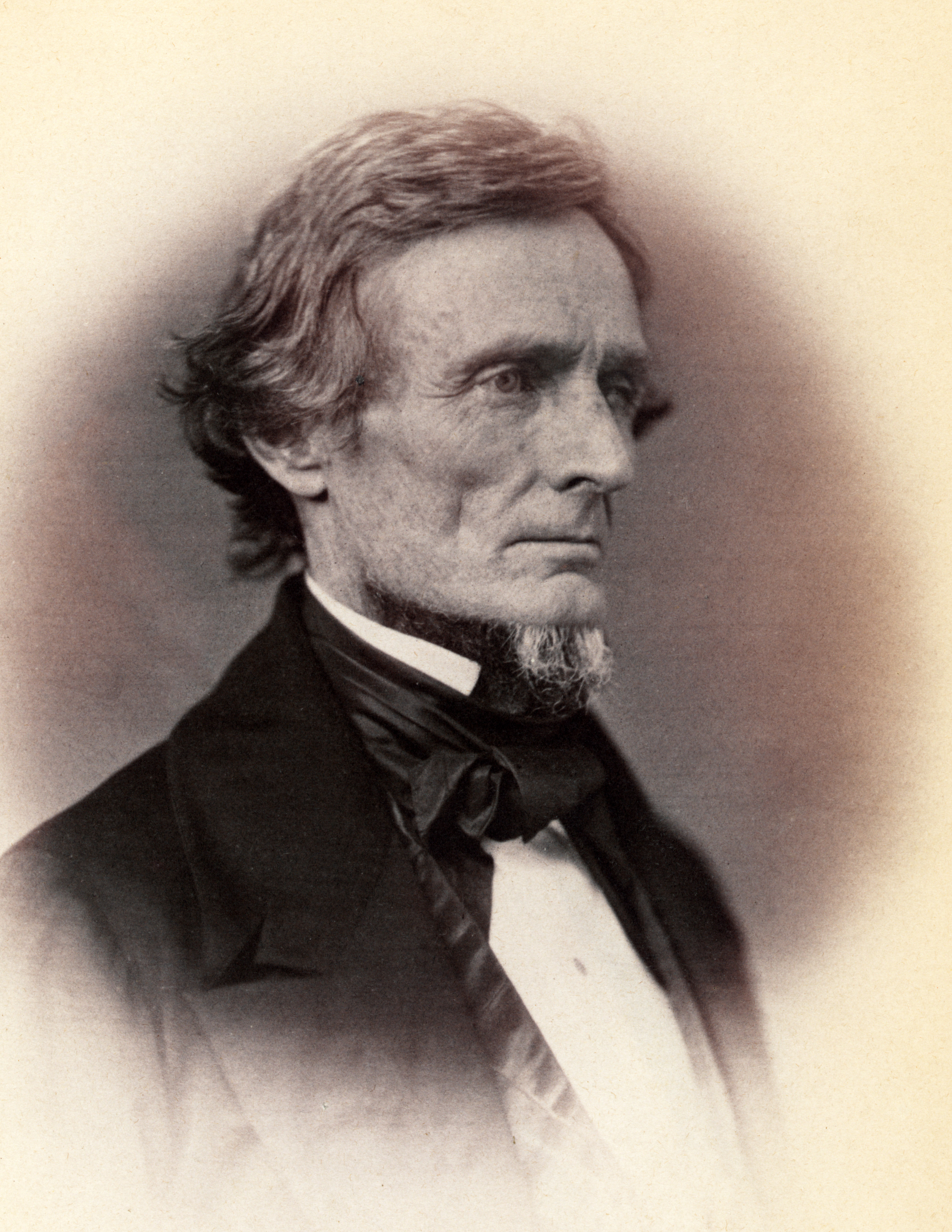
Senator
Jefferson Davis
of Mississippi
(declined consideration)

Despite instructions from their state convention, the Mississippi delegation, with Jefferson Davis' concurrence, desired that his name be removed from possible consideration for the sake of harmony. The names of Hunter and Lane were subsequently withdrawn in the spirit of harmony and unanimity. After New York cast an obligatory vote for Dickinson, Breckinridge was declared the unanimous choice of the convention for president.

Southern Democratic Presidential Ballot
	1st	Unanimous
Breckinridge	103.5	105.5
Dickinson	2	0
Unrepresented / Not Voting	197.5	197.5

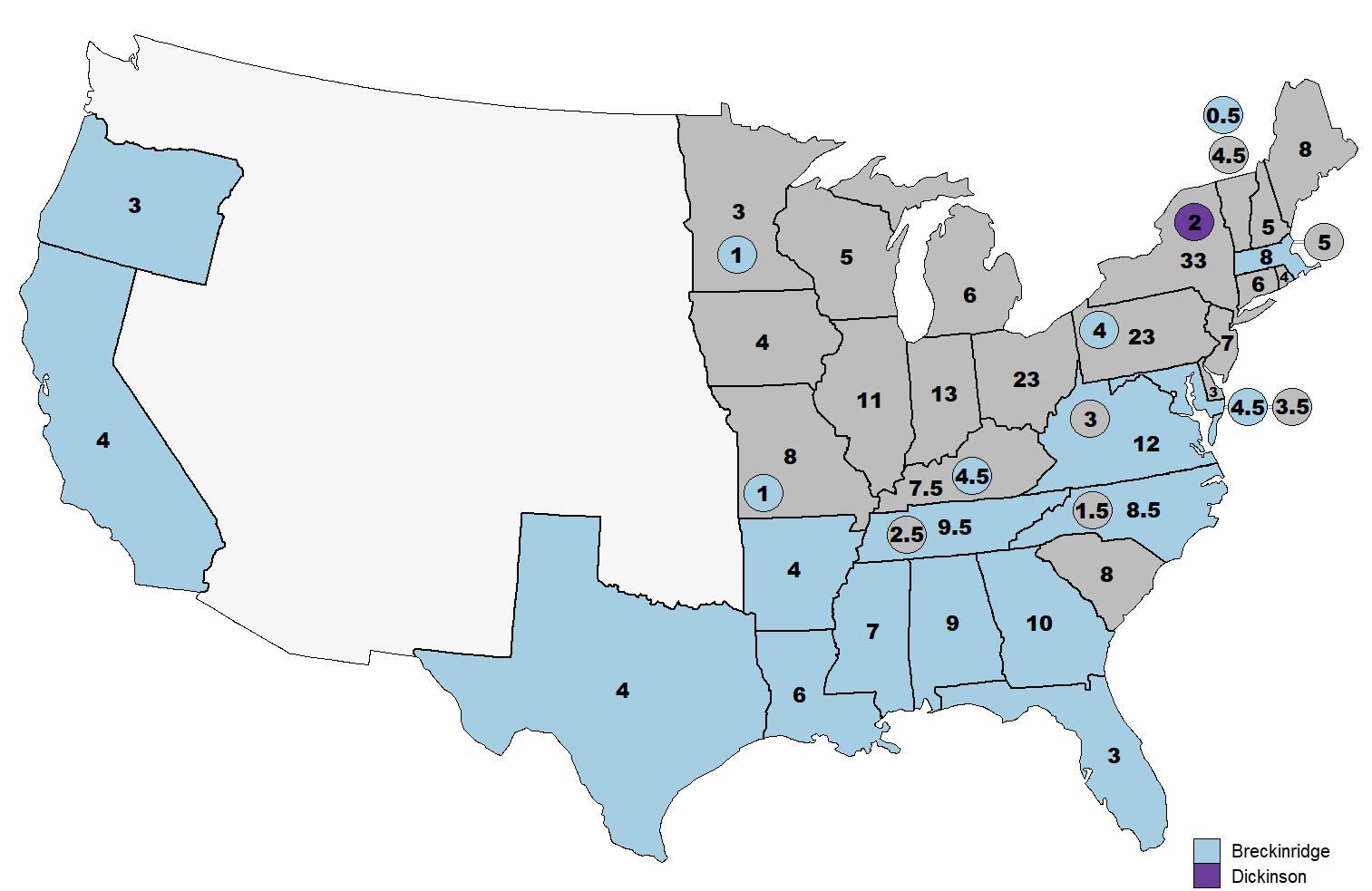
1st Ballot

=== Vice-presidential balloting ===
After the applause for Breckinridge's nomination had subsided, the whole hall resounded with cries for Yancey for Vice President. After Yancey got on his feet, but before he could speak, Lane's name was presented and seconded.

No other names being presented for the office, the states were called and voted unanimously for Lane.

==== Vice-presidential candidates ====
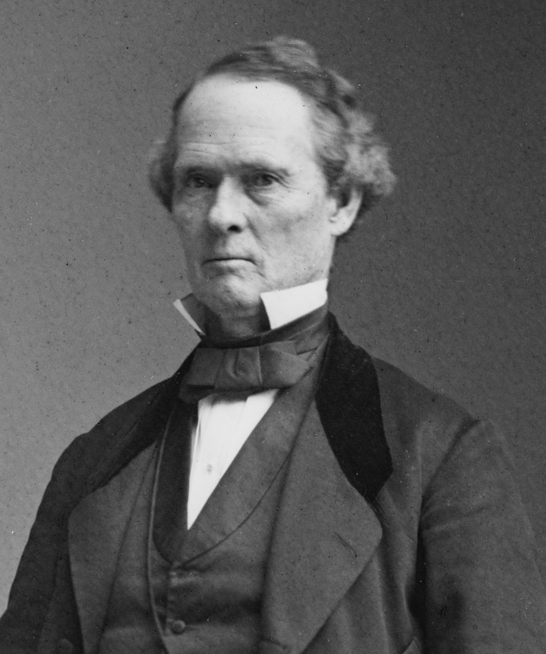
Senator
Joseph Lane
of Oregon

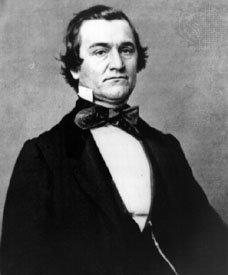
Former Representative
William L. Yancey
of Alabama
(Not Nominated)

Southern Democratic Vice Presidential Ballot
	1st
Lane	105.5
Unrepresented / Not Voting	197.5

After this, many delegates returned to Metropolitan Hall in Richmond so that those who had remained there could also vote. On June 26, the delegates present voted for Breckenridge and Lane, concurring with the convention at the Maryland Institute Hall.

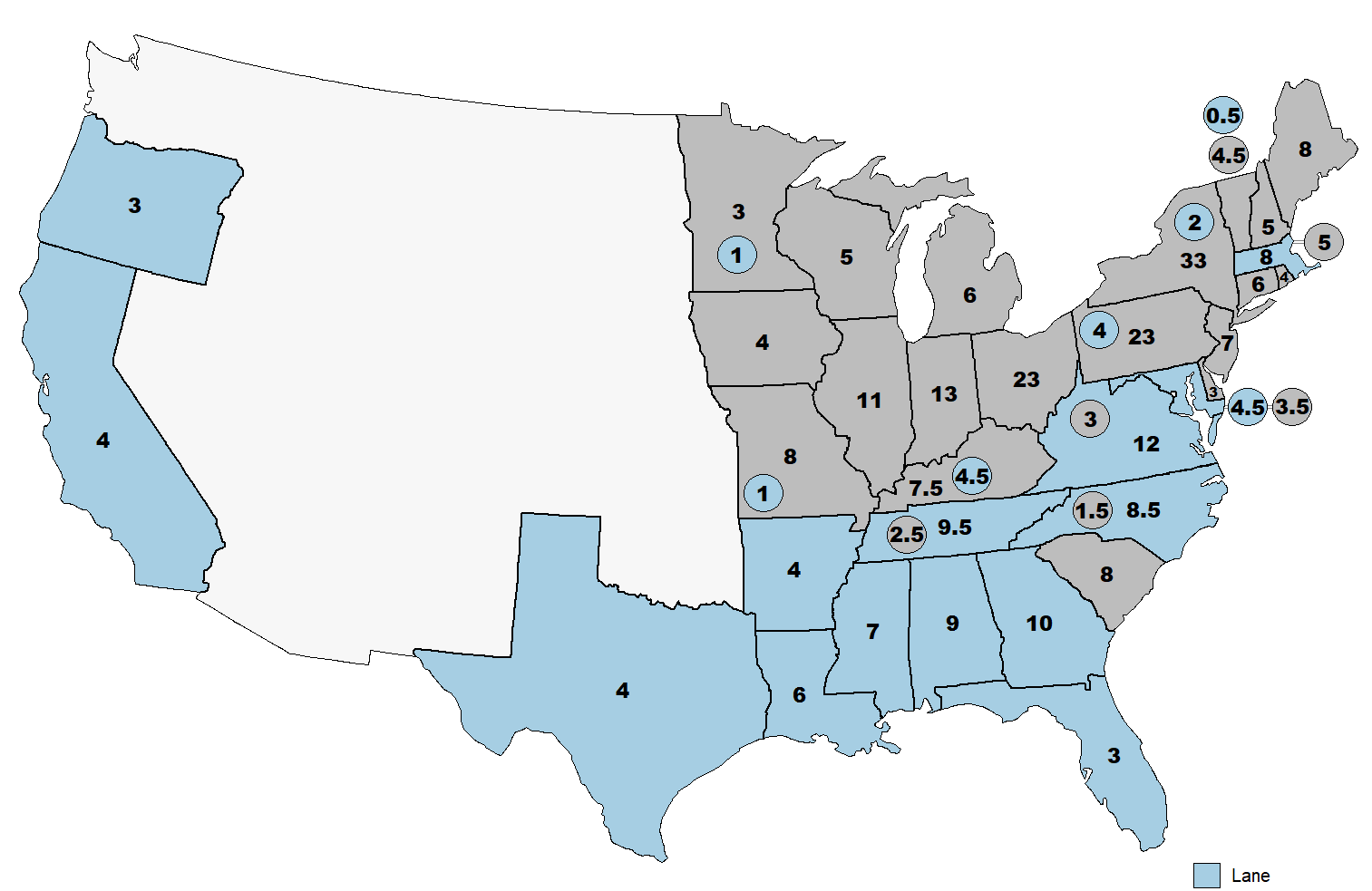
1st Ballot

== Consequences ==
After the break-up of the Charleston convention, many of those present stated that the Republicans were now certain to win the 1860 Presidential election.

In the general election, the actual division in Democratic popular votes did not directly affect any state outcomes except California, Oregon, Kentucky, Tennessee, and Virginia. Of these states, only California and Oregon were free states, and although both were carried by Republican nominee Abraham Lincoln they combined for only seven of Lincoln's 180 electoral votes. The latter three states were slave states that were carried by neither Douglas, Breckinridge nor Lincoln but by John Bell, nominee of the Constitutional Union Party. Composed mainly of former Whigs and Know-Nothings, the Constitutional Union Party attempted to ignore the slavery issue in favor of preserving the Union.

Even if California, Oregon and every state carried by Douglas, Breckinridge or Bell had been carried by a single presidential nominee, Lincoln would still have had a large majority of electoral votes. However, the split in the Democratic Party organization was a serious handicap in many states, especially Pennsylvania, and almost certainly reduced the aggregate Democratic popular vote. Pennsylvania's 27 electoral votes were especially decisive in ensuring a Republican victory – had Lincoln failed to carry that state combined with any other free state, he could not have obtained a majority of electoral votes, forcing a contingent election in the House of Representatives.

James M. McPherson suggested in Battle Cry of Freedom that the “Fire-eater” program of breaking up the convention and running a rival ticket was deliberately intended to bring about the election of a Republican as president, and thus trigger secession declarations by the slave-owning states. Whatever the “intent” of the fire-eaters may have been, doubtless many of them favored secession, and the logical, probable, and actual consequence of their actions was to fragment the Democratic party and thereby virtually ensure a Republican victory.

== See also ==
- History of the United States Democratic Party
- U.S. presidential nomination convention
- List of Democratic National Conventions
- 1860 Republican National Convention
- 1860 United States presidential election

== Notes ==
Preceded by 1856; Cincinnati, Ohio	Democratic National Conventions	Succeeded by 1864; Chicago, Illinois
