= Strother =

Strother may refer to:

== Surnames ==
- Ann Strother (born 1983), American basketball coach and former player
- Cynthia and Kay Strother, singing siblings known as the Bell Sisters
- Dean C. Strother (1908–2000), U.S. Air Force four-star general and commander-in-chief of NORAD
- David Hunter Strother (1816–1888), American magazine illustrator and writer
- Deon Strother (born 1972), American football player
- Dora Dougherty Strother (1921–2013), World War II pilot
- Emily Vielé Strother (1866–1959), American writer
- French Strother (1730-1800), American planter, politician, lawyer and judge
- George Strother (1783–1840), American politician and lawyer
- James F. Strother (1811–1860), American politician and lawyer, son of George Strother
- James F. Strother (West Virginia politician) (1868–1930), lawyer, judge, and U. S. Representative from West Virginia, grandson of James F. Strother
- Percy Strother (1946–2005), American electric blues guitarist, singer and songwriter
- Raymond Strother, American political consultant

== Given names ==
- Strother Martin (1919–1980), American actor
- Strother M. Stockslager (1842–1930), U.S. Representative from Indiana
- J Strother Moore, American computer scientist

== Places ==
- Strother, Missouri, an unincorporated community
- Town of Strother, original name of Lee's Summit, Missouri, a city
- Fort Strother, a stockade fort built in 1813 in the Mississippi Territory
- Strother Army Airfield, a World War II training base in Kansas
- Strother Creek, in Missouri
- Strother Field, a public airport that was formerly Strother Army Airfield

== See also ==
- Julian Strawther (born 2002), American basketball player
- Strothers, a surname
- Struthers (disambiguation)
