= Viele =

Viele or Vielé may refer to any one of the following:

== People ==
- Egbert Ludovicus Viele (1825–1902), civil engineer and US Representative from New York
- Francis Vielé-Griffin (1864–1937), American-born French poet
- John L. Viele (1788–1832), New York politician
- Justin Viele (born 1990), American baseball player
- Herman Knickerbocker Vielé (1855–1908), American writer
- Emily Vielé (1866–1959), better known as Emily Vielé Strother, American writer
- Teresa Griffin Vielé (1832–1906), American author and wife of Egbert Ludovicus Viele

== See also ==
- Vielle, a European bowed stringed instrument used in the Medieval period
- La Vieille, a lighthouse in France
