= Daniel F. Slaughter =

American politician (1799–1882)

Member of the Virginia Senate from the Culpeper and Fauquier Counties district
- In office December 1, 1828 – December 5, 1830
- Preceded by: John Thom
- Succeeded by: boundaries revised

Member of the Virginia Senate from the Culpeper, Madison, Rappahannock Counties and Orange Counties district
- In office December 3, 1832 – December 4, 1836
- Preceded by: Lawrence T. Dade
- Succeeded by: Extra Billy Smith

Personal details
- Born: Daniel French Slaughter; October 15, 1799 Slaughter Mountain, Culpeper County, Virginia
- Died: October 13, 1882 (aged 82) Culpeper County, Virginia
- Party: Whig
- Spouse(s): Leticia Madison; Mary Wallace Winston
- Children: Phillip Madison Slaughter, James E. Slaughter, John Slaughter, Daniel A. Slaughter, Mary Wallace Slaughter, Elizabeth French Slaughter, Caroline Winston Slaughter
- Education: College of William and Mary
- Occupation: doctor, politician, planter

Military service
- Branch/service: Virginia Militia

Daniel French Slaughter (October 15, 1799— October 13, 1882) was a Virginia planter and politician from two distinguished families of politicians and soldiers.

== Early and family life ==
The son of Capt. Philip Pendleton Slaughter and his wife, Margaret French Strother (daughter of French Strother), Slaughter was born into the First Families of Virginia, his grandfathers (uncles and cousins) having helped settle Culpeper County and fought in the American Revolutionary War. He was educated at a school at Cloverdale (in what had once been Capt. Philip Slaughter's Springfield farm), probably by classical scholar John Robertson, because by the time 1818, former Presbyterian church pastor Samuel Davies Hoge succeeded him in 1818, Daniel French Slaughter was attending the College of William and Mary in Williamsburg, Virginia.

Dr. Daniel Slaughter lived on Slaughter Mountain (also called "Cedar Mountain" particularly after the American Civil War) and married twice. He first married Letitia Madison, a niece of President James Madison, in 1825, and they had sons Phillip Madison Slaughter (who was a lawyer by 1850) and James Edwin Slaughter (1827-1901). In 1855 the widower married Mary Wallace Winston (1819-1897), granddaughter of revolutionary Capt. Thomas Wallace. They had three daughters Mary Wallace Slaughter (1856-1938), Elizabeth French Slaughter Wallace (1858-1952) and Caroline Winston Slaughter (1861-1948) as well as two sons: John Mercer Slaughter (1859-1914) and Daniel Alexander Slaughter (1863-1920), who would also serve in the Virginia House of Delegates.

== Career ==
Like his father, Capt. Philip Slaughter, Daniel Slaughter farmed using enslaved labor. In 1830 he owned 9 slaves and his father owned 17 slaves. In 1840, Daniel F. Slaughter owned 16 slaves, half of them employed in agriculture, When slave schedules were separated in 1850 (and occupations were listed on the main census form), farmer Daniel Slaughter owned 18 slaves, and a decade later he owned 24 slaves, 13 of them under 10 years old. During General Lafayette's farewell visit to the United States, Capt. Philip Slaughter introduced his daughter Anne Mercer Slaughter and son Daniel F. Slaughter to the Marquis in Philadelphia and again at the festivities in Culpeper and Orange. This may have been the son's political coming-out. Daniel Slaughter won election as a Whig to the Virginia Senate in 1828, initially representing Fauquier and Culpeper Counties and succeeding John Thom, who had represented them in the senate since 1820. In the redistricting following the Virginia Constitutional Convention of 1829-1830, Fauquier County was paired with Prince William County and would be represented by long-term senator Charles Hunton, and Slaughter's native Culpeper County was paired with Madison and Orange Counties, long represented by General Lawrence T. Dade a lawyer in Orange, Virginia. When Dade moved to Owensboro, Kentucky, Daniel Slaughter won that senate seat in 1832, and with the creation of Rappahannock County from them, it was added in 1834. However, Extra Billy Smith, future Virginia governor and Confederate general, replaced him in 1836. In 1841, Slaughter ran for a seat in the U.S. House of Representatives, but lost. From November 30, 1855, until 1867, Slaughter was also the postmaster for Criglersville, Madison County, Virginia, as his grandson of the same name would be from 1891 to 1930.

During the American Civil War, his VMI-educated eldest son, James E. Slaughter, relinquished his U.S. Army commission and volunteered to fight in the Confederate States Army. However, the younger Slaughter fought not in the Northern Virginia Campaign but further south, and rose to the rank of Brigadier General, but at the war's end fled to Mexico and never returned to reside in Virginia, nor did he ever marry as did his siblings and half-siblings. The Battle of Cedar Mountain was partially fought on Slaughter's lands (resulting in a Confederate victory on August 9, 1862), as would be skirmishes during the following fortnight. Part of the Battle of Brandy Station (the largest cavalry engagement of the war, but inconclusive, on June 9, 1863) was also fought on Slaughter lands, as would be skirmishes before the Battle of Culpeper Court House returned the area to Union control in September 1863, although much fighting would continue into 1864. This led to considerable devastation. One nearby pasture at once was called "Raccoon's Ford" on the Rapidan River below Slaughter's Mountain (owned by merchant Philip Pendleton Nalle and later by U.S. Representative Jeremiah Morton was so disrupted by cannon fire that locals called it "cannon ball field". After the Civil War, Daniel F. Slaughter became one of the directors of the Orange and Alexandria Railroad alongside his longtime ally John Barbour as well as the Culpeper Savings Bank and Insurance Company, licensed in 1867, alongside Barbour, Jacob S. Eggborn, Walter O'Bannon, Charles Crittenden, Charles Wiate and Lewis P. Nelson. However, the Bank failed to survive the Panic of 1873, which also caused the railroad's reorganization.

== Death and legacy ==
Slaughter died in 1882, survived by his widow, as well as several children and grandchildren. Many members of the family—including his son Daniel Alexander Slaughter, who served in the Virginia House of Delegates (1904-1906)--are buried at the Mitchells Presbyterian Church cemetery in Mitchells in Culpeper County.
