= James F. Strother =

American politician (1811–1860)

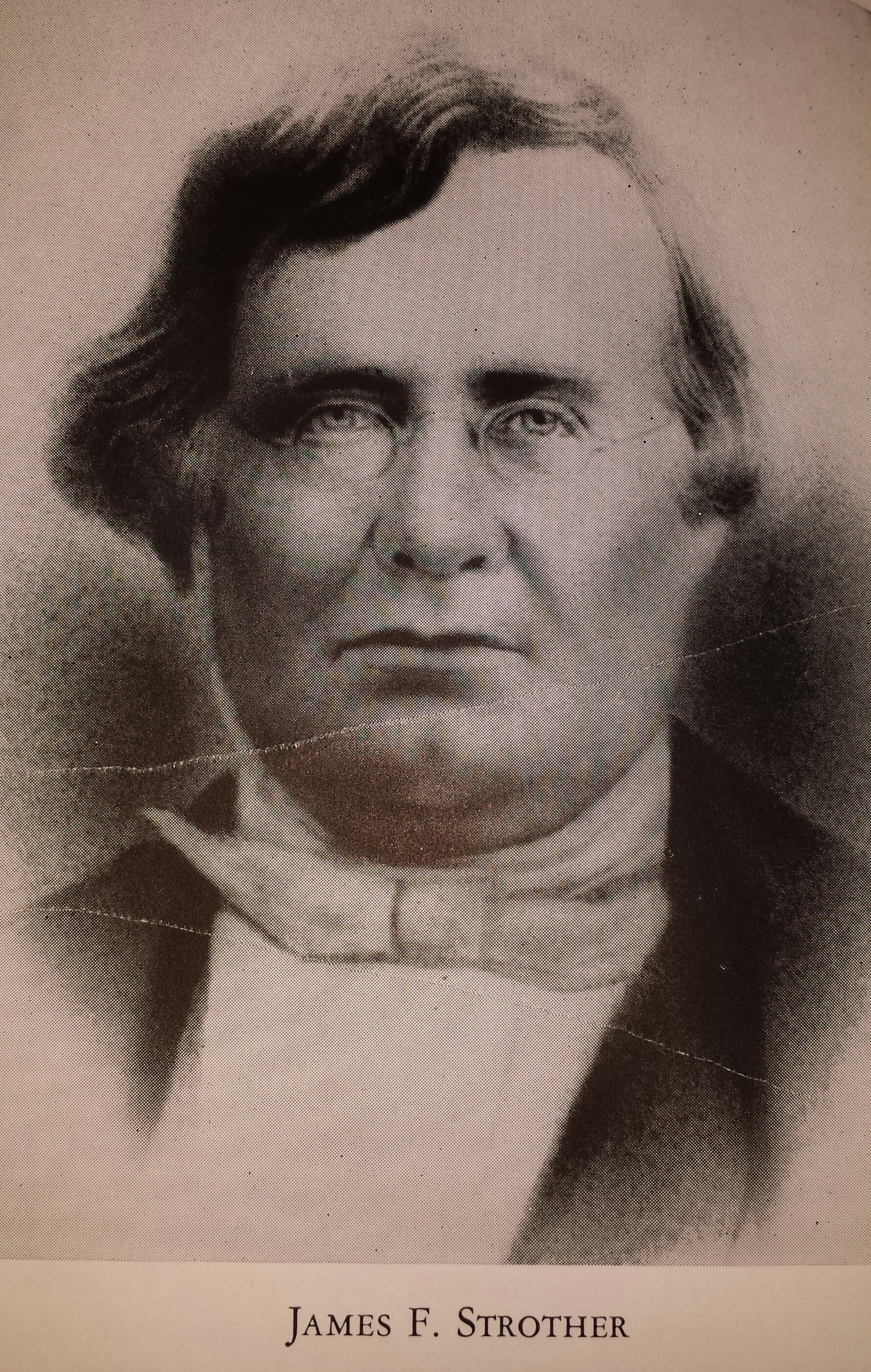
- Strother (c. 1853)

Member of the U.S. House of Representatives from Virginia's 9th district
- In office March 4, 1851 – March 3, 1853
- Preceded by: Jeremiah Morton
- Succeeded by: John Letcher

23rd Speaker of the Virginia House of Delegates
- In office 1847–1848
- Preceded by: John W. Jones
- Succeeded by: Harry L. Hopkins

Member of the Virginia House of Delegates from the Rappahannock County district
- In office December 1, 1840 – January 11, 1852
- Preceded by: William Walden
- Succeeded by: John H. Morrison

Personal details
- Born: James French Strother; September 4, 1811 Culpeper County, Virginia, US
- Died: September 20, 1860 (aged 49) Culpeper, Virginia, US
- Resting place: Masonic Cemetery, Culpeper, Culpeper County, Virginia
- Party: Whig
- Spouse: Elizabeth Richardson
- Children: 10, including John and Philip
- Parent: George Strother (father)
- Education: St. Louis University
- Occupation: Lawyer; farmer; politician

James French Strother (September 4, 1811 – September 20, 1860) was a nineteenth-century American politician and lawyer from a Virginia political family of lawyers, military officers and judges. He was the grandson of French Strother who served in the Continental Congress and both houses of the Virginia General Assembly, son of Congressman George Strother and grandfather of Congressman James F. Strother (West Virginia politician).

== Early and family life ==
Born in Culpeper County, Virginia to lawyer George F. Strother and his wife, the former Sarah Green Williams, Strother's ancestors were of the First Families of Virginia. His grandfather French Strother had served in the Continental Congress then represented Culpeper County for decades in both houses of the Virginia General Assembly. His father had served in the Virginia House of Delegates and the U.S. House of Representatives before moving to Missouri with his family and slaves after voting for the Missouri Compromise of 1820. Thus, James F. Strother received a private education in Virginia and Missouri, and attended St. Louis University in St. Louis, Missouri before reading law.

He married Elizabeth Richardson, who would bear seven sons and a daughter who survived to adulthood: George French Strother (1834-1877), John R. Strother (1837-after 1850), Lt. and Judge Philip Williams Strother (1839-1922), Judge James French Strother (1841-1927), Sgt. William Henry Strother (1843-1862), John Hunt Strother (1845-1862), Dr. William Johnson Strother (1849-1942), Maj. Lewis Harvie Strother (1855-1908), and Sarah Williams Strother (1854-1932).

== Career ==
Strother returned to Virginia and was admitted to the bar, as had generations of family members before him. Strother began his legal practice in Washington, Virginia in Rappahannock County on the eastern slopes of the Blue Ridge Mountains. As Strother's wealth grew, directly and by inheritance, he may have invested in land and enslaved labor. In 1840, he owned 4 slaves, in addition to his household of 7 white people (5 of them children), However, he does not show in slave schedules for Rappahannock County in 1850 nor 1860, and Virginia state slave censuses are not available online.

In 1840, Strother won election to the Virginia House of Delegates where he represented Rappahannock County, Virginia and won reelection many times, serving until 1851. When the Whig party gained control of the House of Delegates in 1847, he became Speaker of the House, but his party lost its majority in 1848 and remained the minority party the remainder of his life. Strother was also a delegate to the Virginia Constitutional Convention of 1850 (representing Fauquier and Rappahannock counties alongside fellow lawyer Robert E. Scott and Samuel Chilton).

Voters of Virginia's 9th congressional district nonetheless elected Strother as a Whig to the United States House of Representatives in 1850. He defeated fellow Whig Jeremiah Morton and served from 1851 to 1853. However, Democrat (and future Virginia governor) John Letcher foiled his re-election bid.

== Death and legacy ==
Afterward, Strother resumed his legal practice in Culpeper, Virginia until his death near there on September 20, 1860. He was interred in Masonic Cemetery. Within a year, the American Civil War had begun destroying the area. His cousin James E. Slaughter would become a Confederate Brigadier General, and some of his sons also volunteered to fight for the Confederate States of America. Philip Williams Strother served as a lieutenant, William Henry Strother a sergeant and George F. Strother an assistant commissary officer—all survived the conflict. William Henry Strother died of disease in 1862. Union forces began controlling the Rappahannock/Rapidan area after the Battle of Culpeper Court House in September 1863, and what had been Strother's district would become devastated before Major General Robert E. Lee took his last survey from atop Clark Mountain on May 4, 1864.

Nonetheless, the family (and its political tradition survived). His son Philip Williams Strother became a Virginia judge in Pearisburg, and his son (named James F. Strother after his grandfather) would become a lawyer and congressman from West Virginia. This James French Strother's son of the same name would become a Virginia Circuit judge in his native Rappahannock County.

Political offices
Preceded by John W. Jones	Speaker of the Virginia House of Delegates; 1847–1848	Succeeded by Henry L. Hopkins
U.S. House of Representatives
Preceded by Jeremiah Morton	Member of the U.S. House of Representatives from Virginia's 9th congressional district March 4, 1851 – March 3, 1853	Succeeded by John Letcher
