= Alexander Crockett =

Alexander Crockett may refer to:

- Alex Crockett (born 1981), English former rugby player
- Alexander G. Crockett (1862–1919), American politician
