= Senator Slaughter =

Senator Slaughter may refer to:

- Daniel F. Slaughter (1799–1882), Virginia State Senate
- Gabriel Slaughter (1767–1830), Kentucky State Senate
