= Daniel Slaughter =

Daniel Slaughter may refer to:

- D. French Slaughter Jr. (1925–1998), member of the United States House of Representatives
- Daniel F. Slaughter (1799–1882), Virginia planter and politician
