= Herman Knickerbocker Vielé =

American poet

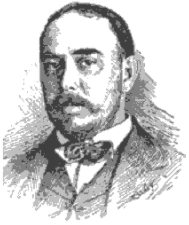
- Born: January 31, 1856; New York, New York
- Died: December 14, 1908 (aged 52); New York, New York
- Occupation: Writer
- Spouse: Mary Wharton (m. 1887)
- Parents: Egbert Ludovicus Viele (father); Teresa (Griffin) Viele (mother)
- Relatives: Francis Vielé-Griffin (brother); Emily Vielé Strother (sister)

Herman Knickerbocker Vielé (January 31, 1856 – December 14, 1908), was an American novelist, short story writer, and poet.

== Biography ==
Herman Knickerbocker Vielé was born in New York City on January 31, 1856, the son of Teresa (Griffin) Viele (author of a memoir of army life, Following the Drum) and Egbert Ludovicus Viele, a Union Army officer and later U.S. Representative from New York. His paternal grandfather John L. Viele was a New York politician, and his brother Francis Vielé-Griffin and sister Emily Vielé Strother were both writers. He married Mary Wharton on September 1, 1887.

The writer Thomas Allibone Janvier considered his first book, The Inn of the Silver Moon, his best work. In his second novel, The Last of the Knickerbockers (1901), Vielé — himself a descendant of the Knickerbockers of Schagticoke, New York — celebrated and mythologized the Dutch-descended families of New York, especially the idea that they represented a kind of surviving "old stock" that was nobler than other more recently arrived Americans.

His last book, a story collection entitled On the Lightship, was published posthumously. Among the ten stories, "The Girl from Mercury: An Interplanetary Love Story" stands out as a piece of early science fiction. Vielé introduced it thus: "Being the interpretation of certain phonic vibragraphs recorded by the Long’s Peak Wireless Installation, now for the first time made public through the courtesy of Professor Caducious, Ph.D., sometime secretary of the Boulder branch of the association for the advancement of interplanetary communication."

His books were popular in Europe, and Heartbreak Hill (1908) was translated into German.

Herman Knickerbocker Vielé died from heart disease in New York on December 14, 1908. One critic wrote that his death "robbed America not only of one of her most brilliant novelists, but of a poet of fine flavour".

== Books ==
- The Inn of the Silver Moon (novel, 1901)
- The Last of the Knickerbockers: A Comedy Romance (novel, 1901)
- Myra of the Pines (novel, 1902)
- Random Verse (poems, 1903)
- Heartbreak Hill: A Comedy Romance (novel, 1908)
- On the Lightship (story collection, 1909)
