= Philip Pendleton Nalle =

American businessman, farmer, and politician (1816–1907)

- Born: May 27, 1816; Stevensburg, Virginia, U.S.
- Died: November 17, 1907 (aged 91); Greenville Estate, Culpeper, Virginia, U.S.
- Known for: Justice of the Peace of Culpeper County; Postmaster
- Political party: Democratic
- Spouse: Elizabeth Wallace (m. 1843)
- Children: 6
- Relatives: Thomas Barbour (grandfather); Philip P. Barbour (uncle); James Barbour (uncle)

Philip Pendleton "P.P." Nalle (May 27, 1816 – November 17, 1907) was a businessman, farmer, and politician in 19th-century Virginia.

== Early life and family ==
Born on May 27, 1816, in Stevensburg, Virginia, he was the son of Martin Nalle and Eleanor Madison Barbour Nalle, and grandson of Virginia burgess Thomas Barbour. He was named for his uncle, Philip Pendleton Barbour, and he was also the nephew of Virginia governor James Barbour.

Nalle married Elizabeth Wallace in 1843, and together they had several children, including Gustavus Brown "G.B." Wallace Nalle and William Nalle, who served as adjutant general of Virginia.

== Adulthood ==
By the mid 1840s, Nalle was engaged in business and served as the postmaster for Racoon Ford in Culpeper County, a role he held for several decades.

In 1854, Nalle moved to the newly built Greenville estate which was designed for him by Jeremiah Morton. Nalle was a prominent businessman and farmer in Virginia, and operated a thriving mercantile in the Raccoon Ford area of Culpeper County. Nalle owned over one hundred cattle and operated 388 acres of farmland at his estate.

He also served as a founder, trustee, and senior warden of St. Paul's Church, Ridley Parish. Beginning in the 1850s, he served as a deputy to the diocesan council of the Episcopal Church in Virginia. Nalle served for many years as a justice of the peace in Culpeper County, and was a member of the Magistrates' Court of Culpeper County. In 1856, the Virginia General Assembly appointed Nalle as a corporate officer of the newly formed Brandy Station Turnpike Company. Nalle was an elected delegate to the 1859 Whig Convention.

In the 1880s, Nalle was elected as a Democratic delegate representing Culpeper County. He was also a delegate to the Episcopal council held in Fredericksburg for several years, serving from 1846 to his death, including a term as treasurer.

Nalle was a slaveowner and one of the individuals his family enslaved, Charles Nalle, escaped to freedom with the help of the Underground Railroad and Harriet Tubman.

== Death ==
Nalle died on November 17, 1907, and is interred at Rose Hill.

== In popular culture ==
Nalle is a character referenced in Dennis Danvers' 1994 historical fantasy novel Time and Time Again.

Letters that Nalle wrote to his son during the American Civil War are in the permanent collection of the Virginia Military Institute.
