= A. Pendleton Strother =

American politician (1872–1946)

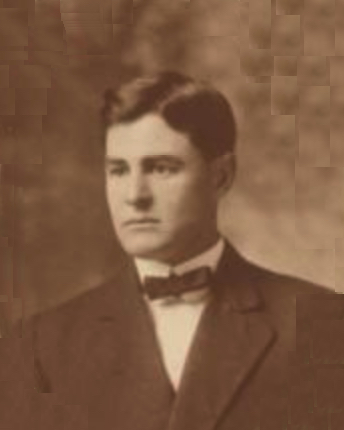
- Official portrait, 1908

Member of the Virginia Senate from the 5th district
- In office January 8, 1908 – January 10, 1912
- Preceded by: Peyton F. St. Clair
- Succeeded by: Alexander G. Crockett

Personal details
- Born: Albert Pendleton Strother; April 25, 1872 Pearisburg, Virginia, U.S.
- Died: January 26, 1946 (aged 73) Pearisburg, Virginia, U.S.
- Party: Republican
- Spouse: Mary Alice Williams
- Parent: Philip W. Strother (father)
- Relatives: James F. Strother (brother)

Albert Pendleton Strother (April 25, 1872 – January 26, 1946) was an American Republican politician who served as a member of the Virginia Senate. His elder brother was Congressman James F. Strother.

Senate of Virginia
Preceded by Peyton F. St. Clair	Virginia Senator for the 5th District; 1908–1912	Succeeded by Alexander G. Crockett
