= Philip W. Strother =

American politician (1839–1922)

Member of the Virginia House of Delegates from Giles County
- In office December 1, 1875 – December 5, 1877
- Preceded by: Samuel E. Lybrook
- Succeeded by: James D. Johnston

Member of the Virginia Senate
- In office December 4, 1865 – October 5, 1869

Personal details
- Born: Philip Williams Strother; September 8, 1839 Washington, Virginia, U.S.
- Died: May 9, 1922 (aged 82) Pearisburg, Virginia, U.S.
- Party: Conservative (1867‍–‍1877); Readjuster (1877‍–‍1880s); Republican (1880s‍–‍1922)
- Spouse: Nancy Pendleton (m. 1867)
- Children: 8, including James F. and A. Pendleton Strother
- Parent: James F. Strother (father)
- Relatives: John R. Strother (brother); Albert G. Pendleton (father-in-law)
- Occupation: Lawyer; politician; judge

Military service
- Allegiance: Confederate States
- Branch/service: Confederate States Army
- Rank: First lieutenant
- Unit: 13th Virginia Infantry
- Battles/wars: American Civil War

Philip Williams Strother (September 8, 1839 – May 9, 1922) was an American politician who served in both houses of the Virginia General Assembly.
