= Dunns, West Virginia =

Unincorporated community in West Virginia, United States

- Unincorporated community
- Location within the state of West Virginia Dunns, West Virginia (the United States)
- Coordinates: 37°32′35″N 81°03′11″W
- Country: United States
- State: West Virginia
- County: Mercer
- Elevation: 1,824 ft (556 m)
- Time zone: UTC-5 (Eastern (EST))
  - Summer (DST): UTC-4 (EDT)
- Area codes: 304 & 681
- GNIS feature ID: 1549664

Dunns is an unincorporated community in Mercer County, West Virginia, United States. Dunns is 8.5 miles (13.7 km) north of Athens.

The community derives its name from one Mr. Dunn.

== Notable person ==
Thomas Jefferson Lilly, a member of the United States House of Representatives
