= Jeremiah Morton =

American politician (1799–1878)

Member of the U.S. House of Representatives from Virginia's 9th district
- In office March 4, 1849 – March 3, 1851
- Preceded by: John Pendleton
- Succeeded by: James F. Strother

Personal details
- Born: September 3, 1799 Fredericksburg, Virginia, US
- Died: November 28, 1878 (aged 79) "Lessland", Orange County, Virginia, US
- Party: Whig
- Education: Washington College; College of William and Mary
- Profession: politician, lawyer, farmer

Jeremiah Morton (September 3, 1799 – November 28, 1878) was a nineteenth-century politician, lawyer, physician and architect from Virginia. He was a younger brother of Florida senator Jackson Morton.

== Early and family life ==
Born in Fredericksburg, Virginia, to wealthy landowner Jeremiah Morton and his wife, the former Mildred Garnett Jackson, young Jeremiah attended a private school in Culpeper Virginia, a few years behind Congressman John Strode Barbour, as would his brother George Morton. This Morton then attended Washington College in Lexington 1814 and 1815 before traveling eastward to Williamsburg for studies at the College of William and Mary, from which he graduated in 1819. He read law.

He married Mary Eleanor Jane Smith (1801-1876), daughter of Reuben Smith and his wife Milly, whose brothers moved to Texas before the Civil War. Their only surviving child, Mildred, married lawyer J.J. Halsey of Orange County, Virginia.

== Career ==
After admission to the Virginia bar, Morton began his legal practice in Raccoon Ford on the Rapidan River, and traveled to nearby county seats. Morton also was a physician and architect. He ultimately left his peripatetic legal career due to illness and instead ran several prosperous plantations using enslaved labor, as well as built mansions for other wealthy planters, as well as sponsored artists who came to the area. Morton owned 6 slaves in Henrico County, Virginia in 1840, when he lived in Richmond. According to the 1850 U.S. Federal Census, Morton owned 21 slaves in Culpeper County. In 1860, he owned 66 slaves in Orange County, Virginia, 19 of them under age 10.

Morton ran as a Whig and won election to the United States House of Representatives in 1848. He succeeded John S. Pendleton, a Democrat from Culpeper, but would only serve on term, from 1849 to 1851. After losing a reelection bid in 1850 to James F. Strother a Whig from Rappahannock County, Morton concentrated on his and others' plantations. An owner of several prosperous plantations, Morton reputedly had an income of the "then-princely" $30,000 (~$820,131 in 2024) a year.

== American Civil War ==
After Abraham Lincoln's election in 1860, Morton spoke at a mass meeting at Culpeper Court House chaired by Judge Henry Shackelford, at which Col. Alexander Taliaferro and Waller T. Patton seconded Morton's pro-secession resolutions. Orange and Greene County voters elected Morton to represent them at the Virginia Secession Convention of 1861 in 1861 and he became a leading secessionist, although most Whigs at the Convention were Unionists.

Fighting occurred near his home because of the importance of fords on the Rappahannock and Rapidan Rivers. The Battle of Cedar Mountain was a Confederate victory on August 9, 1862, but skirmishes continued during the following fortnight. On June 9, 1863, the Battle of Brandy Station would be the war's largest cavalry engagement of the war. Although inconclusive, no longer would the Confederates dominate cavalry engagements. The Battle of Culpeper Court House returned the area to Union control in September 1863, although considerable fighting continued into 1864. Union troops wintered at Culpeper (General Ulysses Grant) and Stevensburg (Lt.Gen. Judson Kilpatrick). The village of Raccoon Ford was burned on February 6, 1864, during an abortive attach on entrenchments on the Orange side of Morton's Road. A nearby field would be nicknamed for the cannon balls later found there. General Lee climbed nearby Clark's Mountain to review the devastation for the last time on May 4, 1864. No wonder Morton later complained "The scourge of war has swept all from me, and . . . I stand a blasted stump in the wilderness."

However, Morton in 1866 opposed even church re-union. fearing "that we may reap infidelity and the flood of 'isms' from the north. If they destroy our social institutions & desolate our homes and confiscate our property, I pray God, our southern Zyon[sic], may not be submerged." Although the colonial era brick Little Fork Church (1776) miraculously remained, its predecessor by several decades, Great Fork Church (built 1732) had been pulled down for firewood and St. Paul's Episcopal Church in Raccoon Fork was hopelessly dilapidated.

Morton also became a trustee of the Virginia Theological Seminary in Alexandria, Virginia, perhaps as early as 1855.

== Death and legacy ==
Morton survived his wife by two years. He died at Lessland in Orange County, Virginia, on November 28, 1878, and was interred at his old home, "Morton Hall" also in Orange County. Several of the houses he designed remain today on the National Register of Historic Places, including Greenville (Raccoon's Ford, Virginia), Mountain View, Struan and Summerduck along the Rapidan. He may also have designed Horse Shoe.

== Notes ==
U.S. House of Representatives
Preceded by John Pendleton	Member of the U.S. House of Representatives from Virginia's 9th congressional district March 4, 1849 – March 3, 1851	Succeeded by James F. Strother
