= Thomas Jefferson Lilly =

American politician

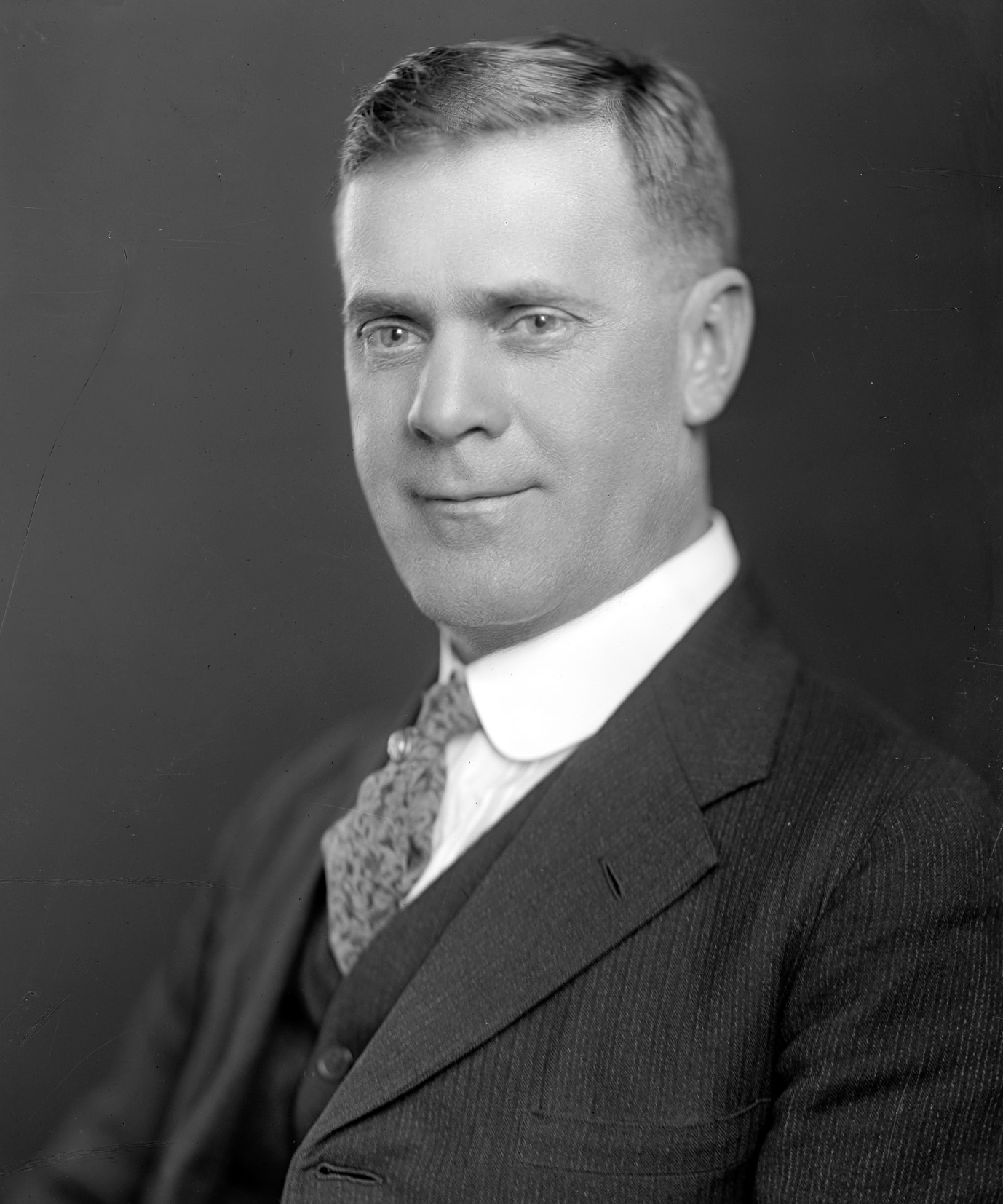
- Portrait by Harris & Ewing, c. 1923

Member of the U.S. House of Representatives from West Virginia's 5th district
- In office March 4, 1923 – March 3, 1925
- Preceded by: Wells Goodykoontz
- Succeeded by: James F. Strother

Personal details
- Born: June 3, 1878 Dunns, West Virginia, United States
- Died: April 2, 1956 (aged 77) Sweet Springs, West Virginia, United States
- Party: Democratic
- Spouse: Roxie May Lilly
- Children: 9
- Occupation: Lawyer; politician

Thomas Jefferson Lilly (June 3, 1878 – April 2, 1956) represented West Virginia in the sixty-eighth United States Congress. He was the son of Joseph L Lilly and Martha Jane Cox.

Thomas Lilly had a long career of service for his community and country. He was born in Dunns, West Virginia in Mercer County and began teaching in the rural schools of Mercer County while also tending to the family farm. He was elected Justice of the Peace and served from 1902 to 1906. After completing his term, he attended McKinley University in Chicago, Illinois, graduating with a degree in Law in 1911. He was admitted to the bar in West Virginia the same year and started practicing in Hinton, West Virginia.

After spending a few years practicing law, he went back to working for the local government as both the State Commissioner of Accounts (1914–1927) and the Divorce Commissioner of Summers County (1914–1922). He ran for Congress after completing these commissions and sat as a Democratic Representative in the 68th Congress of the United States from March 4, 1923 to March 3, 1925. His reelection attempt in 1924 failed.

Thomas returned to his law practice until his death in 1956 in Sweet Springs, West Virginia. He is buried in Restwood Memorial Cemetery, Hinton, West Virginia.

== Family ==
Thomas married Roxie May Lilly (1882–1983) and had 4 sons and 5 daughters.

U.S. House of Representatives
Preceded by Wells Goodykoontz	Member of the U.S. House of Representatives from West Virginia's 5th congressional district 1923–1925	Succeeded by James F. Strother
