= Struthers =

Struthers or Struther may refer to:

== People ==
By forename

- Struther Arnott (1934–2013), Scottish molecular biologist and chemist, former Principal and Vice-Chancellor of the University of St Andrews

By surname

- Betsy Struthers (born 1951), Canadian poet and novelist
- Crispin Struthers, Oscar-nominated film editor
- Cyntha Struthers (born c. 1954), Canadian statistician
- Jan Struther (1901–1953), pen name of English writer Joyce Anstruther, best known for her character Mrs. Miniver and a number of hymns
- John Struthers (anatomist) (1823–1899), Professor of Anatomy at the University of Aberdeen, Scotland
- John Struthers (poet) (1776–1853), Scottish poet and writer
- John Paterson (J.P.) Struthers (1865–1915), Scottish preacher, pastor and children's author
- Karen Struthers (born 1963), Australian politician
- Nora Jane Struthers (born 1983), American singer-songwriter
- Sally Struthers (born 1947), American actress and spokeswoman
- Stan Struthers (born 1959), Canadian politician

== Places ==
- Struthers, Ohio, a city
- Struthers Lake, Saskatchewan, Canada

== See also ==
- Strother (disambiguation)
- Strothers, a surname
