= James A. Strother =

American politician (1870–1930)

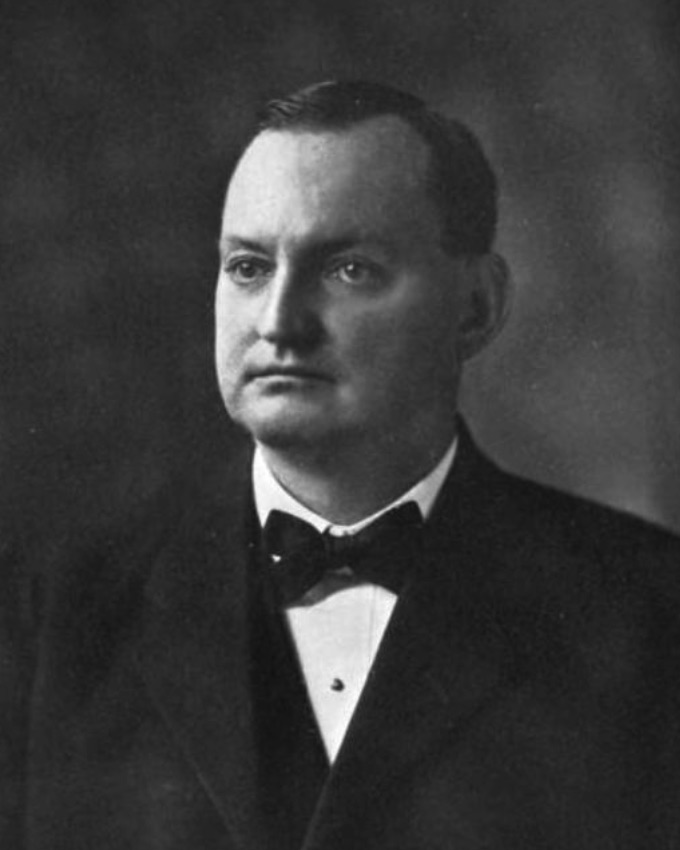
- Portrait of Strother, c. 1913

Member of the West Virginia House of Delegates from McDowell County
- In office December 1, 1920 – December 1, 1924
- Preceded by: William J. McClaren
- Succeeded by: E. Wade Cullen
- In office December 1, 1906 – December 1, 1912
- Preceded by: T. C. Herndon
- Succeeded by: George Wolfe

Member of the West Virginia Senate from the 6th district
- In office December 1, 1912 – December 1, 1916
- Preceded by: Henry D. Hatfield
- Succeeded by: John W. Luther

Personal details
- Born: James Alexander Strother; January 30, 1870 Rotherwood, Virginia, U.S.
- Died: April 4, 1930 (aged 60) Welch, West Virginia, U.S.
- Party: Republican
- Spouse: Mary Taylor (m. 1894)
- Children: 2
- Parent: John R. Strother (father)
- Education: University of Virginia
- Occupation: Lawyer; farmer; politician; judge

James Alexander Strother (January 13, 1870 – April 4, 1930) was an American lawyer and politician who served in both houses of the West Virginia Legislature and as a local judge. He previously served as mayor of Welch, West Virginia.

In 1907, Strother and his brother, Philip, were put on trial in Culpeper, Virginia, charged with the murder of their brother-in-law, William F. Bywaters. Bywaters was killed on December 15, 1906, just moments after he married the Strothers' sister, Viola. He was allegedly pressured into the marriage, after Viola took ill and it was revealed that she had been pregnant by him; the brothers shot Bywaters to death after he reportedly rushed past his new wife, then confined to her bed, and tried to escape the house following the ceremony. Having argued that the dishonoring of their sister caused them to enter a state of temporary insanity, the Strothers were found not guilty on all counts. Viola would go on to make a full recovery.
