= James E. Slaughter =

American soldier (1827–1901)

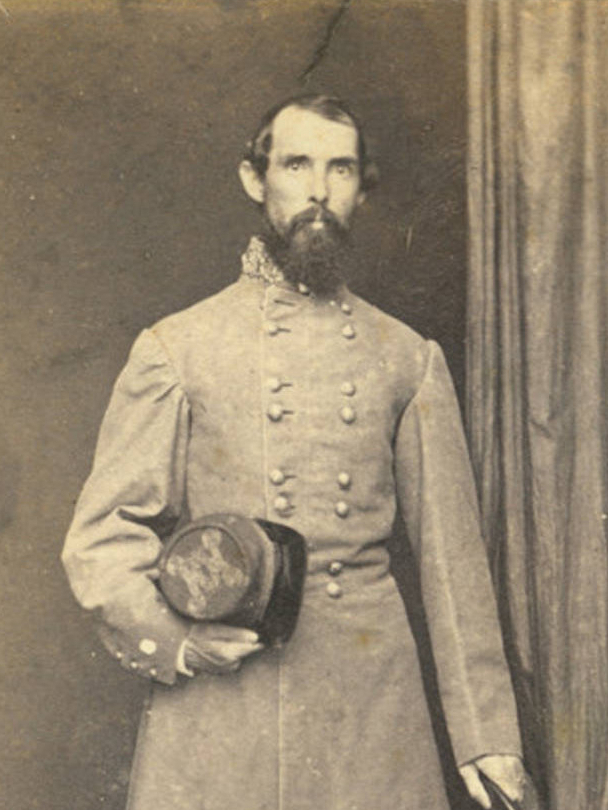
- Born: June 1827; Cedar Mountain, Virginia
- Died: January 1, 1901 (aged 73–74); Mexico City
- Burial place: Mexico City National Cemetery
- Military career
- Allegiance: United States of America; Confederate States of America
- Branch: United States Army; Confederate States Army
- Service years: 1847–1861 (USA); 1861–1865 (CSA)
- Rank: First Lieutenant (USA); Brigadier General (CSA)
- Conflicts: Mexican–American War; American Civil War

James Edwin Slaughter (June 1827 – January 1, 1901) was an American soldier who fought in the Mexican American War, and later resigned in order to fight in the Confederate States Army, where he rose to the rank of Brigadier General.

== Early and family life ==
Born in 1827 on what was sometimes called Slaughter Mountain, Culpeper County, Virginia, the eldest son of Daniel French Slaughter and his first wife, the former Letitia Madison. Slaughter's paternal grandfathers and great-grandfathers had helped settle Culpeper County and both sides of his family descended from the First Families of Virginia. Col. Robert Slaughter and Lt. William Slaughter fought in the French and Indian War; his namesake Col. James Slaughter supported the patriots in the American Revolutionary War as had another great-grandfather, French Strother (James Slaughter serving on the local Committee of Safety and fighting at the Battle of Great Bridge and wintering with neighbor John Marshall at Valley Forge, Pennsylvania). Through his mother, J.E. Strother was the great-nephew of President James Madison. Generations of his family had farmed in Virginia using enslaved labor. James Slaughter entered the Virginia Military Institute in Lexington, Virginia on August 6, 1845, but attended for only one year.

== Early U.S. Army career ==
Slaughter resigned from the school on July 6, 1846, because he accepted a commission in the U.S. Army, becoming a 2nd Lieutenant in the newly formed regiment of Voltigeurs and Foot Riflemen, recruited to fight in the Mexican–American War. He accompanied General Winfield Scott and his army to Mexico City as a 2nd Lieutenant during the war. He was the first to inform the Mexican government of the deceptiveness of the Well and Labra claims.

After the war's end, Slaughter transferred to the U.S. 1st Artillery Regiment in June 1848 and would serve with this regiment until the outbreak of the American Civil War in 1861. He was promoted to 1st Lieutenant in 1852. He resigned from the army in May 1861 shortly after Virginia voters approved the Ordinance of Secession recommended by the Virginia Secession Convention, and promptly joined the Confederate Army.

== Confederate officer ==
Slaughter accepted a commission as first lieutenant, Corps of Artillery in the Confederate States Army but soon became Inspector-General on the staff of General P.G.T. Beauregard after the transfer of the latter to the Department of Alabama and West Florida. After the bombardment of Pensacola, in which Lieutenant Slaughter rendered valuable service under fire, General Beauregard reported that probably more than anyone else in his command, he was indebted for the patient labor and unceasing vigil given to the organization and instruction of the troops. In November 1861 he was promoted to Major.

Beauregard earnestly recommended Slaughter's promotion to brigadier-general, which was granted on March 8, 1862. Slaughter became General Albert Sidney Johnston's assistant inspector general at the Battle of Shiloh the following month.

In May 1862, he was appointed chief of the inspector-general's Department of the Army of the Mississippi, under General Braxton Bragg. Gen. Slaughter continued in that position through the Kentucky Campaign, and was then assigned to the charge of the troops of Mobile, Alabama, that port being threatened by Federal invasion. Meanwhile, the Battle of Cedar Mountain was fought on his family's Virginia lands in August 1862, as would later be part of the Battle of Brandy Station in June 1863, leading to considerable destruction of which family members later complained.

In April 1863, Brigadier General Slaughter was transferred to Galveston, Texas as Chief of Artillery for General John Bankhead Magruder. Later in the year, he received command of all the troops of the Second Division, and instructed to defend the eastern sub-district of Texas. During the remainder of the war he played an important part in Confederate affairs in Texas, for some time performing the duties of chief of staff.

Slaughter participated in the last significant land battle of the American Civil War at Palmito Ranch in Texas on May 13, 1865. He arrived on the battlefield after the defeated Union forces had already commenced their retreat. It was reported that Slaughter "rode up to the edge of the tidal slough, drew his revolver and blazed away at the distant Yankees."

Upon Lee's surrender at Appomattox Court House, Brigadier General Slaughter fled to Mexico, where he stayed for several years and worked as a civil engineer. He returned to work in Mobile, Alabama and then eventually made his home in New Orleans.

== Death and legacy ==
While visiting Mexico City, James Slaughter became ill and ultimately died of pneumonia on January 1, 1901. He never married.

He is buried in the Mexico City National Cemetery.

== See also ==
- List of American Civil War generals (Confederate)
