= John Pendleton =

American politician

Member of the Virginia House of Delegates from the Culpeper district
- In office December 5, 1831 – December 1, 1833 Serving with Edmond Broadus, Philip Thornton
- Preceded by: Jonathan C. Gibson, Sr.
- Succeeded by: John S. Barbour

Member of the Virginia House of Delegates from the Rappahannnock district
- In office December 5, 1836 – December 1, 1839
- Preceded by: Joseph Nicklin
- Succeeded by: William Walden

Member of the U.S. House of Representatives from Virginia's 9th district
- In office March 4, 1845 – March 3, 1849
- Preceded by: Samuel Chilton
- Succeeded by: Jeremiah Morton

Personal details
- Born: March 29, 1813 Culpeper, Virginia, US
- Died: November 19, 1868 (aged 66) Culpeper, Virginia, US
- Party: Whig
- Spouse: Lucy Ann Williams
- Profession: politician, lawyer, diplomat, farmer

John Strother Pendleton (March 1, 1802 – November 19, 1868), nicknamed "The Lone Star", was a nineteenth-century congressman, diplomat, lawyer and farmer from Virginia.

== Early and family life ==
Born near Culpeper, Virginia, Pendleton studied with private tutors and at Cloverdale Academy, then read law. He married Lucy Ann Williams, the daughter of James and Elizabeth Bruce Williams, on December 2, 1824, at "Soldiers Rest" in Orange County, Virginia. During the 1820s, he resided at the Slaughter-Hill House, listed on the National Register of Historic Places in 1989. The two had no biological children, but adopted Lucy's brother Philip's son, George Morton Williams, when he was three years old.

== Career ==
After admission to the Virginia bar in 1824, Pendleton began his legal practice in Culpeper County, Virginia. Culpeper's voters elected Pendleton as their representative to the Virginia House of Delegates from 1831 to 1833, and not long after Rappahannock County, Virginia was created from part of Culpeper County, Rappahannock County voters selected him to represent them from 1836 to 1839.

President John Tyler, a fellow Whig from Virginia, appointed Pendleton Chargé d'Affaires to Chile in 1841, and he served until 1844 when he was elected a Whig to the United States House of Representatives. He was re-elected once, and served from 1845 to 1849. In the House, Pendleton obtained the nickname "The Lone Star" because he was the only Whig from Virginia.

Pendleton returned to his diplomatic career, as President Millard Fillmore appointed him Chargé d'Affaires to the Argentine Confederation in 1851. He arrived in Buenos Aires on August 22, 1851. He served until 1854. In 1852, he also served as Minister to Brazil with Robert C. Schenck to negotiate a treaty of commerce with Paraguay and Uruguay.

Pendleton returned to the United States and engaged in farming, but his estate was devastated by the American Civil War, particularly the Battle of Cedar Mountain, such that he appeared before General Banks for permission to leave the county. However, by March 1863, he was able to extend hospitality to Confederate officers at his estate, "Redwood", after a St. Patrick's Day Party, although several would die in battles the following days including at Kelly's Ford.

== Death ==
Pendleton survived the war and died on November 19, 1868, near Culpeper, Virginia.

U.S. House of Representatives
Preceded by Samuel Chilton	Member of the U.S. House of Representatives from Virginia's 9th congressional district March 4, 1845 – March 3, 1849	Succeeded by Jeremiah Morton
Diplomatic posts
Preceded by Richard Pollard	United States Ambassador to Chile; August 16, 1841 – June 6, 1844	Succeeded by William Crump
Preceded by William A. Harris	United States Chargé d'Affaires, Argentina; February 27, 1851 – March 31, 1854	Succeeded by James A. Peden
