= Thomas L. Tate =

American politician

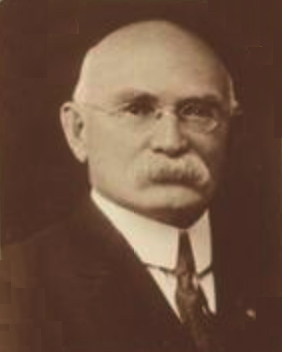

Member of the Virginia House of Delegates from Pulaski County
- In office January 10, 1912 – January 14, 1914
- Preceded by: James T. Trolinger
- Succeeded by: Ollie E. Jordan

Member of the Virginia Senate from the 5th district
- In office December 1, 1897 – December 4, 1901
- Preceded by: Joel C. Green
- Succeeded by: Peyton F. St. Clair

Personal details
- Born: Thomas Leonidas Tate; February 18, 1847 Wythe, Virginia, U.S.
- Died: December 4, 1925 (aged 78)
- Party: Democratic
- Spouse: Lucy Painter
- Education: Virginia Military Institute

Military service
- Allegiance: Confederate States
- Branch/service: Confederate States Army
- Years of service: 1861–1865
- Battles/wars: American Civil War

Thomas Leonidas Tate (February 18, 1847 – December 4, 1925) was an American politician who served as a member of the Virginia Senate and Virginia House of Delegates.

Senate of Virginia
Preceded by Joel C. Green	Virginia Senator for the 5th District; 1897–1901	Succeeded by Peyton F. St. Clair
