= Peyton F. St. Clair =

American politician

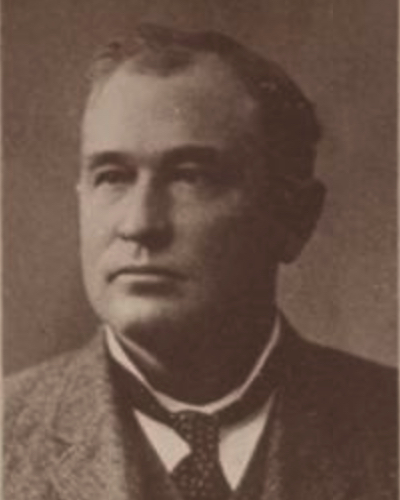

Member of the Virginia Senate from the 5th district
- In office December 4, 1901 – January 8, 1908
- Preceded by: Thomas L. Tate
- Succeeded by: A. Pendleton Strother

Personal details
- Born: Peyton Ferdinand St. Clair; August 15, 1860
- Died: August 17, 1914 (aged 54)
- Party: Democratic
- Spouse: Lura Cecil

Peyton Ferdinand St. Clair (August 15, 1860 – August 17, 1914) was an American politician who served as a member of the Virginia Senate.

Senate of Virginia
Preceded by Thomas L. Tate	Virginia Senator for the 5th District; 1901–1908	Succeeded by A. Pendleton Strother
