= John R. Strother =

American politician (1837–1904)

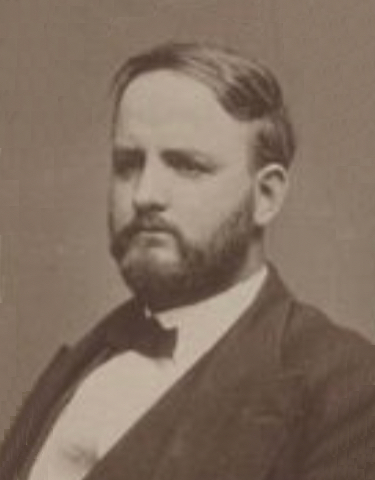
- Official portrait, 1874

Member of the Virginia Senate from the 15th district
- In office December 3, 1879 – December 7, 1881
- Preceded by: Daniel A. Grimsley
- Succeeded by: Horace D. Twyman

Member of the Virginia House of Delegates from Culpeper County
- In office October 5, 1869 – December 1, 1875
- Preceded by: G. Judson Browning
- Succeeded by: Thomas B. Nalle

Personal details
- Born: John Roberts Strother; September 25, 1837 Washington, Virginia, U.S.
- Died: February 14, 1904 (aged 66) Rotherwood, Virginia, U.S.
- Party: Conservative/Democratic
- Spouse: Viola Payne (m. 1869)
- Children: 8, including James A.
- Parent: James F. Strother (father)
- Relatives: Philip W. Strother (brother)
- Occupation: Lawyer; farmer; politician

Military service
- Allegiance: Confederate States
- Branch/service: Confederate States Army
- Rank: Captain
- Unit: 7th Virginia Infantry
- Battles/wars: American Civil War

John Roberts Strother (September 25, 1837 – February 14, 1904) was an American politician who served in both houses of the Virginia General Assembly.
