= James F. Strother (West Virginia politician) =

American politician

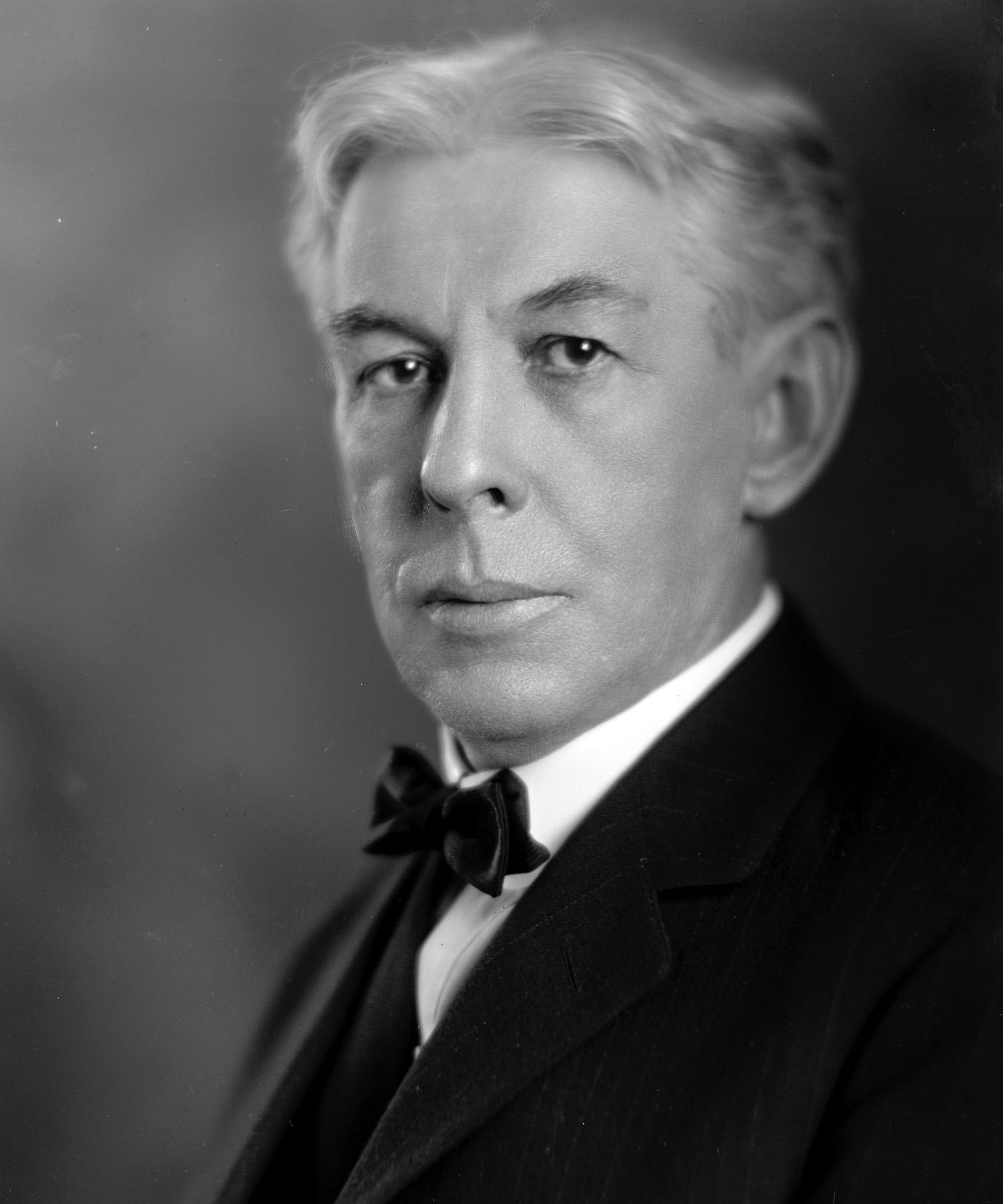
- Portrait by Harris & Ewing, c. 1925

Member of the U.S. House of Representatives from West Virginia's 5th district
- In office March 4, 1925 – March 3, 1929
- Preceded by: Thomas Jefferson Lilly
- Succeeded by: Hugh Ike Shott

Personal details
- Born: James French Strother; June 29, 1868 Pearisburg, Virginia, U.S.
- Died: April 10, 1930 (aged 61) Welch, West Virginia, U.S.
- Party: Republican
- Spouses: Emily Morrison Bondurant (m. 1896; died 1904); Lucile Lucas (m. 1924)
- Parent: Philip W. Strother (father)
- Relatives: A. Pendleton Strother (brother)
- Education: Virginia A&M College (BS); University of Virginia (LLB)
- Occupation: Lawyer; judge; politician

James French Strother (June 29, 1868 – April 10, 1930) was the grandson of Congressman James French Strother (1811-1860) of Virginia and great-grandson of Congressman George French Strother, also of Virginia. Strother was a lawyer, judge, and U. S. Representative from West Virginia.

Strother was born near Pearisburg in Giles County on June 29, 1868. He attend public schools, the private Pearisburg Academy, Virginia Agricultural and Mechanical College in Blacksburg, and the University of Virginia School of Law.

After graduation, Strother become the deputy collector of internal revenue at Lynchburg, Virginia from 1890 to 1893. He studied law at the University of Virginia at Charlottesville and was admitted to the bar in 1894 and started his law practice in Pearisburg the same year. In 1895 Strother moved his law practice to Welch in McDowell County, West Virginia. He was appointed judge of the criminal court of McDowell County by Gov. Albert B. White on January 1, 1905, and was elected to the same post three times, serving until he resigned on September 30, 1924.

Strother was elected from West Virginia's 5th District as a Republican to the Sixty-ninth and Seventieth Congresses (March 4, 1925 - March 3, 1929). He was not a candidate for renomination in 1928. Congressman Strother died in Welch, on April 10, 1930 and was interred in Monte Vista Cemetery, Bluefield, West Virginia.

U.S. House of Representatives
Preceded by Thomas Jefferson Lilly	Member of the U.S. House of Representatives from West Virginia's 5th congressional district 1925-1929	Succeeded by Hugh Ike Shott
