= Strothers =

Surname list

Strothers is the surname of the following people

- Jimmie Strothers (1883–1942?), Americain folk musician
- Joan Strothers (1916–1999), Welsh scientist on atomic bomb
- Lamont Strothers (born in 1968), Americain basketball player
- Tim Strothers (1879–1942), Americain baseball player

== See also ==
- Strother (disambiguation)
- Struthers (disambiguation)
