= Emily Vielé Strother =

American writer (1866–1959)

- Strother (circa 1915)
- Born: March 18, 1866; New York, New York, United States
- Died: August 24, 1959 (aged 93)

Emily Vielé Strother (March 18, 1866 – August 24, 1959) was an American novelist.

== Biography ==
She was born Emily Vielé in New York, the daughter of Teresa (Griffin) Viele (author of a memoir of army life, Following the Drum) and Egbert Ludovicus Viele, a Union Army officer and later U.S. Representative from New York. Her paternal grandfather John L. Viele was a New York politician, and her brothers Francis Vielé-Griffin and Herman Knickerbocker Vielé were both writers. Her parents initially settled in Southold, Long Island, but later moved to Ashford Hill. In 1870, Emily's parents separated (they subsequently divorced), and her mother moved to Paris with Emily and Francis.

She is best known for her autobiographical novel Eve Dorre: The Story of Her Precarious Youth (1915). Told in the first person, it offers a slightly fictionalized account of her and her siblings' upbringing in Paris. Critics found it vivid, fresh, and entertaining.

She married Thomas Nelson Strother (b. 1863) of Baltimore, Maryland; they had several children.
