= John H. Morrison =

American lawyer (1933–2026)

John Horton Morrison (September 15, 1933 – March 12, 2026) was an American lawyer who was a senior partner of the law firm Kirkland & Ellis (retired 1999) and President of the Association of American Rhodes Scholars.

== Education ==
- University of New Mexico, BBA 1955
- University of Oxford (Rhodes Scholar—University College), BA in Jurisprudence 1957, MA 1961
- Harvard Law School, JD 1962

== Practice ==
From 1962 until January 1999, John practiced at Kirkland & Ellis in Chicago. Prior to his retirement at age 65, Morrison worked in the areas of antitrust and trade regulation (both civil and criminal litigation), product liability and general business litigation. In the late 1990s, Morrison had responsibility for certain loss prevention matters at Kirkland & Ellis, including active supervision of the conflicts of interest procedures.

After retiring from private practice, Morrison continued his active arbitration practice which began in about 1968. He arbitrated 17 significant commercial cases from 1990, mostly under AAA commercial rules (including AAA international rules), some as panel chair and a number as sole arbitrator.

== Personal life and death ==
Morrison was married to Barbara, and had three daughters, Marlene Morrison Turvill, Melanie Lanning Sweeney and Meredith Horton Morrison. He died in Evanston, Illinois, on March 12, 2026, at the age of 92.

== See also ==
- https://web.archive.org/web/20110707084359/http://www.adrchambersinternational.com/cvmorrison.htm
- https://web.archive.org/web/20080517000050/http://www.cidra.org/resumes/jmor.htm
