= Alexander G. Crockett =

American office holder

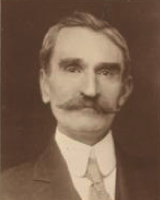

Member of the Virginia Senate from the 5th district
- In office January 10, 1912 – January 12, 1916
- Preceded by: A. Pendleton Strother
- Succeeded by: E. Lee Trinkle

Personal details
- Born: Alexander George Crockett; February 22, 1862 Wythe County, Virginia, U.S.
- Died: July 27, 1919 (aged 57) Max Meadows, Virginia, U.S.
- Party: Democratic
- Spouse(s): Mary Raper Thorne; Elizabeth Mcgavock Robertson
- Education: Emory & Henry College; Vanderbilt University

Alexander George Crockett (February 22, 1862 – July 27, 1919) was an American Democratic politician who served as a member of the Virginia Senate, representing the state's 5th district.

Senate of Virginia
Preceded by A. Pendleton Strother	Virginia Senator for the 5th District; 1912–1916	Succeeded by E. Lee Trinkle
