= Greenville (Raccoon's Ford, Virginia) =

Historic house in Virginia, United States

- U.S. National Register of Historic Places
- Virginia Landmarks Register
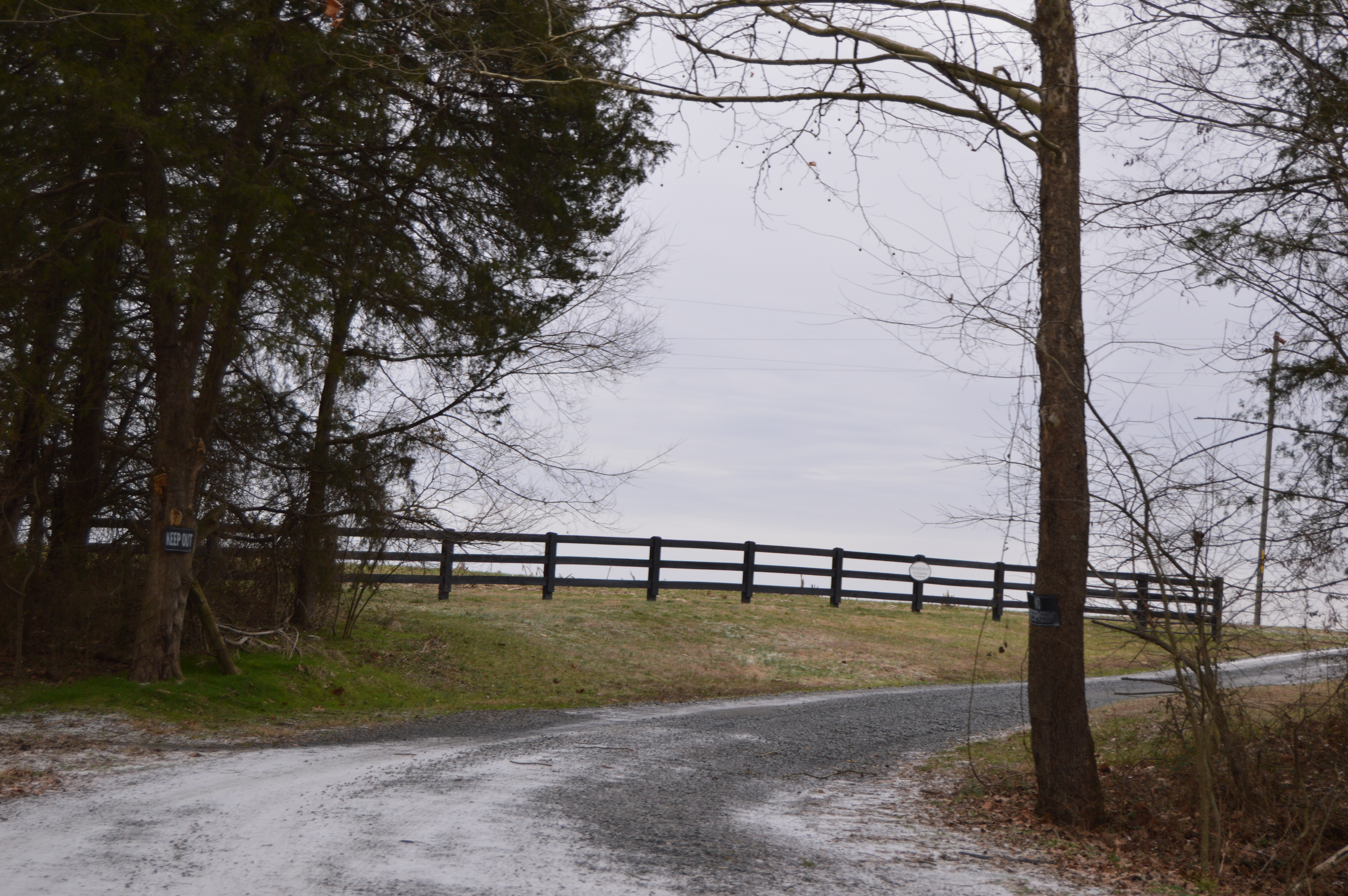
- Property entrance

- Location within Virginia Location within the United States
- Location: NE of Raccoon's Ford, near Raccoon's Ford, Virginia
- Coordinates: 38°22′24″N 77°55′11″W
- Area: 3.5 acres (1.4 ha)
- Built: 1847
- Architect: Jeremiah Morton
- Architectural style: Mid 19th Century Revival, Classical Revival
- NRHP reference No.: 80004184
- VLR No.: 023-0009

Significant dates
- Added to NRHP: March 17, 1980
- Designated VLR: December 18, 1979

Greenville is a historic plantation home located near Raccoon's Ford, Culpeper County, Virginia. Building of the property commenced in 1847 and was completed in 1854. The home originally belonged to Philip Pendleton Nalle.

== History ==
The home is a three-story, central-hall plan Classical Revival style brick dwelling. It measures 54 feet by 38 feet, 8 inches, and has a low pitched, W-shaped, ridge-and-valley roof. The front facade features a three-story portico with Tuscan order, stuccoed brick columns. Also on the property is a contributing outbuilding.

It was listed on the National Register of Historic Places in 1980.
