= Egbert Ludovicus Viele =

American politician (1825–1902)

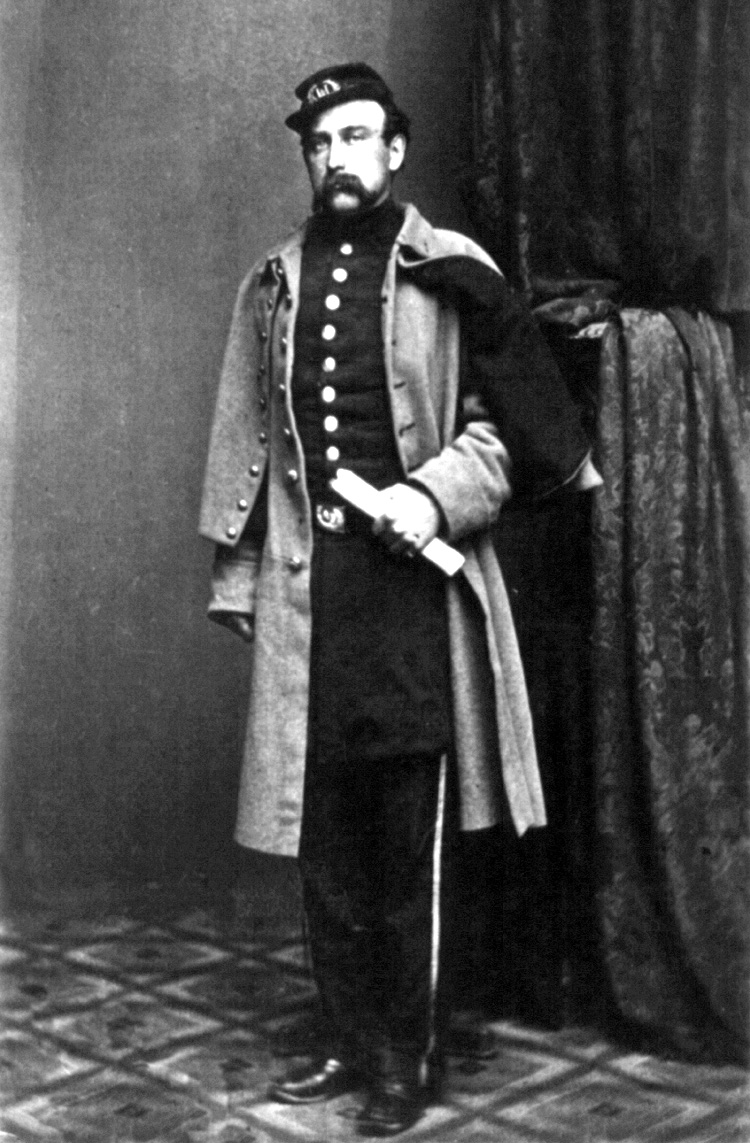
- Born: June 17, 1825; Waterford, New York
- Died: April 22, 1902 (aged 76); New York City, New York
- Burial place: West Point Cemetery
- Spouses: Teresa Griffin (m. 1850; div. 1872); Juliette Dana (m. 1872; died 1899)
- Children: 4, including Herman, Francis and Emily
- Military career
- Allegiance: United States of America; Union
- Branch: United States Army; Union Army
- Service years: 1847–1853, 1861–1863
- Rank: Brigadier General
- Units: 2nd U.S. Infantry Regiment; 7th New York Militia
- Conflicts: American Civil War

Signature
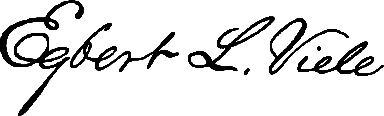

Egbert Ludovicus Viele (/ˈviːli/) (June 17, 1825 – April 22, 1902) was a civil engineer and United States Representative from New York from 1885 to 1887, as well as an officer in the Union army during the American Civil War.

== Biography ==
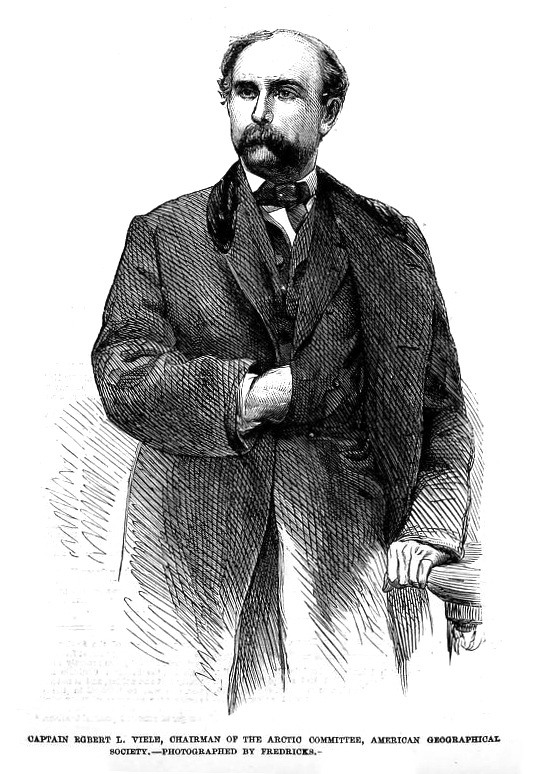

Viele was born in Waterford, New York (Saratoga County), a son of Kathlyne Schuyler (Knickerbocker) and State Senator John L. Viele. He graduated with honors from The Albany Academy and studied law briefly before entering the United States Military Academy at West Point, New York. He graduated on July 1, 1847, and was commissioned as a brevet second lieutenant in the 2nd U.S. Infantry.

He served in the Mexican–American War and was promoted to second lieutenant in the First United States Infantry on September 8, 1847. From 1848 to 1849 he was assigned to establish a military camp at Laredo, Texas, which was named "Camp Crawford." Viele was promoted to first lieutenant on October 26, 1850. He resigned from the service in 1853 to become a civil engineer.

He received an appointment as State Engineer of New Jersey in 1855 with a commission to conduct a topographical survey of the state. He also surveyed the environs that would become Central Park in New York City and submitted a design proposal. A competition was held which was awarded to the Greensward Plan from Frederick Law Olmsted and Calvert Vaux. Viele was appointed engineer-in-chief of Central Park in 1856, and engineer of Prospect Park (also in New York City) in 1860.

Viele was a captain in the Engineer Corps of the 7th New York Militia in 1860, and was given a Commission as Brigadier General, U.S. Volunteers, on August 17, 1861, after the Civil War began. He commanded forces on the Savannah River during the Siege of Fort Pulaski and was appointed Military Governor of Norfolk, Virginia, in 1862. He resigned from service on October 20, 1863, to again engage in civil engineering.

== Viele Map ==
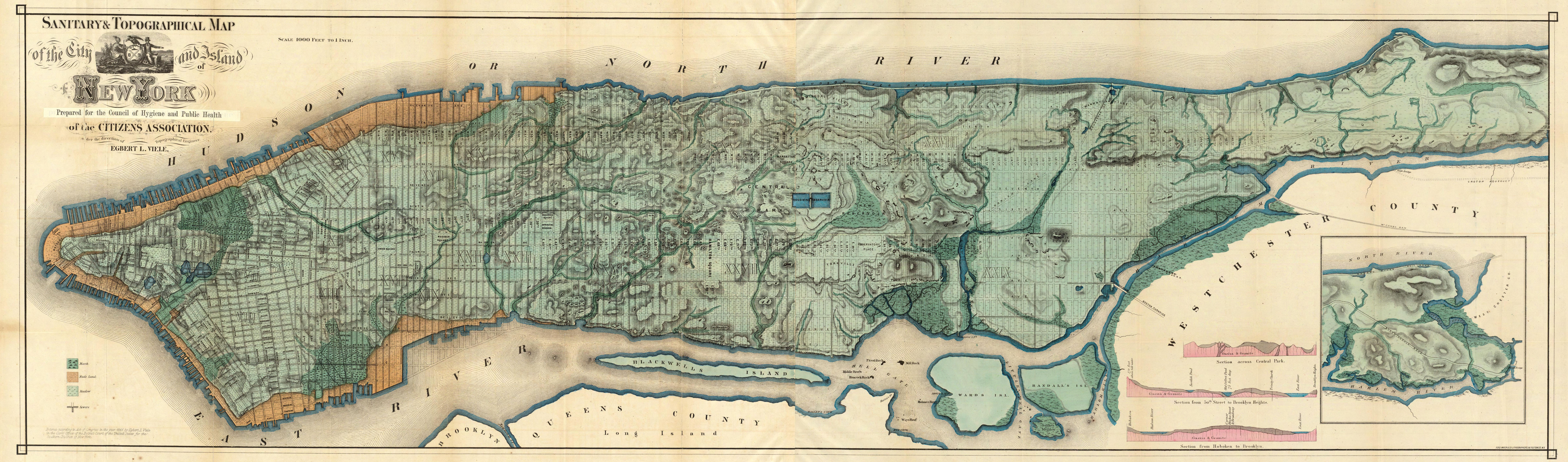
The "Viele Map", formally called the "Sanitary & Topographical Map of the City and Island of New York", developed by Viele in 1865

Viele was author of a color city map, a "Sanitary & Topographical Map of the City and Island of New York," first published in 1865, and now called the "Viele Map", which shows his survey of the original streams, marshes and coastline of New York City, superimposed over the street grid. The map is still used by modern geotechnical engineers, structural engineers and planners to design the foundations of new buildings and structures in the city.

== Later life and death ==
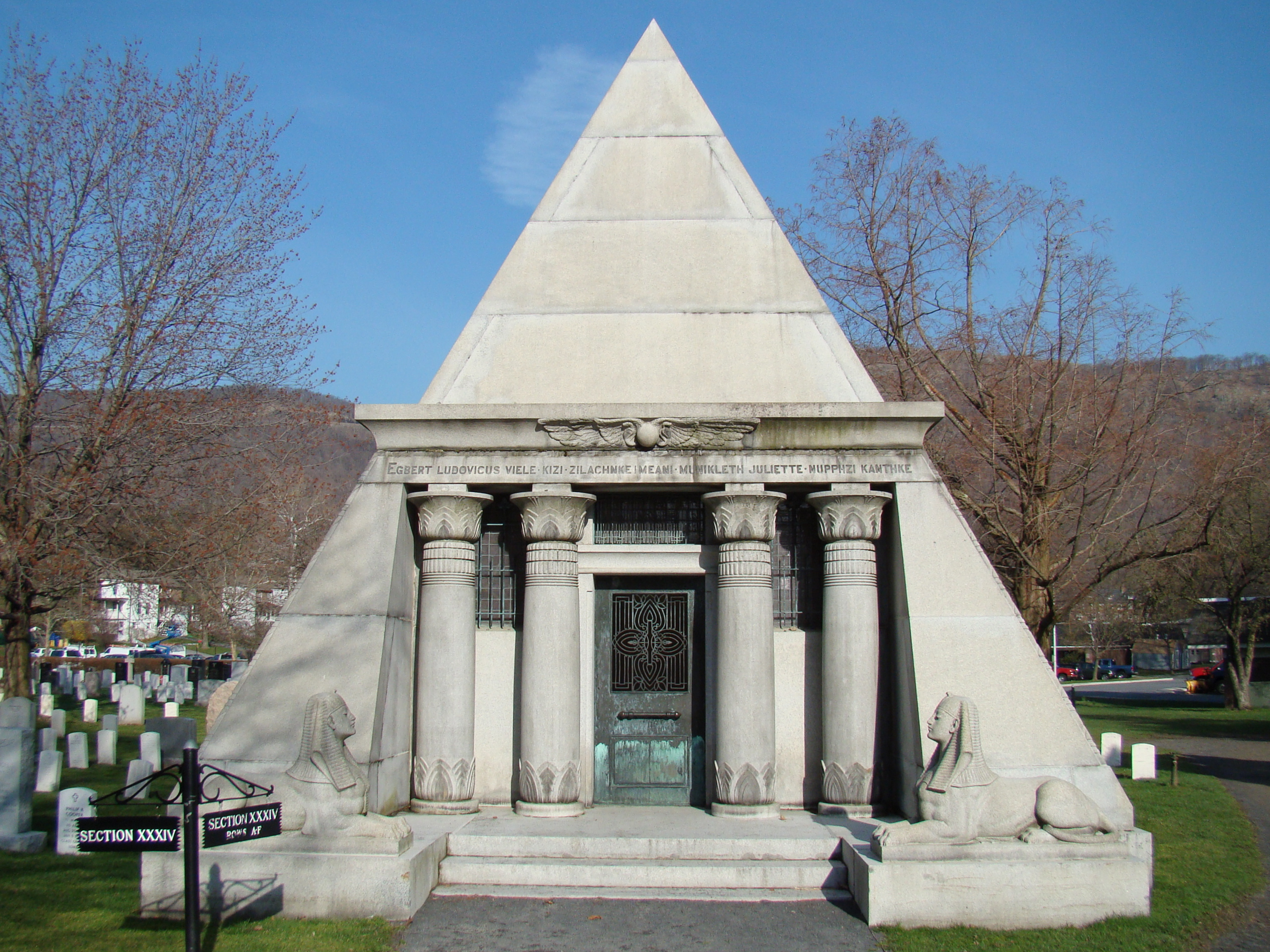
Viele's mausoleum at West Point Cemetery

In 1866 he became a Companion of the New York Commandery of the Military Order of the Loyal Legion of the United States and later, Companion of the New York Commandery of the Military Order of Foreign Wars. In 1867, he worked as chief engineer on the Buffalo and Pittsburgh Railroad.

From 1883 to 1884, Viele was the commissioner of parks for New York City. He was elected as a Democrat to the Forty-ninth Congress (March 4, 1885 – March 3, 1887) and an unsuccessful candidate for re-election in 1886 to the Fiftieth Congress; he resumed his former business pursuits and engaged in literary work.

In 1886, he joined the Aztec Club of 1847. He served as the club's president from 1899 to 1900.

Viele died on April 22, 1902 in New York City. He and his second wife are entombed in a pyramid-shaped mausoleum, guarded by a pair of sphinxes, in the Post Cemetery at West Point, New York. Viele had a buzzer installed in his coffin wired to caretaker's cottage so as to provide rescue if Viele had been accidentally buried alive.

== Personal life ==
Viele married Teresa Griffin, author of Following the Drum, on June 3, 1850, and they had several children, including the writers Francis Viélé-Griffin, Herman Knickerbocker Vielé, and Emily Vielé Strother. Viele and his first wife were divorced in 1872, and he married Juliette Dana that same year. His second wife died in 1899.

== Publications ==
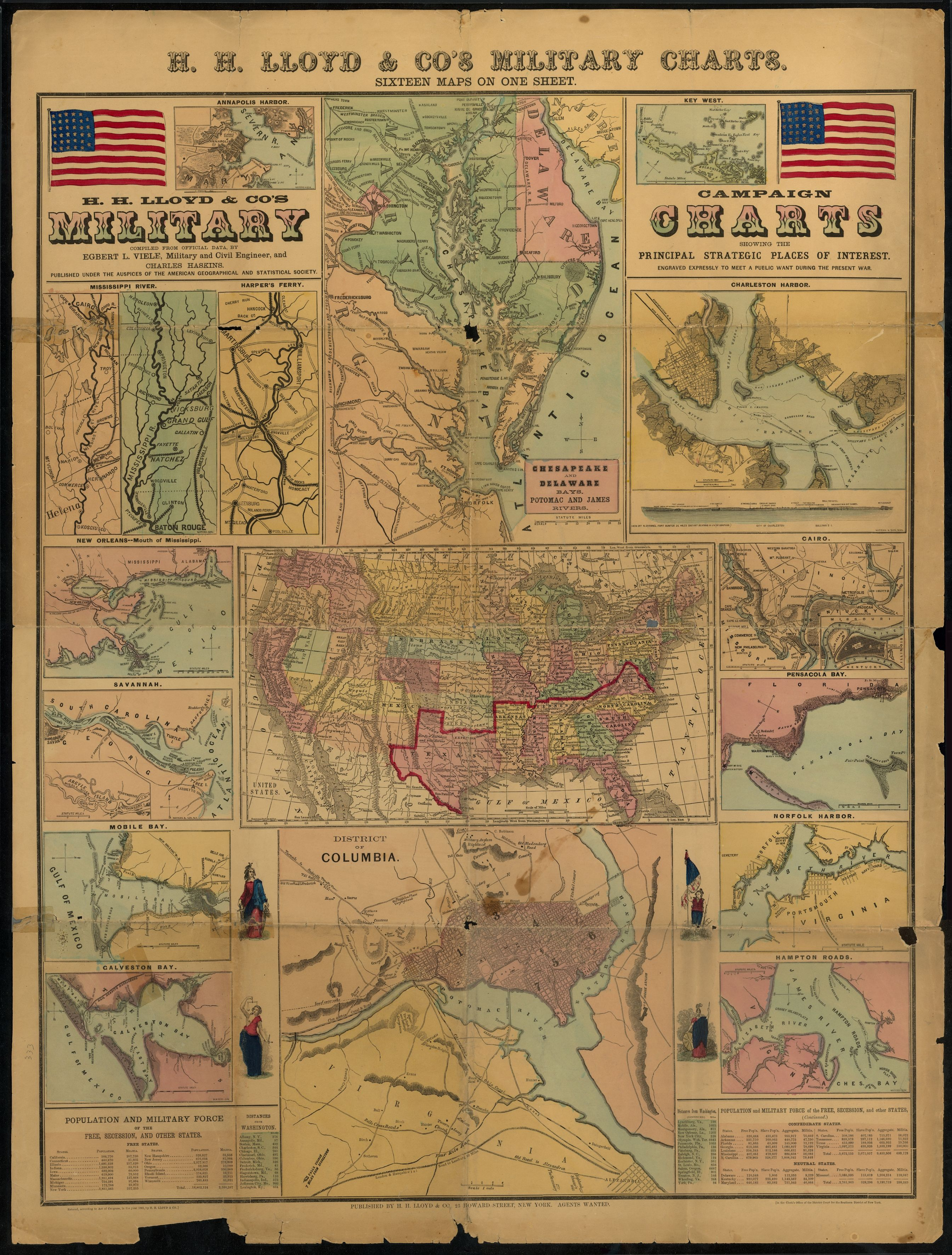
Egbert L. Viele and Charles Haskins, H. H. Lloyd & Co.'s Military Charts Showing the Principal Strategic Places of Interest, 1861

- Hand-book for active service; containing practical instructions in campaign duties. For the use of volunteers. (1861) New York: D. Van Nostrand. Reprint: (1968) New York: Greenwood Press.
- Sanitary & Topographical Map of the City and Island of New York Prepared for the Council of Hygiene and Public Health of the Citizens Association. Under the direction of Egbert L. Viele, Topographical Engineer. Entered … 1865 by Egbert L. Viele … New York. Ferd. Mayer & Co. Lithographers, 96 Fulton St. New York (1865), the "Viele Map" (1:12,000 scale with 1 inset map and 3 profiles).
- Topographical Atlas of the City of New York (1874) New York: R. Craighead, printer. Original map reissued in a larger format and abbreviated title, also published as a pocket map.The original map is now owned by Arthur Viele.
- Publications by Egbert Ludovicus Viele – Internet archive – online

== See also ==
- List of American Civil War generals (Union)

U.S. House of Representatives
| Preceded by John H. Ketcham | Member of the U.S. House of Representatives from New York's 13th congressional district 1885–1887 | Succeeded by Ashbel P. Fitch |
