= Lessland =

Historic house in Virginia, United States

- U.S. National Register of Historic Places
- Virginia Landmarks Register
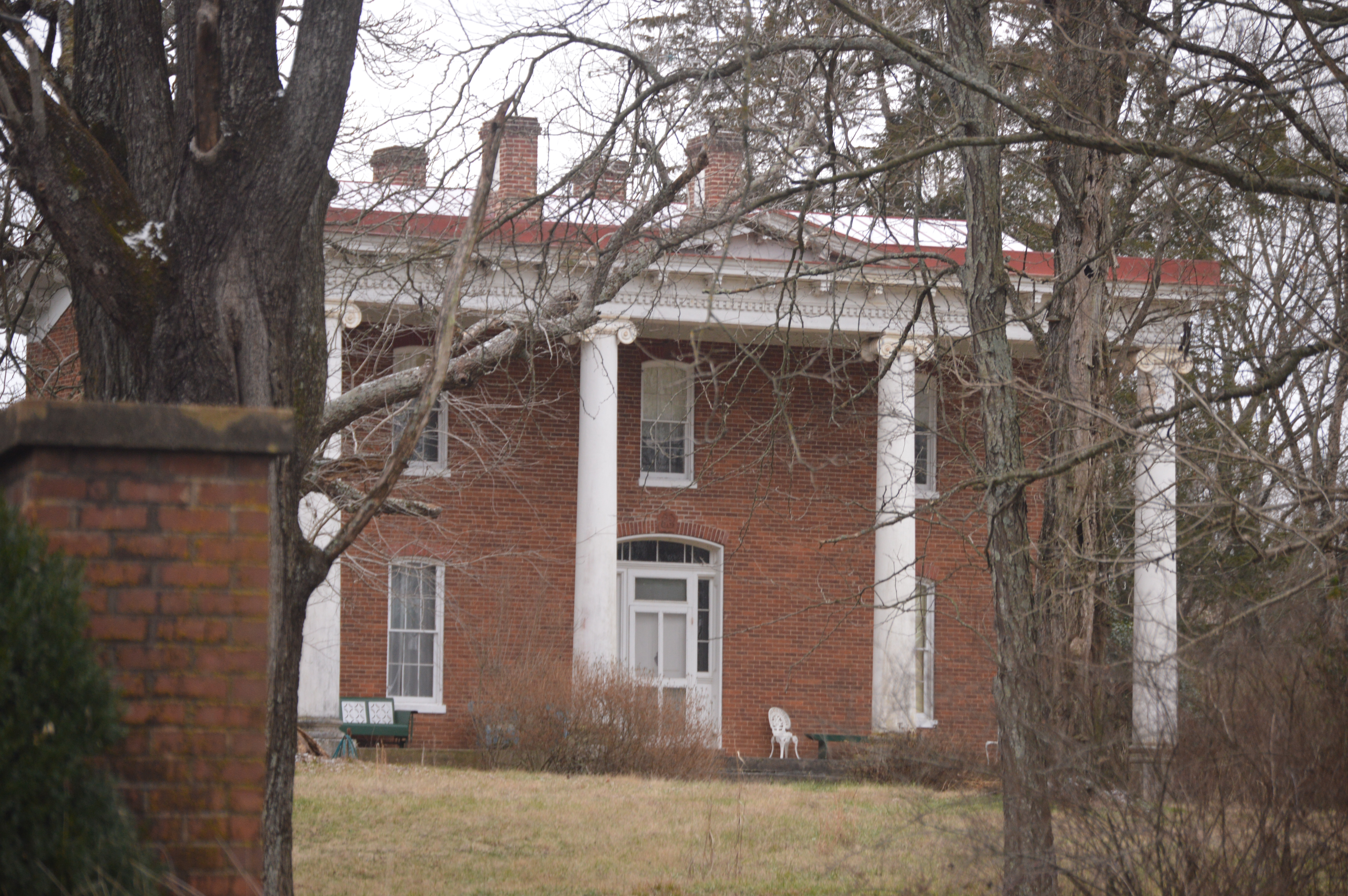
- Facade

- Location within Virginia Location within the United States
- Location: 4256 Bushy Mountain Rd., near Culpeper, Virginia
- Coordinates: 38°20′37″N 77°58′21″W
- Area: 3.5 acres (1.4 ha)
- Built: 1871
- Built by: J.J. Hasley and Samuel S. Proctor; James W. Inskeep
- Architectural style: Italianate
- NRHP reference No.: 99000965
- VLR No.: 068-0131

Significant dates
- Added to NRHP: August 5, 1999
- Designated VLR: June 16, 1999

Lessland is a historic home located near Culpeper in Orange County, Virginia. It was built in 1871, and is a two-story, three-bay, gable roofed brick residence with a rear brick ell in the Italianate style. It has a central passage plan and sits on an English basement. The front facade features a portico with four two-story Ionic order columns and a shallow pediment over the central bay. Also on the property are the contributing law office, an icehouse, a meathouse, and a granary.

It was listed on the National Register of Historic Places in 1999.
