= French Strother =

American politician

Member of the Virginia House of Delegates from the Culpeper County district
- In office October 1, 1776 – September 30, 1792
- Preceded by: Henry Pendleton
- Succeeded by: James Williams

Member of the Virginia Senate from the Spotsylvania, Culpeper and Orange Counties district
- In office October 1, 1792 – July 3, 1799
- Preceded by: Edward Stevens
- Succeeded by: Francis T. Brooke

Personal details
- Born: George French Strother; January 1, 1730 King George County, Virginia, US
- Died: July 3, 1799 (aged 69) Culpeper County, Virginia, US
- Spouse: Lucy Coleman
- Occupation: lawyer, politician, planter

Military service
- Branch/service: Virginia Militia

[George] French Strother (1730— July 3, 1800) was an eighteenth-century planter, politician, lawyer and judge in Virginia, nicknamed "the Fearless" for his fiery rhetoric during debates in the American Revolutionary War.

== Early life ==
Born in King George County, Virginia in 1730, the eldest son of James Lawrence Strother and his wife, the former Margaret French. His great-grandfather William Strother had made a will in Richmond County, Virginia in 1700. Young French Strother moved to Falmouth, Virginia (across the Rappahannock River from Fredericksburg) with his parents as a boy when his father received a job inspecting tobacco for export from the area. When his father died in 1761, French Strother inherited his estate.

== Career ==
He studied law, was admitted to the bar, and practiced law principally in Culpeper County. French Strother lived on a large estate on the Culpeper/Stevensburg Road, owned slaves, and served on the vestry of St. Mark's Parish.(whose history a descendant would write). Strother also served as Presiding Justice of the Culpeper County Court for most of his adult life. His normal honorific of "Colonel" reflects his years of service leading the county militia. He also was one of the trustees of the Stevensburg Academy.

French Strother represented Culpeper County in the Virginia General Assembly for more than 25 years, including in the Virginia Convention of 1776. He was one of Culpeper County's two delegates for 15 years in the Virginia House of Delegates (1776-1792), serving alongside first Birkett Davenport, then Henry Field, Jr., George Weatherall, Henry Hill, Henry Field, James Pendleton (several times), Henry Fry, Joel Early, David Jamison, Jr., and finally William Madison. In 1788 Culpeper county voters elected French Strother to represent them in the Virginia Ratification Convention, where he allied with Patrick Henry and George Mason and voted against the proposed United States Constitution—although the convention as a whole ratified it. Strother was a political opponent of James Madison (before his presidency), and also once defeated by James Monroe.

Beginning in 1791 or 1792 until his death, Culpeper County voters (together with those from neighboring Spotsylvania and Orange Counties) elected Strother to the Virginia Senate, where he served part-time from 1792-1800 (Madison County having been created in the interim and added to the senatorial district in 1794). Francis T. Brooke was elected to succeed him.

== Family ties ==
French Strother married Lucy Coleman (1742–1790) of Caroline County, Virginia. They had two sons, George French Strother (1764-1840) and Daniel French Strother (1783–1840) (both of whom would move to Missouri), as well as five daughters: Margaret French Strother (1763–1849 who married Capt. Philip Slaughter), Lucy Coleman Strother (1767–1778), Mary Strother (1775–1837 who married her first cousin Daniel Gray), Gilly Coleman Strother (1776–1848 who married Col. John Evans), and Elizabeth French Strother (1780–1816 who married Nimrod Evans).

== Death and legacy ==
French Strother died, aged 70, in Fredericksburg on July 3, 1799, on his way home to Culpeper from the Virginia Senate session in Richmond.

The family continued to use his name for years. Several of his descendants became U.S. Congressman, including his son George Strother, who would later move with his family and slaves to Missouri. His grandson James French Strother continued the family's political tradition, and practiced law in Culpeper as well as represented it in the Virginia House of Delegates, becoming its speaker as well as serving as a delegate to the state constitutional convention in 1850, then winning election to the U.S. House of Representatives as a Whig. His great-grandson, also James French Strother (1868-1930) would represent West Virginians in the U.S. House of Representatives (but as a Republican). Another grandson Daniel French Slaughter (1799-1881) would also represent Culpeper County in the Virginia Senate. A descendant, Jane Chapman Slaughter (1860-1951) would become the first woman to receive a PhD. from the University of Virginia, become a noted genealogist, and donated her papers to the University of Virginia Library. Several of French Strother's descendants served in the Confederate States Army during the American Civil war, including C.S.A. Brig. Gen. James E. Slaughter, a VMI graduate who had served with distinction in the Mexican American War, then fought for the Confederacy and claimed never to have surrendered, but fired the last shots of the Confederacy in Texas, crossed into Mexico for years, then made his home in Mobile, Alabama and died in New Orleans, Louisiana.
