= George Strother =

American politician

George F. Strother

Member of the Virginia House of Delegates from the Culpeper district
- In office December 1, 1806 – December 3, 1809 Serving with John Roberts (Culpeper)
- Preceded by: Aylett Hawes
- Succeeded by: Moses Green

Member of the U.S. House of Representatives from Virginia's 10th district
- In office March 4, 1817 – February 10, 1820
- Preceded by: Aylett Hawes
- Succeeded by: Thomas L. Moore

Personal details
- Born: 1783 Stevensburg, Virginia
- Died: November 28, 1840 (aged 56–57) St. Louis, Missouri
- Resting place: Bellefontaine Cemetery
- Party: Democratic-Republican
- Spouse: Sara Green Williams
- Education: College of William and Mary
- Profession: Lawyer, planter, military officer, politician

George French Strother (1783 – November 28, 1840) was a nineteenth-century politician, lawyer and slaveowner in Virginia and Missouri.

== Early life and education ==
Born in Stevensburg, Virginia, to prominent Culpeper County attorney French Strother (1739–1800) and his wife the former Lucy Coleman, George Strother attended the College of William and Mary.

== Virginia political career ==
After studying law, George Strother too was admitted to the bar, and commenced practice in Culpeper County, Virginia. He inherited property (including slaves) when his father died in 1799. In the 1810 federal census, he owned 7 slaves in Culpeper County, and 23 slaves in Falmouth in Stafford County, Virginia, from here his father had moved to Culpeper County but where the family continued to retain property.

George Strother won what once had been his father's seat in the Virginia House of Delegates representing Culpeper County alongside John Roberts (Culpeper) for three single-year terms, 1806–1809. In 1816, the year voters elected fellow Virginian James Monroe president, George Strother was elected to the United States House of Representatives as a Democratic-Republican, where he served from 1817 to 1820. He succeeded fellow Democratic Republican Aylett Hawes, who retired and returned to his medical practice (and whom he had succeeded in the Virginia House of Delegates in 1806). Strother won re-election in 1818 but resigned in February 1820, and his seat lay vacant until fellow Democratic Republican Thomas L. Moore was elected in November.

== Missouri ==
After the Missouri Compromise led to Missouri's admission as a slave state, Strother moved to St. Louis, Missouri, where Strother became receiver of public money.

Strother practiced law in St. Louis for many years. A nephew with the same name caused a sensation by stabbing a fellow lawyer from Virginia named Horatio Cozens to death in the courthouse over a political dispute on behalf of this George Strother. The murderer then fled to Mexico, where he reportedly died.

== Family ==
George French Strother married Sarah Green Williams, daughter of Gen. James Williams, of "Soldier's Rest" in Orange County, Virginia. The couple had two children: Sarah Williams Strother (1810–1885), James French Strother (1811–1860) (and grandfather of another named James French Strother who served in Virginia's Constitutional Convention of 1850). After Sarah died, Strother married Theodosia, daughter of John Hunt, of Lexington, Kentucky, and had two more children, Sallie and John Hunt Strother (1812–1863).

== Death and legacy ==
George Strother died on November 28, 1840. He was originally interred in Christ Church Cemetery and in 1860 was reinterred in Bellefontaine Cemetery.

U.S. House of Representatives
Preceded by Aylett Hawes	Member of the U.S. House of Representatives from Virginia's 10th congressional district March 4, 1817 – February 10, 1820	Succeeded by Thomas L. Moore
