= Cedar Mountain, Virginia =

Mountain in the U.S. state of Virginia

Cedar Mountain
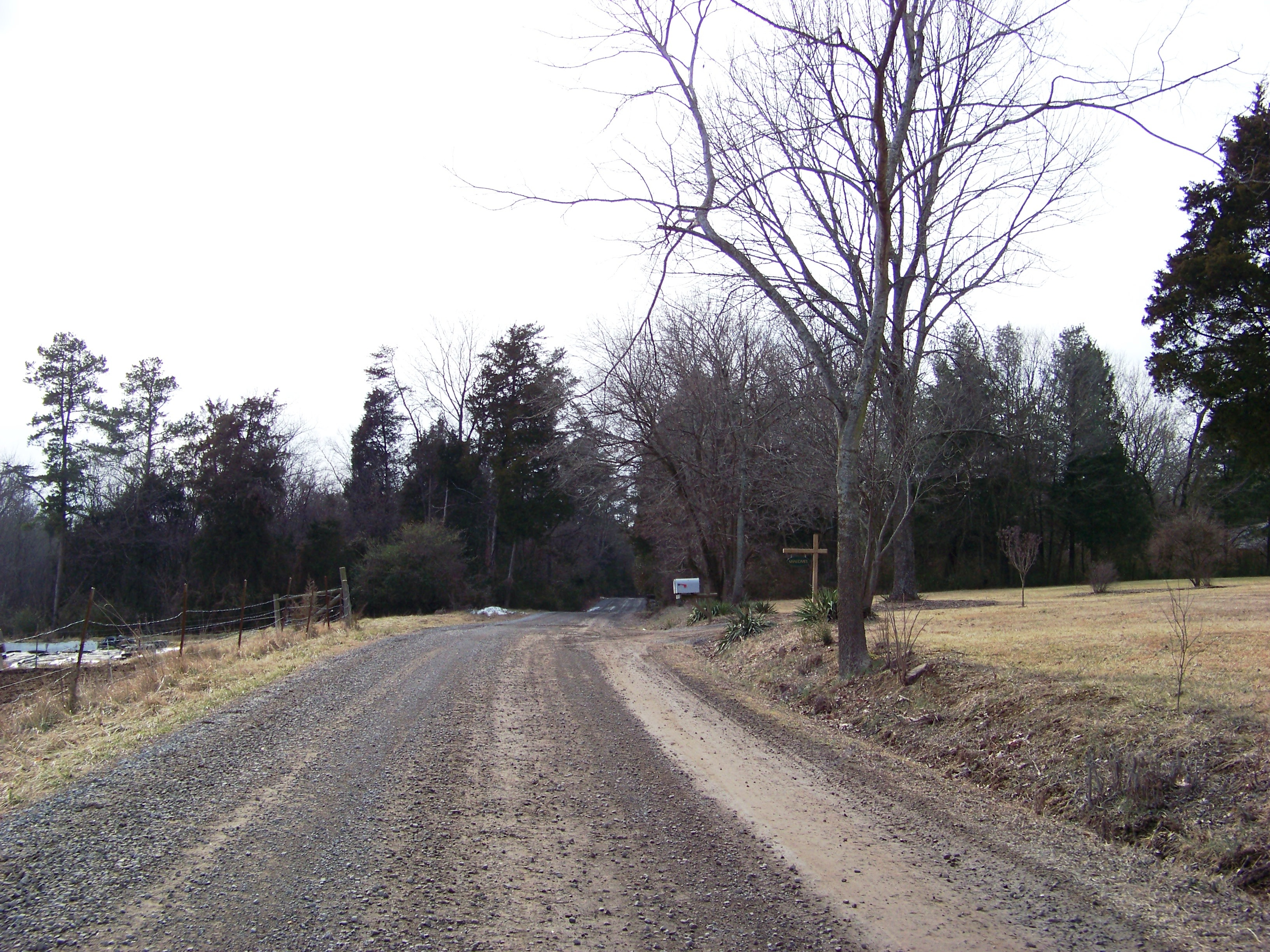
- Along Cedar Mountain near Rapidan

Highest point
- Elevation: 814 ft (248 m)Mountainzone
- Prominence: 400 ft (120 m)
- Coordinates: 38°22′10″N 78°04′17″W

Geography
- Location: Culpeper County, Virginia, U.S.
- Parent range: Piedmont Monadnock
- Topo map: USGS Culpeper

Climbing
- Easiest route: Hike

Cedar Mountain, also known as Slaughter Mountain, is a piedmont monadnock in Culpeper County, Virginia. The 800 feet (240 m) ridge is 7 miles (11 km) south of the town of Culpeper and just to the northwest of the northern tip of the Southwest Mountains at Clark Mountain. The mountain was used as a signal mountain by confederate troops during the Civil War. Remnants of that fortification are still visible today.
