= Battle of Culpeper Court House =

Battle of the American Civil War

Coordinates: 38°28′21.2″N 77°59′35.3″W

- Part of the American Civil War
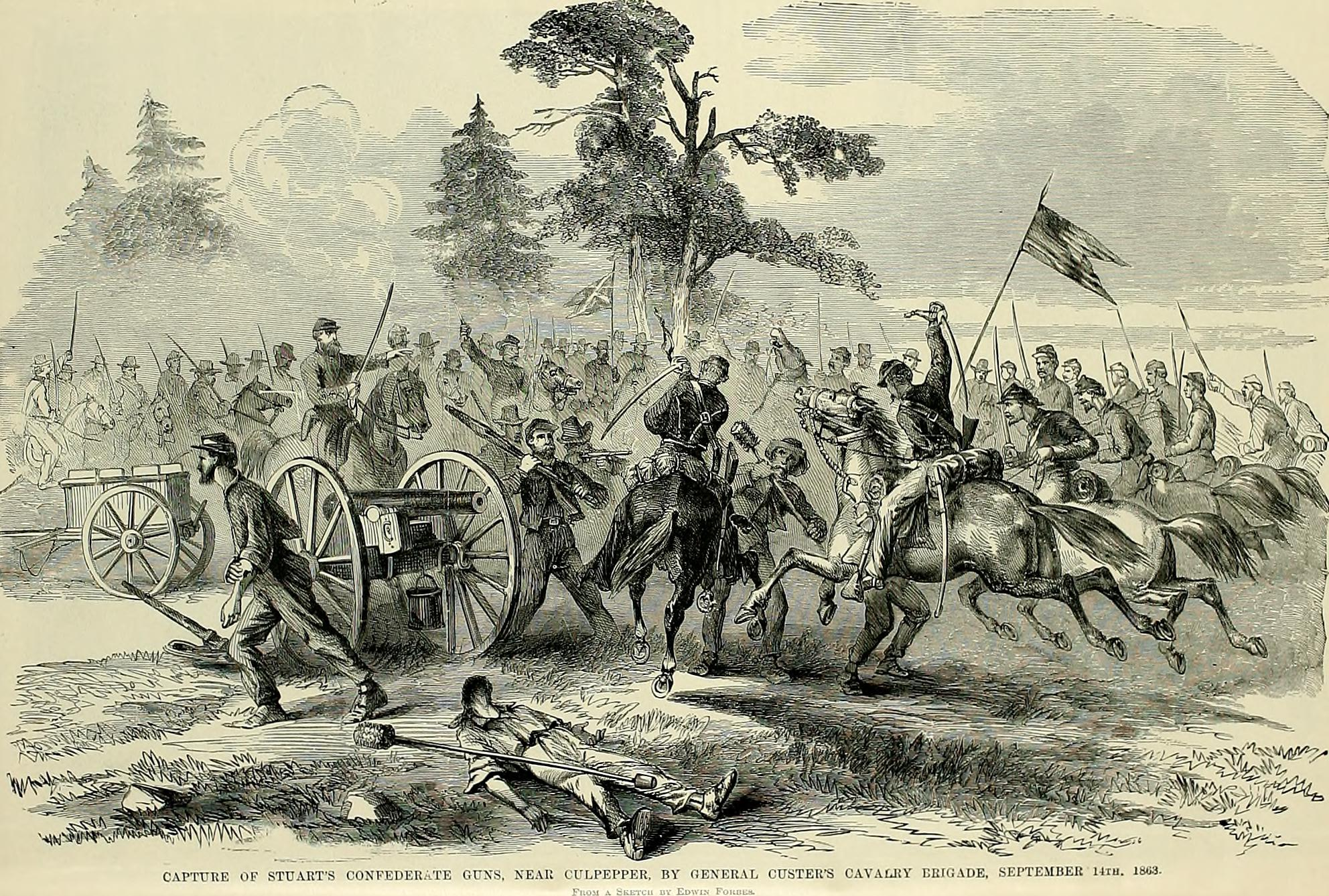
- Custer captures artillery
Date	September 13, 1863
Location	Culpeper Court House, Virginia
Result	Union victory

Belligerents
United States of America	Confederate States of America

Commanders and leaders
Alfred Pleasonton	J.E.B. Stuart

Strength
Cavalry corps of three divisions	Cavalry corps of two divisions

Casualties and losses
NA	Unknown killed and wounded, 100 men taken prisoner

The Battle of Culpeper Court House was an American Civil War skirmish fought September 13, 1863, near Culpeper, Virginia, between the cavalry of the Union Army of the Potomac and that of the Confederate Army of Northern Virginia. The Union victory opened up the Culpeper region to Federal control, a prelude to the subsequent Bristoe Campaign.

== Background ==
On September 12, 1863, the Army of the Potomac's 10,000-man Union cavalry corps under Maj. Gen. Alfred Pleasonton left camp near Warrenton, Virginia, and crossed the Rappahannock River, where various elements concentrated near the hamlet of Sulphur Springs. Their objective was to attack Confederate Maj. Gen. J.E.B. Stuart's headquarters at Culpeper Court House, the seat of Culpeper County.

== Battle ==
At 4 a.m. the following day, Pleasonton's three divisions moved forward nearly two miles, fording the Hazel River and approaching Culpeper. Advancing in three columns, the Union troopers drove off scattered Confederate pickets and skirmishers. Near the main Confederate defensive line at 1 p.m., 1st Division commander Brig. Gen. H. Judson Kilpatrick ordered a mounted charge by the Michigan Brigade of Brig. Gen. George Armstrong Custer, which carried the Confederate position centered at the railroad depot. Custer seized more than 100 prisoners, as well as three artillery pieces. The three columns converged at Culpeper and continued their advance, driving the Confederates towards the Rapidan River in heavy skirmishing. At nightfall, the victorious Federals encamped near Cedar Mountain, with the Confederates across Raccoon Ford on the Rapidan. Maj. Gen. Gouverneur K. Warren's II Corps occupied Culpeper Court House, although his infantry took no part in the cavalry skirmishing. Probing actions the next two days indicated the new Confederate position across the Rapidan was too strong to carry.
