= Francis Vielé-Griffin =

French symbolist poet

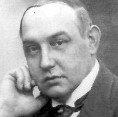
- Born: 26 May 1864; Norfolk, Virginia, US
- Died: 12 November 1937 (aged 73); Bergerac, Dordogne, France
- Occupation: Poet
- Writing career
- Genre: Symbolist

Francis Vielé-Griffin (pseudonym of Egbert Ludovicus Viélé, 26 May 1864 – 12 November 1937), was a French symbolist poet. He was born at Norfolk, Virginia, USA, the son of General Egbert Ludovicus Viele, and moved to France with his mother (the former Teresa Griffin) in 1872.

Vielé-Griffin was educated in France and divided his time between Paris and Touraine. He was a writer of vers libre and founded the highly influential journal Entretiens politiques et littéraires (1890–92). He wrote symbolist and vers-libre poetry. His first collection, Cueille d'avril, appeared in 1885. He practiced a relaxed prosody, which did not take into account the obligatory alternation of masculine and feminine rhymes, the prohibition to rhyme a plural with a singular, replaces the rhyme with an assonance, if not neglected here and there the rhyme or assonancer:

Ne croyez pas
Pour ce qu'avril rit rose
Dans les vergers
Ou palit de l'exces voluptueux des fleurs
Que toutes choses
Sont selon nos gais coeurs
Et qu'il n'est plus une soif a etancher.

== Works ==
His work includes:

- Cueille d'avril (1885) (In English translation: Cull of April, Sunny Lou Publishing: ISBN 978-1-95539-218-1, 2021; April Harvest in April Harvest, Swans, and Joys by Sunny Lou Publishing: ISBN 978-1-95539-285-3, 2026)
- Les Cygnes (1887; new series, 1892) (Swans, in English translation by Sunny Lou Publishing: ISBN 978-1-95539-230-3, 2022; April Harvest, Swans, and Joys by Sunny Lou Publishing: ISBN 978-1-95539-285-3, 2026)
- Ancaeus (1885–87), a dramatic poem
- Joies (1889) (Joys, in English translation by Sunny Lou Publishing: ISBN 978-1-95539-221-1, 2022; April Harvest, Swans, and Joys by Sunny Lou Publishing: ISBN 978-1-95539-285-3, 2026)
- Fleurs du Chemin et Chansons de la Route (1893) ("Flowers of the Path" and "Songs of the Journey" included in The Ride of Yeldis & Other Poems, in English translation by Sunny Lou Publishing: ISBN 978-1-95539-239-6, 2023)
- La Chevauchée d'Yeldis (1893) (The Ride of Yeldis & Other Poems, in English translation by Sunny Lou Publishing: ISBN 978-1-95539-239-6, 2023)
- Swanhilde, a dramatic poem (1894)
- Laus Veneris (1895), a volume of translations from Swinburne
- Poèmes et Poésies (1895), a collection containing much of his earlier work
- Phocas le jardinier (1898)
- La Légende ailee de Wieland le Forgeron (1899), a dramatic poem.
- L'Amour sacré (1903), poems
- Plus loin (1906)
- Voix d'Ionie (1914)
- La Rose au flat (1922)
- Le Livre des reines (1929)

== Quotes ==
From “Euphonies” in April Harvest:

I ramble on return from vain lassitudes,
Have we not dreamt of other beatitudes?

From "Dea" in April Harvest:

The rhythm of her voice is my only metric,
And her alternating pace, my nuanced rhyme;
My idea is what I read in her thought,
Of course, and I have never dreamt of another America
Than to kiss the auburn-gold of her lowered head.
