= John L. Viele =

American politician

John Ludovicus Viele (June 6, 1788 Pittstown, then in Albany Co., now in Rensselaer County, New York – October 19, 1832 Albany, New York) was an American politician from New York.

== Life ==
He was the son of Ludovicus Viele (1742–1800) and Effie (Toll) Viele. On November 18, 1810, he married Kathlyne Knickerbocker (1792–1837), and they had eight children, among them Henry K. Viele (1819–1881), who ran in 1860 for Lt. Gov. of New York; and Gen. and Congressman Egbert Ludovicus Viele (1825–1902).

John L. Viele entered Union College in 1811, but left after a year. Then he studied law, was admitted to the bar in 1812, and practiced in Troy.

He was a member of the New York State Senate (Middle D.) in 1822, elected to a four-year term but legislated out of office by the New York Constitution of 1821.

He was again a member of the State Senate (4th D.) from 1826 to 1829, sitting in the 49th, 50th, 51st and 52nd New York State Legislatures.

On February 6, 1832, Viele was elected by the State Legislature a Regent of the University of the State of New York, but died later the same year.

== Sources ==
- The New York Civil List compiled by Franklin Benjamin Hough (pages 126ff, 145 and 338; Weed, Parsons and Co., 1858)
- Viele genealogy at the Knickerbocker Family site
- Bio of Henry K. Viele transcribed from Our County and Its People - A descriptive work on Erie County, New York by Truman C. White (The Boston History Company, 1898)

New York State Senate
Preceded by John Cramer	New York State Senate; Fourth District (Class 3); 1826–1829	Succeeded by Isaac Gere
