= Mordecai Barbour =

Virginia planter and American Revolutionary War militia officer

- Born: Mordecai Barbour; October 21, 1763; Culpeper County, Virginia
- Died: January 4, 1846 (age 82) "Weston", Boligee, Greene County, Alabama
- Resting place: Bethsalem Cemetery, Boligee, Greene County, Alabama
- Citizenship: United States of America
- Occupations: Culpeper County Militia officer, statesman, planter, and businessperson
- Spouses: Elizabeth Strode; Sally Haskell Byrne
- Children: John Strode Barbour; Frances Barbour Minor; Ann Barbour Gist; Maria Barbour Tillinghast Hogan; Mordecai Barbour
- Parent(s): James Barbour III; Frances Throckmorton
- Relatives: grandfather of: John Strode Barbour, Jr. James Barbour; Alfred Madison Barbour first cousin of: James Barbour; Philip P. Barbour

Mordecai Barbour (October 21, 1763 – January 4, 1846) was a Culpeper County Militia officer during the American Revolutionary War and a prominent Virginia statesman, planter, and businessperson. Barbour was the father of John Strode Barbour, Sr. (August 8, 1790 – January 12, 1855), member of the U.S. House of Representatives from Virginia's 15th congressional district; and the grandfather of John Strode Barbour, Jr. (December 29, 1820 – May 14, 1892), member of the U.S. House of Representatives from Virginia's 8th congressional district and United States Senator; James Barbour (February 26, 1828 – October 29, 1895), prominent Virginia statesman and planter; and Alfred Madison Barbour (April 17, 1829 – April 4, 1866), Superintendent of the Harpers Ferry Armory during John Brown's raid.

== Early life ==
Mordecai Barbour was born on October 21, 1763, in Culpeper County, Virginia, as the eldest son of James Barbour III (1734–1804) and his wife Frances Throckmorton.

== American Revolutionary War ==
During the American Revolutionary War in May or June 1781, Barbour joined the Culpeper County Militia, serving first as a private, then lieutenant under General Mechlenburg. Barbour's first assignment was to protect Rappahannock Forge.

Barbour also served under Captain John Nicholas, Captain John Stewart, and Captain John Woodford and under the command of Gilbert du Motier, marquis de Lafayette. Barbour was with Lafayette at the Battle of Jamestown, then moved onto Williamsburg and Richmond. Barbour also participated in the Siege of Yorktown and conveyed the prisoners to Winchester. Barbour later attained the rank of major.

Following the war, Barbour received a pension for his military service.

== Business ventures ==
=== Fredericksburg ===
Barbour began owning and operating water-powered mills in Culpeper County, two of which were purchased by John Strode. Barbour's manufacturing interests extended from cotton gins to the making of nails. On May 29, 1805, the Virginia Herald carried an advertisement for Barbour's cut nail manufactory in Fredericksburg, Virginia "where they will sell, Cut and wrought Nails, Brads, Springs, Sadler's Tacks of all sizes". Fredericksburg land tax records from 1805 indicate Barbour rented properties owned by John Brownlow and Charles Julian. Records also indicate Barbour acquired a merchants license in 1806 from George W. B. Spooner, Commissioner of Revenue for the District of Fredericksburg, for the sum of $15 (~$309.00 in 2025). Barbour was a resident of Fredericksburg until 1808 when he relocated to Petersburg.

=== Petersburg ===
Prior to his relocation from Fredericksburg, Barbour had previously owned Burlington plantation in Dinwiddie County west of Petersburg and operated a mill in its vicinity. In 1819, the Virginia General Assembly authorized an act permitting Barbour to "receive toll for passing his bridge across the Appomattox river". In addition to the operation of the bridge, Barbour also owned and operated a grist mill four miles from Petersburg on the Appomattox that evolved into an incorporated venture known as the Matoaca Manufacturing Company, which processed grain and manufactured paper and cotton. In 1831, Barbour received a permit for the erection of a 12-feet-wide toll bridge across the Appomattox River at Exeter Mills.

== War of 1812 ==
Following the outbreak of War of 1812, Barbour wrote a letter to United States President James Madison on June 28, 1812, in which he volunteered his services to lead a regiment in the United States military. Barbour stated in his letter to President Madison:

In the present crisis when the insolence pride and rapacity of an unjust and haughty nation has leaped upon our beloved Country such an accumulation of insults wrongs and injustice that the Nation is compelled to resort to arms to recover its own respect and enforce from others the observance of that rule by right which is our inherent birth right—It becomes the duty of every citizen to tender to his Country such services as he is capable to render—Under the influence of such a conviction and believing from the experience I acquired in the Revolutionary War that I can render essential services to my Country. I have caused it to be communicated to the War office my willingness to accept the command of a regiment of those troops now raising by the United States—In the result of my appointment it shall be my glory and my pride to aspire at commanding a regiment which shall surpass all others in its military knowledge—whilst the whole energies of my mind shall be centered to prepare the feelings of my troops, and to inspire them with all that heroic praise that ought to characterize the soldiers of the only free government on Earth—If sir my services are deemed worthy of acceptance twill give me great pleasure to serve my country—whilst at the same time if my Country can be better served by the appointment of some other gentleman twill be to me cause of satisfaction rather than regret—With the highest esteem and coustanation, I have the honor to be

Sir Your Obed. Servt.
Mordecai Barbour

== Marriage and children ==
Barbour married Elizabeth Strode, daughter of John Strode of "Fleetwood" in Culpeper County. John Strode was master of the gun factory near Falmouth, Virginia, which was instrumental in supplying arms to Virginia's troops during the American Revolutionary War. Strode was reportedly of French Huguenot descent.

Barbour and Elizabeth had five children:

- John Strode Barbour (1790–1855) m. Elizabeth A. Byrne
  - John Strode Barbour, Jr. (1820–1892) m. Susan Sewell Daingerfield (1865)
  - James Barbour (1828–1895) m. Fanny Thomas Beckham (1857)
    - Ella B. Barbour Rixey (born 1858) m. John Franklin Rixey (1881)
    - Mary B. Barbour Wallace (born 1860) m. Clarence B. Wallace (1890)
    - James Byrne Barbour (1864–1926)
    - John Strode Barbour (1866–1952) m. Mary B. Grimsley (1894)
    - Edwin Barbour (1868–1902) m. Josie McDonald
    - A. Floyd Barbour (born 1868)
    - Fanny C. Barbour Beckham (born 1874) m. Benjamin Collins Beckham (1899)
  - Alfred Madison Barbour (1829–1866) m. Kate Daniels (1858)
- Frances Barbour Minor m. Henry Minor
- Ann Barbour Gist m. Thomas Gist
- Maria Barbour Tillinghast Hogan m. Colonel Tillinghast, m. J. B. Hogan
- Mordecai Barbour

Following the death of Elizabeth, Barbour married Sally Haskell Byrne. Sally was the widow of James Byrne of Petersburg and the mother of Barbour's daughter-in-law, Elizabeth A. Byrne.

== Death ==
Barbour died at "Weston", the residence of his daughter Frances Barbour Minor, in Boligee, Greene County, Alabama on January 4, 1846. He was interred at Bethsalem Cemetery at Bethsalem Presbyterian Church in Boligee.
