= John Strode Barbour =

John Strode Barbour may refer to:

- John S. Barbour (1790–1855), U.S. Representative from Virginia
- John S. Barbour Jr. (1820–1892), U.S. Senator from Virginia
- John Strode Barbour (1866–1952), American newspaper editor, lawyer, mayor, and statesman

== See also ==
- John Barbour (disambiguation)
