= Jonathan C. Gibson =

American politician (1833–1907)

Jonathan Catlett Gibson Jr.

Member of the Virginia House of Delegates from the Culpeper County district
- In office December 4, 1879 – December 6, 1881
- Preceded by: James Barbour
- Succeeded by: Jacob S. Eggborn

Member of the Virginia House of Delegates from the Culpeper County district
- In office December 5, 1883 – December, 1894
- Preceded by: Jacob S. Eggborn

Personal details
- Born: 1833 Culpeper County, Virginia, U.S.
- Died: January 29, 1907 (aged 73–74) Culpeper, Virginia, U.S.
- Education: University of Virginia
- Occupation: Lawyer, farmer

Military service
- Allegiance: Confederate States of America
- Branch/service: Confederate States Army
- Years of service: 1861-1865
- Rank: Colonel(CSA)
- Unit: 49th Virginia Infantry

Jonathan Catlett Gibson Jr. (1833 – January 29, 1907) was a nineteenth-century Virginia lawyer, farmer and Confederate soldier who represented Fauquier County in the Virginia Constitutional Convention of 1868 and later Culpeper County in the Virginia House of Delegates.

== Early life ==
Gibson was born in Culpeper County, Virginia in 1833 to lawyer Jonathan Catlett Gibson, Sr. (1793-1849) and his second wife Mary Williams Shackleford, one of their five sons who later served in the Confederate States Army. The family was well-off, so that they could afford a private education for their sons. His father owned at least 23 enslaved persons in 1840, the last census during that Gibson's life. Despite his father's death in 1849, this Gibson graduated from the University of Virginia, 1850-51.

Like his father, J.C. Gibson Jr. would marry twice, in this case to Mary Georgia Shackelford in 1870 and to Florence Eastham Daniel in 1901.

== Career ==
The Virginia Capitol at Richmond VA where 19th century Conventions met

His father owned property in Culpeper and nearby Spotsylvania and Rappahannock counties. By 1860, Gibson had settled slightly to the north in nearby Fauquier County, Virginia and farmed. He may have practiced law in Culpeper and nearby counties before as well as after the war.

During the American Civil War, Gibson enlisted an infantry company known as the "Sperryville Rifles", after Sperryville, Rappahannock County, Virginia, and became its captain, with his brother Eustace as quartermaster. After the Sperryville Rifles became Company K of the Confederate 49th Virginia Infantry, Gibson received promotions to major, lieutenant colonel and colonel. His brother Eustace became a captain, and their youngest brother Ned left his studies at the Virginia Military Institute to become a sergeant in the unit before leaving regular army service to work with Mosby's Rangers after Federal troops occupied much of Northern Virginia. This Gibson was reportedly wounded 11 times. His elder brother William St. George Gibson, a lieutenant of the "Little Fork Rangers" in the 4th Virginia Cavalry died at the Battle of Antietam, although his younger brother Eustace recovered from a severe abdominal wound received at the Battle of Gettysburg. Another brother, John W.S. Gibson, would remain a private with Crenshaw's Battery of the Virginia Light Artillery.

Following the war, Gibson returned to farming and the law, though his brothers Eustace and Ned moved to mountainous Giles County, Virginia and Eustace would later moveto Huntington, West Virginia and serve in the West Virginia House of Delegates as well as the U.H. House of Representatives.

In 1867, Fauquier County voters elected Gibson to the Virginia Constitutional Convention of 1868. A Conservative, he was one of two delegates elected from the northern Piedmont constitutional convention district made up of Fauquier and Rappahannock Counties, with fellow Confederate and lawyer R. Taylor Scott being the other.

The 1870 census records J.C. Gibson and his new wife as living at a hotel in Catalpa, the former home of veteran Virginia politician John Strode Barbour, whose sons John Strode Barbour, Jr. and James Barbour would revitalize the Democratic party in Virginia. Culpeper County voters elected Gibson to succeed James Barbour as their representative in the Virginia House of Delegates for the 1879/80 sessions, and then again in 1883/84 when the Conservatives swept both the House of Delegates and state Senate with overwhelming majorities. However, he was displaced for one term by Republican (and former Culpeper Sheriff) Jacob S. Eggborn, before Culpeper's voters returned this Gibson to the House of Delegate in 1889/90. Gibson won re-elected to the sessions of 1891/92 and 1893/94 during the Populist and Jim Crow era.

== Personal life ==
Gibson had a son, Edwin H. He died on January 29, 1907, in Culpeper.

== Bibliography ==
- Pulliam, David Loyd (1901). The Constitutional Conventions of Virginia from the foundation of the Commonwealth to the present time. John T. West, Richmond. ISBN 978-1-2879-2059-5.
- Swem, Earl Greg (1918). A Register of the General Assembly of Virginia, 1776-1918, and of the Constitutional Conventions. David Bottom, Superintendent of Public Printing. ISBN 978-1-3714-6242-0.
