= John Barbour =

John Barbour may refer to:

- John Barbour (poet) (1316–1395), Scottish poet
- John Barbour (MP for New Shoreham), MP for New Shoreham 1368–1382
- John Barbour (footballer) (1890–1916), Scottish footballer
- John S. Barbour (1790–1855), U.S. congressman from Virginia
- John S. Barbour Jr. (1820–1892), his son, also a politician from Virginia
- John Strode Barbour (1866–1952), American newspaper editor, lawyer, mayor, and statesman
- John Barbour (actor) (1933–2026), Canadian-born broadcaster and television personality in the United States
- Sir Milne Barbour (John Milne Barbour, 1868–1951), Northern Irish politician
- John Barbour, founder of Barbour (company), a British manufacturer of outerwear
- John Baxter Barbour Jr. (1862–1929), president of Pittsburgh Stock Exchange
- John Dougherty Barbour (1824–1901), Irish industrialist and politician
- John C. Barbour (1895–1962), American politician in New Jersey

== See also ==
- John Strode Barbour (disambiguation)
