= Perry J. Eggborn =

American politician (1817–1866)

Member of the Virginia House of Delegates from the Culpeper County district
- In office December 5, 1853 – June 1, 1865 Serving with Henry Shackleford; Thomas N. Welch
- Preceded by: James Barbour (lawyer)
- Succeeded by: James Barbour (lawyer)

Personal details
- Born: November 1, 1817 Culpeper County, Virginia, U.S.
- Died: June 29, 1866 (aged 48) Rixeyville, Virginia, U.S.
- Occupation: farmer, politician

Perry Jackson Eggborn (November 1, 1817 – June 29, 1866) was a plantation owner, two-term member of the Virginia House of Delegates and judge in Culpeper County.

== Biography ==
The firstborn son of George Eggborn (1796–1848) and his wife Amy Ann McQueen (1801–1835), the family moved to Culpeper county in 1820. About two years later his brother Jacob S. Eggborn was born, who would be elected the county' sheriff by 1860. The family also included at least two and maybe four daughters, including Martha Ann Perry (1819–1887) and Elizabeth Frances (1821–1899) who survived the Civil War.

Perry Eggborn married Lucy Little (who died before the Civil War), with whom he had a son, William Hugh Eggborn (1844–1923). Like his uncle Jacob, William Eggborn would marry into Culpeper County's Burgess family (descended from William Burgess of Richmond County) after the Civil War.

In addition to farming, Perry J. Eggborn was the postmaster of Eldorado in Culpeper County at least beginning in 1842 and 1844. In 1850, he was among investors in the Hazel River Canal Company (which tried to make that river navigable to the Rappahannock Canal), and four years later also invested in the El Dorado Turnpike Company (to connect the Rappahannock Turnpike with Culpeper Courthouse).

Eggborn built a house near Rixeyville, Virginia in 1852. He owned about 15 slaves in the 1850 census, and more in the 1860 census, which only listed him and his son William as a household, stating that they owned $10,000 in real estate and $20,000 in personal property (including slaves). William Eggborn enlisted as a private in the Confederate 7th Virginia Infantry under Captain J.C. Porter during the American Civil War. He was a courier, chief wagon master and (after 1863) at general J. E. Johnston's headquarters.

After the Civil War, Perry Eggborn became a local judge. Although he died shortly thereafter, Eggborn came to support the Republicans, in part because of financial mismanagement by local officeholders with respect to the Hazel canal (such as paying former delegate George Ficklin's estate more for damage to his races and dam in 1853 than he had recently paid for them).

Perry Eggborn's gravesite is not recorded. In part because of his brother Jacob Eggborn's strong support of Republican Rutherford B. Hayes in the presidential election of 1876, a post office was established called Eggbornsville, Virginia on August 22, 1877, at the Eggborn Brothers store. However, the first postmaster was not an Eggborn, but rather William F. Kyle. William Hugh Eggborn's sons Jacob A. ("Army") Eggborn and Edward J. Eggborn took over the postmastership in 1885 (during the Democratic administration of Grover Cleveland), and William H. Eggborn succeeded them in 1900. That post office closed in 1915, but the Eggborn store continued operating until 1934.
