= James Barbour (lawyer) =

Confederate Army officer and american politician

Member of the Virginia House of Delegates from the Culpeper County, Virginia district
- In office January 12, 1852 – December 4, 1853
- Preceded by: John S. Barbour Jr.
- Succeeded by: Perry J. Eggborn
- In office December 7, 1857 – September 46 1863
- Preceded by: Perry J. Eggborn
- Succeeded by: John H. Rixey
- In office December 5, 1877 – December 3, 1879
- Preceded by: T. B. Nalle
- Succeeded by: Jonathan C. Gibson

Personal details
- Born: James Barbour; February 26, 1828 Catalpa, Virginia, US
- Died: October 29, 1895 (aged 67) Clover Hill, Virginia, US
- Resting place: Fairview Cemetery, Culpeper, Virginia
- Citizenship: United States; Confederate States of America
- Party: Democratic Party
- Spouse: Fanny Thomas Beckham
- Relations: John S. Barbour, Jr.(brother); James Barbour (cousin); Philip P. Barbour (cousin)
- Children: 7, including John Strode Barbour
- Parent: John S. Barbour (father)
- Education: Georgetown College; University of Virginia
- Occupation: lawyer, politician, planter, military officer, newspaper editor

Military service
- Allegiance: Confederate States of America
- Branch/service: Confederate States Army
- Years of service: 1861-1863
- Rank: Major(CSA)
- Unit: staff of Gen. Richard S. Ewell

James Barbour (February 26, 1828 – October 29, 1895) was a Virginia lawyer, planter, politician and Confederate officer. He represented Culpeper County, Virginia, in the Virginia General Assembly, as well as in the Virginia Constitutional Convention of 1850 and the Virginia secession convention of 1861. Barbour also served among Virginia's delegates to the 1860 Democratic National Convention, and as a major in the Confederate States Army during the American Civil War.

== Early life and education ==
Barbour was born on February 26, 1828, at Catalpa in Culpeper County, Virginia. Among the First Families of Virginia, his family had been prominent in the area since colonial times, when his namesake great-grandfather (and grandfather) settled in Virginia's Piedmont region. He was among the sons of John S. Barbour, Member of the U.S. House of Representatives from Virginia's 15th congressional district, and his wife Ella A. Byrne.

Barbour attended Georgetown College from September through December 1840. and then the University of Virginia School of Law between 1841 and 1842. Barbour read law under John Tayloe Lomax in Fredericksburg, Virginia, and was admitted to the Virginia bar in 1844.

== Early political career ==
In 1850, voters from the central Piedmont district that combined Culpeper County, as well as Greene, Madison and Orange Counties elected Barbour among their three delegates to the Virginia Constitutional Convention of 1850, along with Robert A. Banks and John Woolfolk.

In the decade before the American Civil War, Culpeper county's voters elected James Barbour to the Virginia House of Delegates for the 1852–1853 session (where he succeeded his brother John S. Barbour, Jr. to the part-time position). However, voters selected Perry J. Eggborn in the next two elections. Barbour resumed the seat during the 1857–58 session, and was re-elected to the 1859–60 and 1861 (January) sessions. By the 1860 census, James Barbour owned 13 slaves and also hired two older slaves to assist with his plantation while he practiced law.

Barbour was among the delegates representing Virginia at the 1860 Democratic National Convention in Baltimore, Maryland. A year later, Barbour became Culpeper County's delegate at the 1861 Virginia secession convention.

== Marriage and children ==
Barbour married Fanny Thomas Beckham, daughter of Coleman Coals Beckham and his wife Mary C. Beckham, on September 1, 1857. They had seven children:

- Ella B. Barbour Rixey (born February 27, 1858) m. John Franklin Rixey (1881)
- Mary B. Barbour Wallace (born 1860) m. Clarence B. Wallace (1890)
- James Byrne Barbour (1864–1926)
- John Strode Barbour (August 10, 1866 – May 6, 1952) m. Mary B. Grimsley (1894)
- Edwin Barbour (January 2, 1868 – March 5, 1902) m. Josie McDonald
- A. Floyd Barbour (born July 1868)
- Fanny C. Barbour Beckham (born January 1874) m. Benjamin Collins Beckham (1899)

Barbour and his family lived at Beauregard near Brandy Station in Culpeper County, Virginia.

== American Civil War ==
During the American Civil War, Culpeper County voters again elected James Barbour to the Virginia House of Delegates; he served during the sessions 1861/62, 1862 (April), 1862 (September), and 1863 (January). However, John H. Rixey succeeded him for the session which began on September 7, 1863.

After Virginia's secession, Barbour volunteered to serve in the Confederate States Army and was commissioned as a major on the staff of General Richard S. Ewell, where he served as an assistant adjutant general. After a dispute with General Jubal Anderson Early, Barbour resigned on January 30, 1863. Other sources cite ill health as Barbour's reason for resigning.

About six months later, the Battle of Brandy Station, perhaps the largest cavalry engagement of the conflict, took place on and around the Barbour family's estate. Beauregard mansion is now colloquially known as the Graffiti House because it contains graffiti inscribed both Union Army and Confederate States Army soldiers.

== Later life ==
After the war, Barbour acquired a controlling interest in the Richmond Daily Enquirer and Examiner on July 15, 1867, and became its editor. Barbour owned the newspaper until January 30, 1870, when it was acquired by interests affiliated with the Pennsylvania Railroad.

In 1877, Barbour returned to the Virginia House of Delegates, succeeding his relative Thomas B. Nalle for one term, after which fellow Confederate veterans Jonathan C. Gibson or Jacob S. Eggborn held the seat. In 1885, Culpeper's delegate Daniel A. Grimsley resigned and Barbour returned to the remainder of the session (March 1887) and then won election again for 1887/1888 session.

== Death ==
Barbour died of pneumonia at Clover Hill near Jeffersonton in Culpeper County, Virginia on October 29, 1895.

== Bibliography ==
- Pfanz, Donald C. (1998). Richard S. Ewell: A Soldier's Life. University of North Carolina Press, Chapel Hill. ISBN 978-0-8078-2389-7.
- Pulliam, David Loyd (1901). The Constitutional Conventions of Virginia from the foundation of the Commonwealth to the present time. John T. West, Richmond. ISBN 978-1-2879-2059-5.
- Swem, Earl Greg (1918). A Register of the General Assembly of Virginia, 1776-1918, and of the Constitutional Conventions. David Bottom, Superintendent of Public Printing. ISBN 978-1-3714-6242-0.
