= Alfred Madison Barbour =

American lawyer

Member of the Virginia House of Delegates from the Monongalia County district
- In office December 7, 1857 – March 1861 Serving with A. G. Davis
- Preceded by: William Lantz
- Succeeded by: Andrew Brown

Personal details
- Born: Alfred Madison Barbour; April 17, 1829 Culpeper County, Virginia, US
- Died: April 4, 1866 (aged 36) Montgomery, Alabama, US
- Resting place: Fairview Cemetery, Culpeper, Virginia
- Citizenship: United States; Confederate States of America
- Party: Democratic Party
- Spouse: Kate Daniels
- Relations: brother of John S. Barbour, Jr. first cousin once removed of James Barbour and Philip P. Barbour
- Parent(s): John S. Barbour; Ella A. Byrne
- Education: University of Virginia; Harvard University
- Occupation: lawyer, politician, soldier

Military service
- Allegiance: Confederate States of America
- Branch/service: Virginia Militia; Confederate States Army
- Rank: Major(CSA)

Alfred Madison Barbour (April 17, 1829 – April 4, 1866) was a Virginia lawyer, one-term delegate in the Virginia House of Delegates and also in the Virginia Secession Convention of 1861. He may be best known for his role as Superintendent of the Harpers Ferry Armory in Harpers Ferry, Virginia (now West Virginia) during John Brown's raid.

Although Barbour voted against secession, he became a major in the Confederate States Army and served as a quartermaster during the American Civil War.

== Early life ==
Barbour was born on April 17, 1829, on a plantation in Culpeper County, Virginia. He was the son of John S. Barbour, Member of the U.S. House of Representatives from Virginia's 15th congressional district, and his wife Ella A. Byrne, and had several siblings.

Barbour attended the University of Virginia and Harvard Law School.

== Government service ==
Returning to Virginia, Barbour moved to the state's northwest corner. Monongalia County voters once elected him as one of their two representatives in the Virginia House of Delegates, where he served in 1857–1858.

In January 1859, he was appointed as Superintendent at the federal armory in Harpers Ferry, Virginia (now West Virginia). He served there until the American Civil War began in 1861. In October 1859, abolitionist John Brown raided the arsenal. Brown's raiders captured the entire armory and town, which Brown knew to be minimally guarded by civilians, although ultimately he failed and was captured because he remained in town too long. Barbour wrote that he was visiting the federal armory at Springfield, Massachusetts. "Had I been here, I could have done no good. Old Brown would have taken Gen. Scott if he had been here. A military man could have done nothing more than a civilian, unless there had been a corps of soldiers under him... It is ridiculous to talk about it, as if the presence of a military man [at Harper's Ferry] would have awed Old Brown."

Despite the fiasco, voters from Jefferson County elected Barbour and fellow former delegate Logan Osburn to represent them in the Virginia Secession Convention of 1861. While Osburn resolutely voted against secession on both April 4 and April 17, Barbour switched his vote, voting on April 17 to secede, as did his brother James Barbour, who was a delegate representing their native Culpeper County.

== American Civil War ==
During the American Civil War, Barbour served in the Confederate States Army as a quartermaster, on the staff of Joseph E. Johnston as well as Leonidas Polk. By December 1861, he had been promoted to quartermaster of all the Confederate armies, but complaints soon arose that he failed to settle accounts, gambled extensively and managed loosely. Major Barbour served in Meridian, Mississippi and by 1864 was demoted to assistant quartermaster in Montgomery, Alabama, where he remained after the war ended, although paroled in Greensboro. Jubal Anderson Early disliked Barbour, who termed him "not energetic or efficient."

== Death ==
Alfred Madison Barbour died on April 4, 1866, in Montgomery, Alabama.
