= Rapidan River =

River in the United States of America

Coordinates: 38.36815°N 77.6185°W

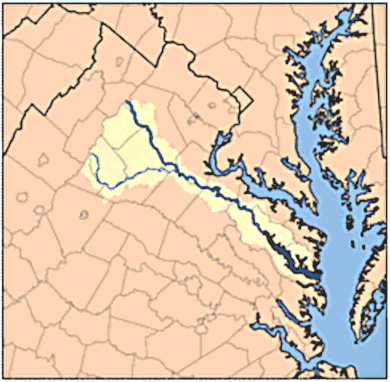
The Rapidan and Rappahannock Rivers. The Rappahannock is the highlighted river to the north, while the Rapidan is its southerly tributary.

The Rapidan River, flowing 88 miles (142 km) through north-central Virginia in the United States, is the largest tributary of the Rappahannock River. The two rivers converge just west of the city of Fredericksburg. The Rapidan River begins west of Doubletop Mountain in Shenandoah National Park where the Mill Prong meets the Laurel Prong at Rapidan Camp, approximately 3 miles (4.8 km) south of Big Meadows. The river defines the border of Orange County with Culpeper and Madison Counties as well as portions of Greene and Madison Counties.

Sections of the lower Rapidan River are preserved by a conservation easement.

The Rapidan River was the scene of severe fighting in the American Civil War, and historic sites such as Ely's Ford, Chancellorsville, Brandy Station, Kelly's Ford, and the Battle of the Wilderness are nearby.

The name is a combination of the word "rapids" with the name of Queen Anne of England. Originally, it was known as the Rapid Ann River.

The Rapidan River ranks #38 in Trout Unlimited's Guide to America's 100 Best Trout Streams. In 2000, the upper Rapidan River was nominated for EPA designation as a Tier III Exceptional Waterway. In 2001, the Virginia Department of Environmental Quality rejected the application, citing uncertainty about the impact of the designation.

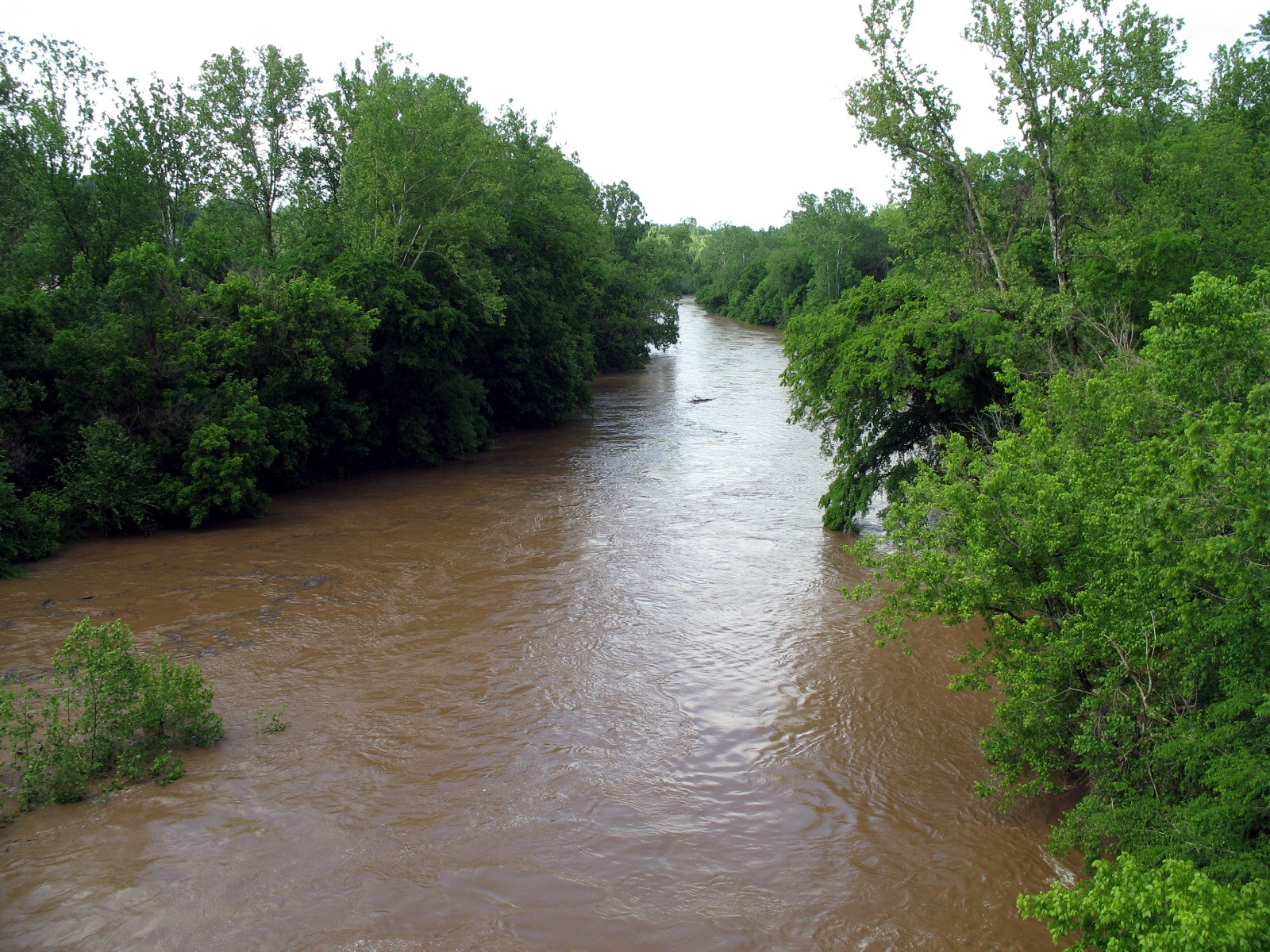
Germanna Ford, Rapidan River

== Trails ==
- Mill Prong Trail to Rapidan, 3.6 miles (5.8 km) - Enjoyable hike to Rapidan Camp. The trail starts high in the Blue Ridge Mountains (3,200 ft) on Skyline Drive, goes southeast 1.8 miles (2.9 km) to the headwaters of the Rapidan River and returns to the point of origin. Note: This trail will not take you to the Rapidan Canal of the Rappahannock Navigation.
- Shenandoah National Park - Rapidan Loop, 7.4 miles (11.9 km) - The trail starts high in the Blue Ridge Mountains (3,200 ft) on Skyline Drive and loops, following the Mill Prong and Laurel Prong and includes the confluence of the two prongs. The Rapidan River is formed at the confluence. Note: This trail will not take you to the Rapidan Canal of the Rappahannock Navigation.

== See also ==
- List of rivers of Virginia
