= Clover Hill (Culpeper, Virginia) =

Plantation house in Virginia, U.S.

Coordinates: 38°26′51″N 77°54′53″W

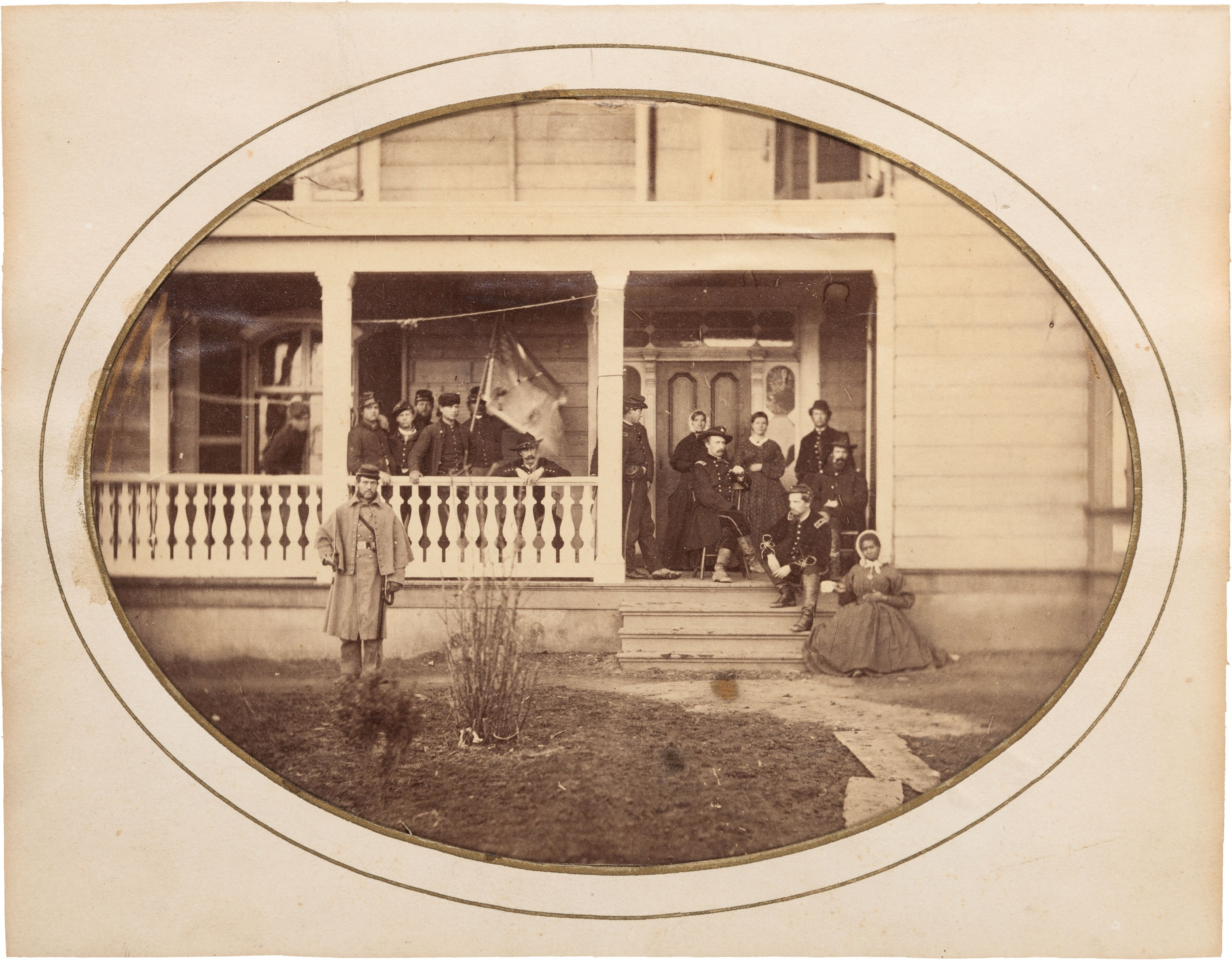
General Custer and staff at Clover Hill, 1864

Clover Hill is a decaying 18th-century plantation house near Culpeper in Culpeper County, Virginia. Clover Hill is best known for serving as the headquarters for Brigadier General George Armstrong Custer during the American Civil War. Clover Hill was home to James Barbour, a prominent American lawyer, planter, delegate from Virginia to the 1860 Democratic National Convention, delegate to the 1861 Virginia secession convention, and a major in the Confederate States Army during the American Civil War.

== History ==
The house at Clover Hill was constructed in 1775.

During the American Civil War, Clover Hill was used by Brigadier General George Armstrong Custer as his headquarters. Custer and his new bride Elizabeth "Libbie" Bacon honeymooned at Clover Hill during the Winter of 1864. Custer named his encampment "Camp Libbie" in his bride's honor.

== Architecture ==
Clover Hill exhibits a steeply pitched, gabled roof with false dormers and arched windows. Clover Hill is clad in a tongue and groove siding. The home's architect is unknown.
