= Barbour House =

Coordinates: 38°50′39.5″N 77°18′26.5″W

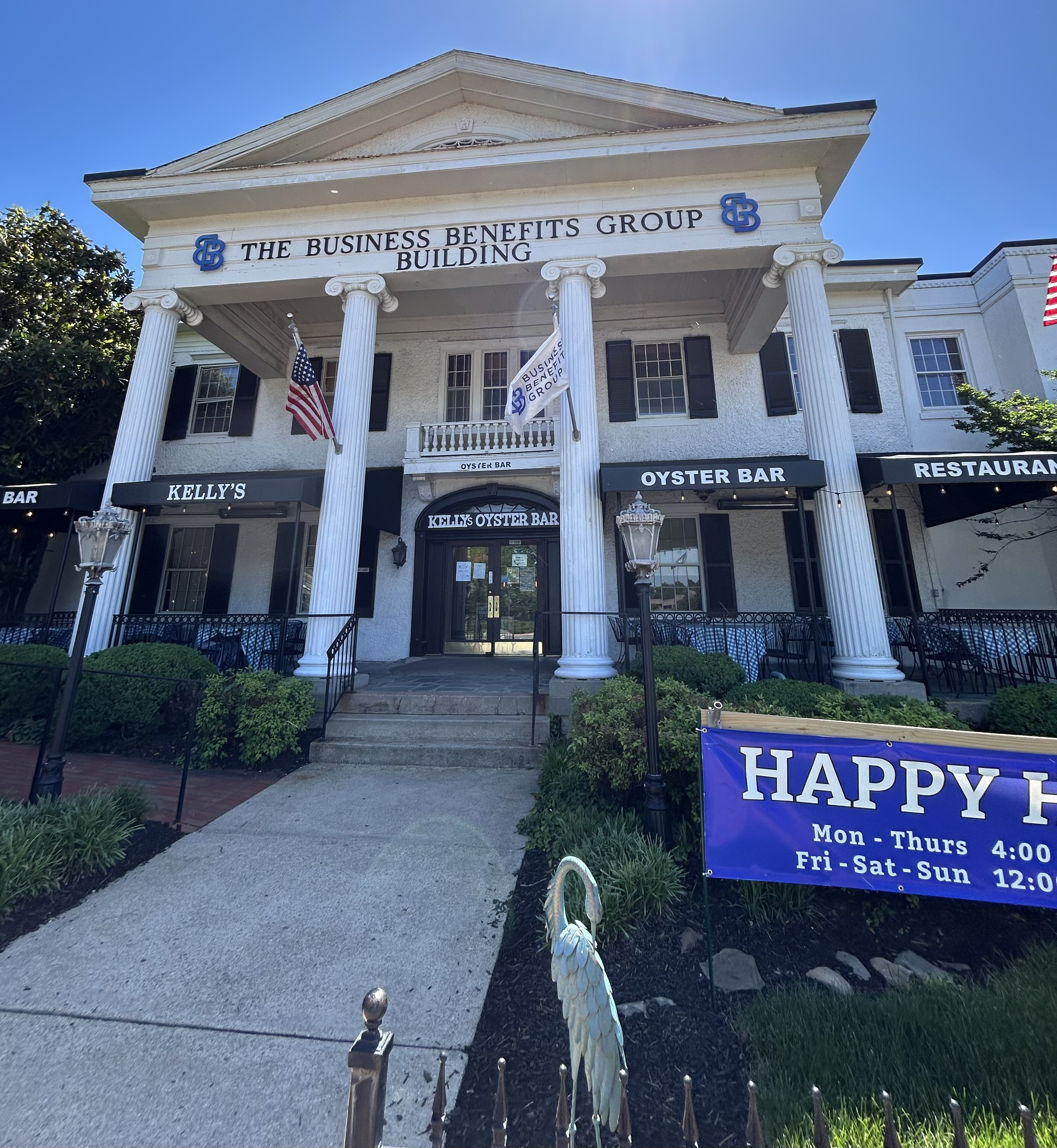
Barbour House in 2025

The Barbour House is an early 20th-century mansion in Fairfax, Virginia, United States. It takes its name from its prominent owner, John Strode Barbour. Barbour House is located at 4069 Chain Bridge Road.

== History ==
Barbour House was the residence of John Strode Barbour, a prominent American newspaper editor, lawyer, mayor, and statesman. Barbour was a scion of the Barbour political family. During the Barbours' ownership, the Barbour House was the center of Fairfax social life.

When the estate of Barbour's widow, Mary B. Grimsley Barbour, was in administration, the Barbour House was being scheduled for demolition so that the property could be developed. McCandlish and Lillard law firm bought the house and moved it to a parcel of the estate fronting on Payne Street (which was renamed Chain Bridge Road). William Patram, a well-known building mover, transported Barbour House 100 yards to its new site.
