= Rapidan Dam Canal of the Rappahannock Navigation =

- Rapidan Dam Canal of the Fredericksburg Navigation
- U.S. National Register of Historic Places
- U.S. National Historic Landmark
- Virginia Landmarks Register
- Location within Virginia Location within the United States
- Location: Spotsylvania County, Virginia
- Nearest city: Fredericksburg, Virginia
- Coordinates: 38°21′28″N 77°36′40″W
- Built: 1829, rebuilt 1845
- Architect: John Couty
- NRHP reference No.: 73002063
- VLR No.: 088-0137

Significant dates
- Added to NRHP: July 26, 1973
- Designated VLR: June 19, 1973

The Rapidan Dam Canal of the Rappahannock Navigation is a canal intended to safely carry Batteaus, sturdy flat-bottomed boats used primarily for transporting cargo, around the rapids at the confluence of the Rappahannock and Rapidan Rivers. The Rapidan Canal, funded and constructed by The Rappahannock Company, consists of two different canals (the Old Rapidan Canal and the Rapidan Canal) built at different times. All of the Rappahannock Navigation, of which the Rapidan Canal is a part, is located in the Piedmont region of Virginia. The Confluence, the name used on maps of the day and sometimes maps of today to denote where the two rivers meet, is located where the borders of the Virginia Counties of Spotsylvania, Stafford and Culpeper meet but is owned by the City of Fredericksburg, Virginia. The Rapidan Canal was listed on the Virginia Landmarks Register (VLR) on June 19, 1973, and on the National Register of Historic Places on July 26, 1973.

== History ==
Construction of the original Rapidan Canal, sometimes referred to as the "Old Rapidan Canal," started on the north bank of the Rappahannock River in the 1830s, fell into disrepair during the mid- and late 1830s and was abandoned entirely in the 1840s when construction of the new canal on the south bank was complete and the new canal serviceable.

=== The Rappahannock Company ===
The history of the entire Rappahannock Navigation, of which the Rapidan Canal was a part, is really the story of the Rappahannock Company. Organized in 1816, The Rappahannock Company sought to build a navigable, 50-mile system of dams and locks on the Rappahannock River and the lower part of the Rapidan River to facilitate the movement of commercial goods between Fredericksburg and the furthest reaches of the navigation. Early investors were primarily Fredericksburg merchants and the Common Council of the Corporation of Fredericksburg (City of Fredericksburg) who wanted Fredericksburg's port to compete as a major shipping port. However, potential canal users on the upper reaches of the planned navigation were reluctant to invest or otherwise support the Company unless work had started on a stretch of canal that would serve their immediate interests.

The Rappahannock Company had started plans for the Rappahannock Navigation as early as 1816, "...but a national recession and the promoter's inability to raise funds delayed actual construction until early 1829" and only ten miles of the originally planned navigation were completed before the project was abandoned. However, beginning in 1845, the Rappahannock Company restarted the effort. Existing components of the Rappahannock Navigation, deteriorated from poor or nonexistent maintenance and damaged by floods and ice, were rebuilt or abandoned and the remainder of the originally planned 50-mile navigation was completed in 1849.

The Rappahannock Company failed in 1853 and the navigation was abandoned entirely by 1855 since it was no longer profitable, if it ever had been, and because of the encroachment of newer, faster, and cheaper rail transportation provided by the Orange and Alexandria Railroad. "...[T]he company had no money left for maintenance or repairs, to say nothing of retiring the huge construction debt, which had reached nearly $450,000...[and] the failing company was turned over to its largest stockholder, the Common Council of the Corporation of Fredericksburg, on July 1, 1852."

== General ==
=== Rapidan Dam ===
The Rapidan Dam, the longest dam on the Rappahannock River, was made of wood and dammed both the Rappahannock River and the Rapidan River. Although the dam is in ruins parts of it are still visible. When the river is low, a line of pins driven into the river bed that anchored wooden timbers to bedrock are visible.

=== Old Rapidan Canal ===
The Old Rapidan Canal is the "... only canal remaining of the unsuccessful, abandoned effort to build the Rappahannock Navigation in the 1830s." Its guard lock was on the north side of the Rapidan Dam, and the canal was short with two locks near its end. The locks were a crib like construct made entirely of wood and filled with stone.

Original plans, recommended by the Virginia Board of Public Works, called for the canal to start on the south side of the Rapidan Dam (its final location) so that boats could safely access the canal. The engineers of the Rappahannock Company, determined to save costs, built the canal on the north side of the dam. Therefore, boats approaching from the Rapidan had to make a dangerous crossing above the dam.

"The other cost-cutting measure which was to plague the company was the use of wooden rather than stone locks - cheaper at first, but more costly in the long run as they decayed and required rebuilding."

=== Rapidan Canal ===
The Rapidan Canal was longer than the Old Rapidan Canal and included a series of five locks "The Rapidan Dam Canal parallels the Rappahannock River from the mouth of the Rapidan River for one and one half miles and then reenters the river through three locks. The Rapidan Canal began on the south side of the Rapidan Dam.

=== Locks of the Rapidan Canal ===
Locks of the Rappahannock Navigation are numbered from where the Rappahannock empties into the Chesapeake Bay and increase incrementally travelling upstream; guard locks are not numbered. Therefore, lock numbers of the Rapidan Canal range from six (the lowest lock) to nine (the most upstream lock), inclusive, with a guard lock at the upstream end of the canal. The table below contains more specific information about the particulars of each lock.

Locks of the Rapidan Canal
Lock	Construction	Lift (ft)	Distance from Previous Lock	State Historical Registration	Lat/Long	Image
Guard	stone in mortar	0	0	44SP78		
9	granite in cement and bedrock	9.2	.8 miles	44SP80		
8	flagstone in mortar	6.75	1 mile	44SP7		
7	granite in mortar	6.75	200 ft	44SP6		
6	flagstone in mortar	6.75	200 ft	44SP5		

==== Guard Lock ====
The guard lock is situated at the upriver end of the canal at The Confluence. From the guard lock to Lock 9 was a tow embankment that closely paralleled the river. The tow embankment was protected by a long and massive stone wall, much of which is still visible today.

==== Lock Nine ====
Lock 9, the most well preserved of the Rapidan Canal locks, was built into a bluff and is the most unusual on the river because the north lock chamber is solid masonry.

Below lock 9 is a power-line right of way, which crosses the river at a right angle to the canal, incidentally affording a view of the site of the wooden locks that were the Old Rapidan Canal - perhaps the only place where the original canals of the 1830s have remained undisturbed and were not reconstructed in 1847. This part of the canal passes through the U.S. Gold Mine fields, and in fact there are two mine adits in the canal bed, leading into the hillside. These were apparently made after the demise of the canal. A few yards below the adits is the old road to the U.S. ford, and the sluice gate and the foundations of a mill.

== Literature ==
- News and Notes: Rappahannock River Canal, 1816-60 (PDF), vol. 16, The Fauquier Historical Society, 1994, archived from the original (PDF) on May 5, 2010
- Trout, W. E. (1992), The Rappahannock Scenic River Atlas, Virginia Canals and Navigations Society
