= 49th Virginia Infantry Regiment =

- Flag of Virginia, 1861
- Active: July 1861 – April 1865
- Disbanded: April 1865
- Country: Confederacy
- Allegiance: Confederate States of America
- Branch: Confederate States Army
- Type: Infantry
- Nickname(s): "Extra Billy" Smith's Boys
- Engagements: American Civil War: First Battle of Manassas; Peninsula Campaign; Seven Days' Battles; Second Battle of Bull Run; Battle of Antietam; Battle of Fredericksburg; Siege of Suffolk; Battle of Gettysburg; Battle of Cold Harbor; Siege of Petersburg; Battle of Sayler's Creek; Appomattox Campaign

Commanders
- Notable commanders: Colonel William "Extra Billy" Smith

The 49th Virginia Infantry Regiment was an infantry regiment raised in Virginia for service in the Confederate States Army during the American Civil War. It fought mostly with the Army of Northern Virginia.

The 49th Virginia completed its organization in July 1861. Its members were from the counties of Prince William, Warren, Fauquier, Rappahannock, Amherst, and Shenandoah. Three companies fought at First Manassas and these companies formed the nucleus of the regiment. It was assigned to General Featherston's, Early's, W.Smith's, Pegram's, and J.A. Walker's Brigade, Army of Northern Virginia. The unit participated in many battles from Williamsburg to Cold Harbor, was active in Early's Shenandoah Valley operations, and took part in the final campaign at Appomattox.

It reported 40 casualties at First Manassas and in April, 1862, contained 539 effectives. The regiment lost fifty-three percent of the 424 at Seven Pines, had 2 killed and 36 wounded during the Seven Days' Battles, and suffered 5 killed and 73 wounded in the Maryland Campaign. At Fredericksburg 6 were killed and 46 wounded, at Gettysburg thirty-five percent of the 281 were disabled, and at The Wilderness and Spotsylvania 87 were lost. On April 9, 1865, it surrendered with 9 officers and 46 men.

The field officers were Colonels William "Extra Billy" Smith and Jonathan (John) Catlett Gibson, Lieutenant Colonels Edward Murray and Charles B. Christian, and Major Caleb Smith.

== See also ==
- List of Virginia Civil War units
