= 6th Virginia Cavalry Regiment =

Confederate States Army unit

- Flag of Virginia, 1861
- Active: November 1861 – April 1865
- Disbanded: April 1865
- Country: Confederate States of America
- Allegiance: Virginia
- Branch: Confederate States Army
- Role: Cavalry
- Engagements: Jackson's Valley Campaign; Seven Days' Battles; Second Battle of Bull Run; Battle of Antietam; Battle of Fredericksburg; Battle of Chancellorsville; Battle of Brandy Station; Battle of Gettysburg; Bristoe Campaign; Overland Campaign; Siege of Petersburg; Valley Campaigns of 1864; Appomattox Campaign; Battle of Five Forks

Commanders
- Notable commanders: Colonel Charles W. Field; Colonel Thomas S. Flournoy; Colonel John S. Green; Colonel Julien Harrison

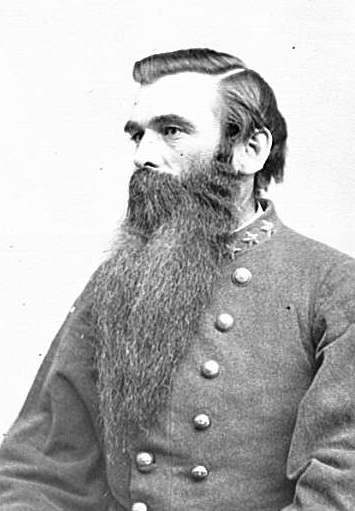
Col. John "Shac" Shackleford Green

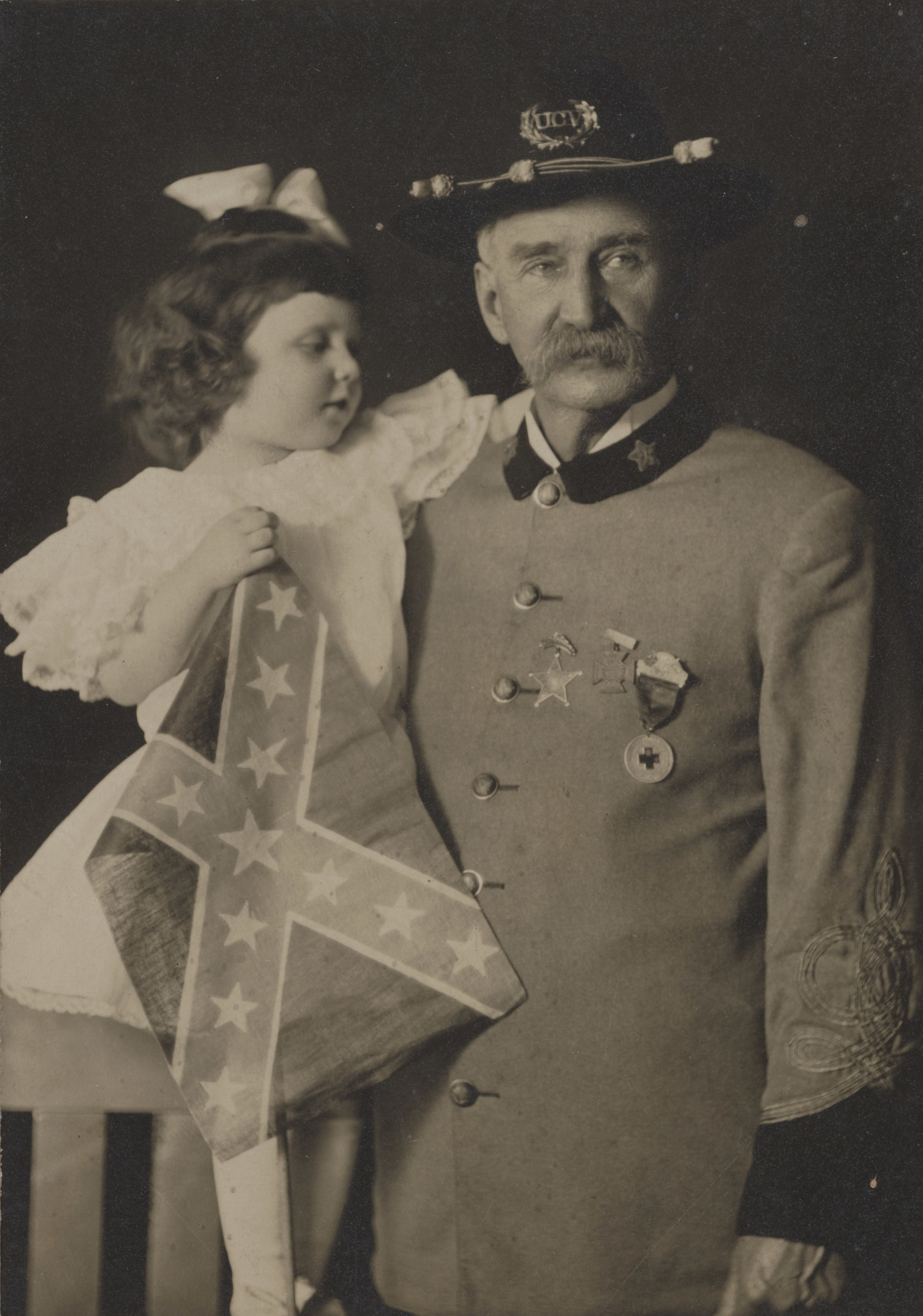
Civil War veteran Thomas Benjamin Amiss in U.C.V. uniform; enlisted in the 6th Virginia Cavalry as 3rd Cpl., Co. B

The 6th Virginia Cavalry Regiment was a cavalry regiment raised in Virginia for service in the Confederate States Army during the American Civil War. It fought mostly with the Army of Northern Virginia.

On September 11, 1861, Kentucky-born West Point graduate Col. Charles William Field, who had commanded the Cavalry Camp of Instruction in Ashland, Virginia with the assistance of Capt. Lunsford L. Lomax beginning in late June 1861, was appointed Colonel of the new 6th Regiment of Virginia Volunteer Cavalry. Initially, his Lt.Col. was Williams C. Wickham, and J. Grattan Cabell of Richmond, named the unit's Major. Col. Field initially divided the unit into seven companies, but the Governor's Guard and Henrico Light Dragoons never arrived (instead becoming Company I of the 4th Virginia Cavalry and 10th Virginia Cavalry, respectively), so the Clarke Cavalry and Rockingham Cavalry were substituted. Wickham also was reassigned before arrival, so Julian Harrison (a major planter and slaveholder from Columbia, Goochland County, Virginia) became the unit's initial Lt. Col. Some of the named companies had already seen action; others were newly formed.

Col. Field completed organizing Virginia's 6th Cavalry by November, 1861, at Manassas, Virginia. The Georgia Hussars arrived despite Georgia Governor Joseph E. Brown's objection to their having accepted state funds to arm, but following a skirmish near Burke's Station in Fairfax County, Virginia were assigned to the Jefferson Davis Legion of Mississippi Cavalry in December. As shown below, men of this unit were raised in Loudoun, Rappahannock, Clarke, Rockingham, Fairfax, Halifax, Pittsylvania, Jefferson, Frederick, Wise and Orange counties.

Sortable table
Company	Nickname	Recruited at	First Commanding Officer
A	Loudoun Cavalry (a/k/a/ Dulany Troop)	Loudoun County	Richard S. Dulany; 2nd Lt. George E. Plaster
B	Rappahannock Cavalry	Rappahannock County	Col. Richard S. Ewell; Sgt. Daniel Grimsley
C	Rockingham Cavalry (a/k/a River Rangers)	Rockingham County	Edward S. Yancey
D	Clarke Cavalry	Clarke County; Jefferson County; Frederick County	Capt. Hugh M. Nelson; Capt. E.P.C. Lewis
E	Georgia Hussars; Pittsylvania Dragoons	Savannah, Georgia; Pittsylvania County	Capt. Cabell Flournoy
F	Fairfax Cavalry (a/k/a Washington's Home Guard)	Fairfax	Capt. Edward B. Powell
G	Halifax Cavalry (a/k/a Flournoy Troop)	Halifax County	Thomas S. Flournoy
H	Wise Dragoons	Fauquier County	
I	Orange Rangers	Orange County	Gustavus J. Browning
K	Loudoun Cavalry	Loudoun County	Capt. Daniel T. Shreve; Capt. William W. Mead

When Col. Field was promoted to brigadier general of infantry, the unit was reorganized and the Pittsylvania Dragoons, led by Capt. Thomas Stanhope Flournoy's son, added. On April 15, 1862, Julian Harrison was named colonel of the 6th Virginia Cavalry, Dr. J. Grattan Cabell was promoted to lieutenant colonel, and Thomas S. Flournoy became the company's major. Flournoy, a prominent Virginia Whig had been a United States Congressman as well as an unsuccessful candidate for Virginia governor from the anti-Catholic and anti-immigrant Know Nothing Party in 1855. However, by month's end the reorganization changed pursuant to new legislation passed by the Confederate Congress which not only authorized conscription, but also promoted reorganization through election of officers, so 20 lieutenants and captains in the 6th Virginia cavalry failed to win their troop's confidence lost their commissions. The second reorganization that month promoted Flournoy to lieutenant colonel, and John ("Shac") Shackelford Green (despite being voted out as captain) became the unit's major. At this time, the 6th Cavalry and 2nd Virginia Cavalry were also assigned to Ewell's Division under Col. Thomas T. Munford's command to reinforce Gen. Stonewall Jackson in the Shenandoah Valley.

The unit later served in Robertson's, “Grumble” Jones', Lomax's, and Payne's Brigade, Army of Northern Virginia. It fought in Jackson's Valley Campaign and in the conflicts at Second Bull Run, Brandy Station, Upperville, Fairfield, Bristoe, Mine Run, The Wilderness, Todd's Tavern, Spotsylvania, Haw's Shop, and Cold Harbor. The regiment went on to take part in Early's Shenandoah Valley operations and the Appomattox Campaign.

Only 3 men surrendered on April 9, 1865, as most of the cavalry cut through the Federal lines and later disbanded. The field officers were Colonels Charles W. Field, Thomas Flournoy, John S. Green, and Julien Harrison; Lieutenant Colonels J. Grattan Cabell and Daniel T. Richards; and Majors Cabell E. Flournoy and Daniel A. Grimsley.

== Field officers ==
- Colonel Charles W. Field
- Colonel Thomas S. Flourney, Commanding Officer on the Sharpsburg Campaign
- Colonel John S. Green
- Colonel Julien Harrison
- Lieutenant Colonel J. Grattan Cabell
- Lieutenant Colonel Daniel T. Richards
- Major Cabell E. Flournoy
- Major Daniel A. Grimsley

== See also ==
- List of Virginia Civil War units
