= Jacob S. Eggborn =

American politician

Jacob Samuel Eggborn

Member of the Virginia House of Delegates from the Culpeper County, Virginia district
- In office December 7, 1881 – December 4, 1883
- Preceded by: Jonathan C. Gibson
- Succeeded by: Jonathan C. Gibson

Personal details
- Born: December 29, 1824 Culpeper County, Virginia
- Died: January 5, 1906 (aged 81) Culpeper, Virginia
- Citizenship: United States of America
- Spouse: Ida Burgess
- Parent(s): George and Amy McQueen Eggborn
- Occupation: farmer, sheriff

Jacob Samuel Eggborn (December 29, 1824 – January 5, 1906) was a farmer, sheriff and member of the Virginia House of Delegates, representing Culpeper County in the Virginia General Assembly for one two-year term that began in December 1881.

He was born in 1824 to George Eggborn (1796–1848) and his wife Amy Ann McQueen (1801–1835), who had moved to that area of Culpeper County two years earlier. His elder brother Perry J. Eggborn had held the same General Assembly seat for two terms before the American Civil War. They also had sisters Elizabeth Frances Eggborn (1821–1899), Amanda (b. 1825), Martha Ann Eggborn Perry (1819–1887) and Lucy (1829–1852).

Jacob Samuel Eggborn was the Culpeper County sheriff by 1860, and had real estate worth about $9000 and an equal amount of personal property. On December 11, 1884, the 59-year-old farmer married 27-year-old Ida Burgess in Culpeper, and they had a son George (1886 – after 1928) and another child Arney (1893–).

Due to Eggborn's strong support of Republican Rutherford B. Hayes (who won the presidential election of 1876, defeating Democrat Samuel Tilden), a post office was established called Eggbornsville, Virginia, on August 22, 1877, at the Eggborn Brothers store. To demonstrate bipartisan spirit, the first postmaster was William F. Kyle. Brothers Jacob A. ("Army") Eggborn and Edward J. Eggborn took over the postmastership in 1885 (during the Democratic administration of Grover Cleveland) and William H. Eggborn succeeded them in 1900. That post office closed in 1915, but the store continued operating until 1934.
