= Fairview Cemetery (Culpeper, Virginia) =

Historic cemetery in Virginia, United States

- U.S. National Register of Historic Places
- Virginia Landmarks Register
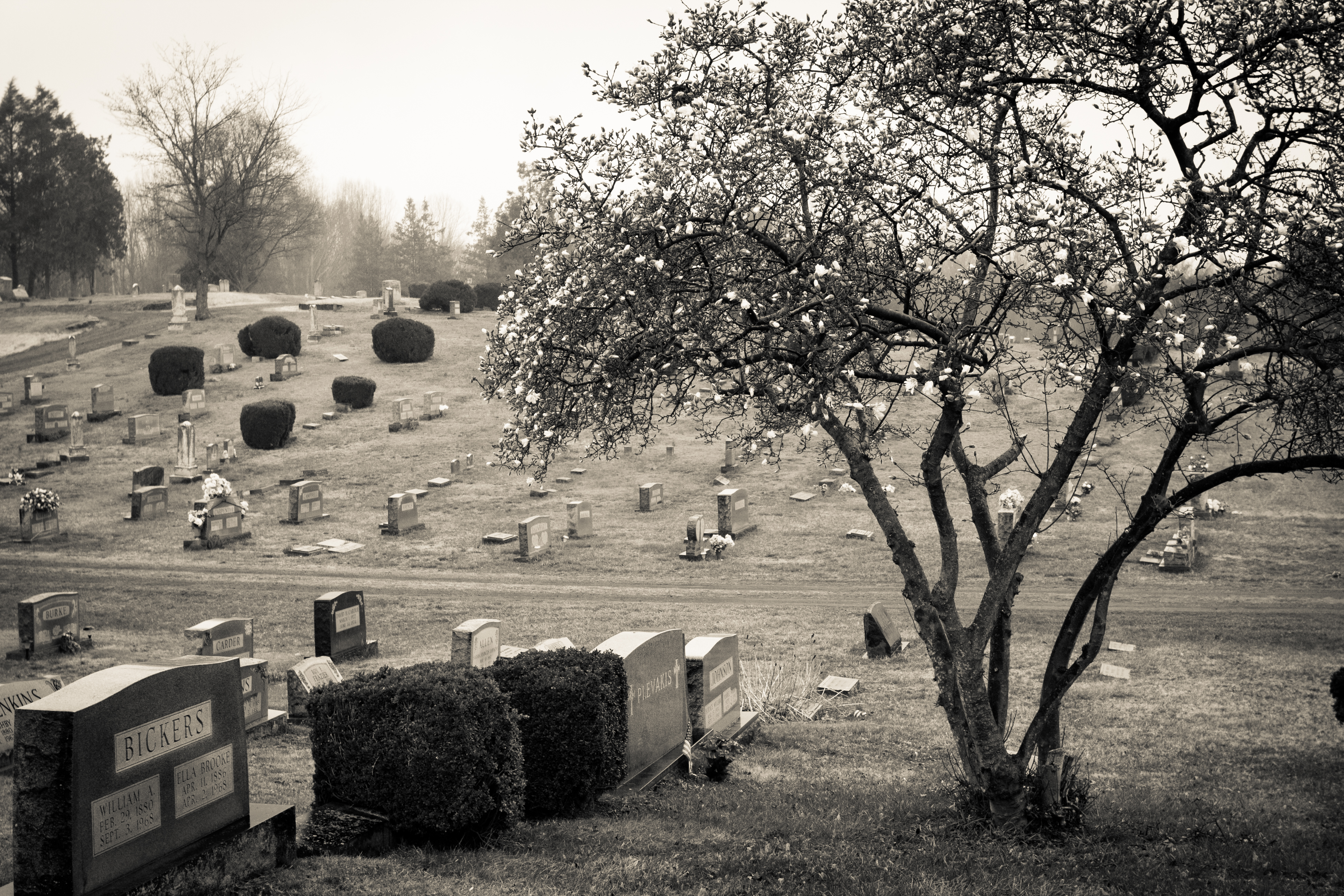
- Fairview Cemetery, March 2013

- Location within Virginia Location within the United States
- Location: VA 522, approx. 1/2 mi. W of Main St., Culpeper, Virginia, United States
- Coordinates: 38°28′52″N 78°00′19″W
- Area: 20 acres (8.1 ha)
- Built: 1855
- Built by: Culpeper Hardware Manufacturing (1907 caretaker’s lodge)
- Architectural style: Late 19th and Early 20th Century American Movements
- NRHP reference No.: 05001521
- VLR No.: 204-5031

Significant dates
- Added to NRHP: January 11, 2006
- Designated VLR: September 8, 2004

Fairview Cemetery, also known as Citizens' Cemetery and Antioch Cemetery, is a historic cemetery located at Culpeper, Culpeper County, Virginia, United States.

== History ==
It was established in 1855. The property includes a contributing mid-19th-century municipal cemetery, an early-20th-century African-American cemetery, a monument to Confederate dead (1881), an enclosure wall, and a caretaker's lodge.

It was listed on the National Register of Historic Places in 2006.

Notable people buried there include A.P. Hill (1825-1865), Confederate general, United States Congressmen John S. Barbour (1790–1855) and John Franklin Rixey (1854–1907).
