= Culpeper Minutemen =

- Active: July 12, 1775 - January 1776; 1860-1865; 1898; 1917-1918
- Disbanded: Merged into the Company B, 13th Virginia Infantry, Confederate States Army
- Country: Great Britain; Confederate States of America; United States; Virginia
- Allegiance: United States; Confederate States of America; Virginia
- Branch: (Infantry) Virginia Militia Confederate States Army Virginia National Guard U.S. Army Virginia Defense Force
- Type: Militia, army, National Guard, state defense force
- Size: (250) American Revolutionary War ? American Civil War ? Spanish–American War ? World War I ? Virginia Defense Force
- Nickname: The Old Bergaide
- Engagements: American Revolutionary War: Battle of Great Bridge (1775); American Civil War Spanish–American War World War I

Commanders
- American Revolutionary Commander: Colonel Lawrence Taliaferro
- American Revolutionary Executive Officer: Lieutenant Colonel Edward Stevens

The Culpeper Minutemen were a militia group formed in 1775 in the district around Culpeper, Virginia. Like minutemen in other British colonies, the men drilled in military tactics and trained to respond to emergencies "at a minute's notice".

== Organization ==
The Culpeper Minutemen were organized on July 17, 1775 in the district created by the Third Virginia Convention consisting of the counties of Orange, Fauquier and Culpeper. Recruitment began in September 1775 with four companies of 50 men from Fauquier and Culpeper counties each and two companies of 50 men from Orange County. The District Committee of Safety determined that the militia was to meet under a large oak tree in "Clayton's old field" on the Catalpa estate near today's Yowell Meadow Park in Culpeper, Virginia.

== Engagements ==
The Culpeper Minutemen fought for the colonial side in the first year of the American Revolution and are remembered for their company flag: a white banner depicting a rattlesnake, featuring the phrases "Liberty or Death" and "Don't Tread on Me". At the time, Culpeper was considered frontier territory. In October 1775, the Minutemen were sent to Hampton in response to British ships attempting to land. The riflemen were able to effectively shoot the men manning the ships cannons, and the fleet eventually sailed away.

The Culpeper militia next participated in the Battle of Great Bridge in December 1775. The battle was a complete American victory. There were accounts of the battle that suggested the British were unnerved by the reputation of the frontiersmen.

The Culpeper Minutemen disbanded in January 1776 under orders from the Committee of Safety. Many of the minutemen continued to serve. Some joined the continental line, and others fought under Daniel Morgan, such as William Lloyd, who lived from 1748 to 1834. After fighting in Morgan's group, he joined the 11th Virginia Regiment and encamped at Valley Forge; he was honorably discharged at Fort Sullivan in 1779. William died May 2, 1834, in Kentucky.

John Marshall, the fourth Chief Justice of the United States, was a member of the original Culpeper Minutemen.

== American Civil War ==
In 1860, the Culpeper Minutemen were formed under the same oak tree where the 1775 Minutemen had organized. They again carried a flag with a rattlesnake and the motto "Don't Tread on Me" on one side. While on the other side was the coat of arms of Virginia with the motto of the state "Sic semper tyrannis." The unit became part of Company B, 13th Virginia Infantry and served in the Confederate States Army for the duration of the American Civil War.

== Later Minutemen ==
According to the Museum of Culpeper History, the Minutemen were again organized for the Spanish–American War, but were never activated for duty. The Culpeper Minutemen were again organized for World War I, and joined the 116th Infantry.
