= Daniel A. Grimsley =

American politician

Member of the Virginia Senate from the Orange, Culpeper and Madison Counties district
- In office October 5, 1869 – December 8, 1879
- Preceded by: Philip W. Strother
- Succeeded by: John R. Strother

Member of the Virginia House of Delegates from the Culpeper County, Virginia district
- In office December 2, 1885 – March 6, 1887
- Preceded by: J. C. Gibson
- Succeeded by: James Barbour

Personal details
- Born: April 3, 1840 Rappahannock County, Virginia, US
- Died: February 5, 1910 (aged 69) Culpeper County, Virginia, US
- Spouse: Elizabeth A. Browning (1845–1919)
- Occupation: lawyer, Confederate officer, politician, judge

Military service
- Allegiance: Confederate States of America
- Branch/service: cavalry
- Years of service: 1862-1865
- Rank: Major
- Unit: 6th Virginia Cavalry
- Battles/wars: Battle of Front Royal,

Daniel Amon Grimsley (April 3, 1840 – February 5, 1910) was a Virginia lawyer, Confederate officer, ten-year member of the Virginia senate and for 23 years judge in Culpeper County.

== Early and family life ==
The son of Baptist minister Barnett Grimsley (1807-18895) and his wife the former Ruth Updike (who had married in 1830). Grimsley had an older brother Thomas F. Grimsley (1835–1913, who had also become a teacher and Baptist minister by 1860) and older sisters Elizabeth (b. 1831) and Martha (b.1838), as well as a younger sister Louisa (b. 1842). His father owned eight slaves in the 1860 census.

Daniel Grimsley married Elizabeth (Bettie) A. Browning, and they had children: Margaret (Maggie) Grimsley Drewry (1868–1941), Virginia (Birdie) L Grimsley Burckmyer (1869–1950), T. Edwin Grimsley (1871–1930), Mary Browning Grimsley Barbour (1873–1962), Frances (Fannie) Grimsley Smith (1875–1952), Elizabeth Barnett Grimsley Theus (1880–1951), and Ethel Grimsley (1882–1894).

== Career ==
As the American Civil War began and Virginia seceded from the Union, Grimsley's elder brother Thomas enlisted almost immediately in the 6th Virginia Cavalry, on May 8, 1861. Daniel Grimsley (who was characterized as a schoolteacher on the 1860 census but as a farmer on the enlistment roll) joined the same unit as a corporal at Manassas, Virginia, on April 22, 1862. He was a member of Payne's Brigade, Fitz Lee's Division. Following the Battle of Front Royal, although Thomas would remain a private for the rest of the war, Daniel was promoted to sergeant on June 20, 1862. He was wounded at least twice, and also frequently assigned to court martial duty. Daniel Grimsley was promoted to Captain on April 20, 1862, and to Major on June 4, 1864.

After the war, Grimsley read law under commonwealth attorney Horatio G. Moffet (1808–1892) of Rappahannock County, Virginia. Following admission to the Virginia bar, Grimsley moved to Culpeper and practiced law with James Barbour.

After adoption of the Virginia Constitution of 1869 and the Commonwealth's readmission to the Union, Culpeper County's voters elected Grimsley to represent them in the Virginia Senate. He served from 1869 and was re-elected twice times, serving for a decade. He ran again in 1885, this time to represent Culpeper County in the House of Delegates.

Not long afterward, fellow legislators elected him a judge of the Circuit Court in Culpeper, so his longtime law partner (and later in-law) James Barbour resumed the seat he had held before the American Civil War. Grimsley served as a judge in Culpeper for 23 years.

== Death and legacy ==
Judge Grimsley experienced a stroke on February 2, 1910, and died three days later at his home. He had a son, Capt. T. Edward Grimsley (who had become a lawyer by 1900), and five daughters.
