= Control lock =

Type of canal lock

A control lock, guard lock or stop lock differs from a normal canal lock in that its primary purpose is controlling variances in water level rather than raising or lowering vessels. A control lock may also be known as a tide lock where it is used to control seawater entering into a body of fresh water.

== Examples ==
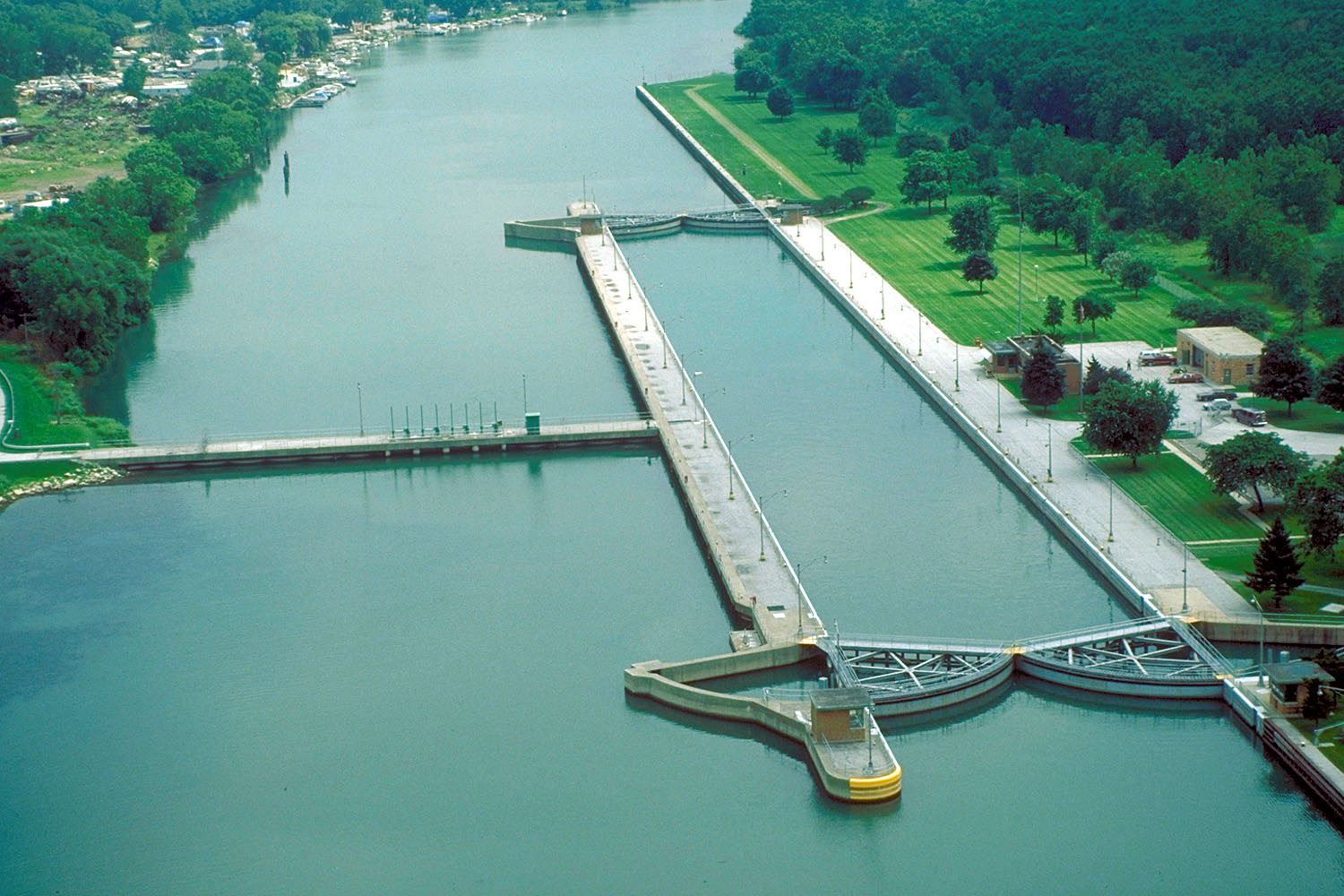
T.J. O’Brien Lock and Dam: A control lock between Lake Michigan and the Illinois Waterway. Note that there is little or no elevation change (aka: head) between the upper and lower ends of the lock.

The T. J. O’Brien Lock and Dam at Chicago, Illinois, is a guard lock that controls the outflow of water from Lake Michigan into the Illinois Waterway while locking vessels through between the waterway and Lake Michigan.

Lock 8 near the south end of the Welland Canal at Port Colborne, Ontario, Canada is a guard lock. Due to the large expanse of shallow water in Lake Erie, changes in wind direction and force create water level changes as great as 11 feet (3.4 m) at Port Colborne. Lock 8 controls the water level in the canal, keeping it independent of the fluctuations of Lake Erie, but allows ships to enter Lake Erie regardless of its level.

== See also ==
- Hydraulic engineering
  - Canal safety gates
  - Sluice
  - Watermill
  - Water slope
- Water resources
  - List of waterways
  - List of canals by country
