= Catalpa (Culpeper, Virginia) =

Plantation in Culpeper County, Virginia, US

Coordinates: 38°30′38.4″N 77°59′15.9″W

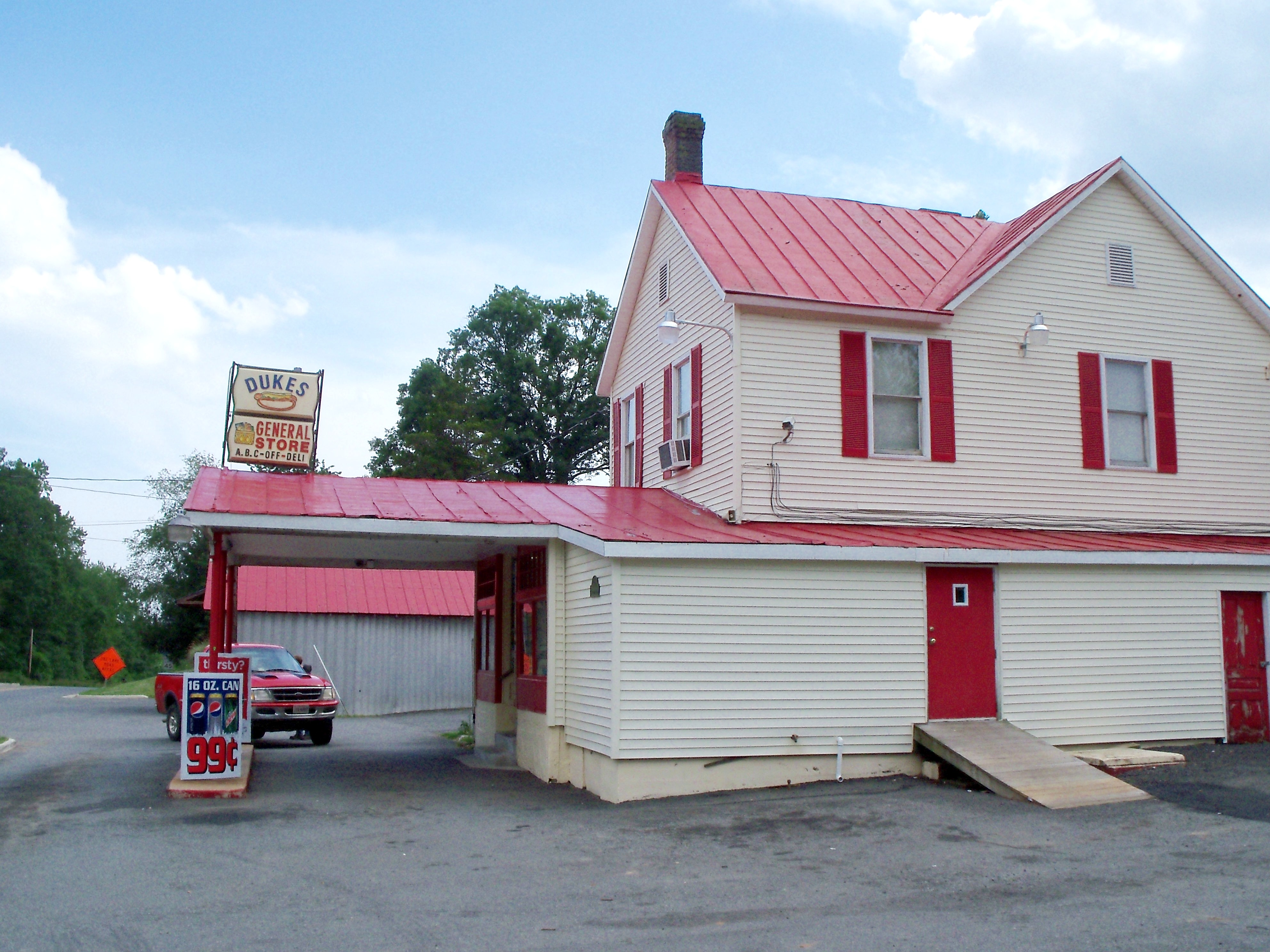
General store in the community of Catalpa

Catalpa was an 18th-century plantation near Culpeper in Culpeper County, Virginia. Catalpa is best known as the birthplace of John Strode Barbour, Jr. (29 December 1820 – 14 May 1892), a United States House Representative and United States Senator from Virginia. Catalpa is also known as the scene of the first encampment of the Culpeper Minutemen.

== History ==
During Virginia's colonial period, the Catalpa estate was the seat of Major Philip Clayton. The plantation was named after a catalpa tree that Clayton brought from Essex and transplanted on the property. Clayton's tree was the first catalpa introduced to Culpeper County. Philip Clayton married Ann Coleman the sister of Robert Coleman, on whose land the town of Culpeper was established in 1759, originally named "Fairfax" until the American Civil War. Philip Clayton was among the town's first trustees, along with Nathaniel Pendleton, William Green, William Williams, and Thomas Slaughter.

The Culpeper Minutemen organized on 17 July 1775 under a large oak tree at "Clayton's old field" on the Catalpa estate.
