= Eggbornsville, Virginia =

Unincorporated community in Virginia, United States

Coordinates: 38°34′50″N 78°03′32″W

Eggbornsville is an unincorporated community in Culpeper County, Virginia, United States.

== History ==
A post office called Eggbornsville was established in 1877, and remained in operation until it was discontinued in 1915. The community was named for the Eggborn family, the original owners of the town site.
