= John Strode Barbour (1866–1952) =

American lawyer

- Born: August 10, 1866; Beauregard, Virginia, US
- Died: May 6, 1952 (aged 85); Washington, D.C., US
- Education: University of Virginia
- Occupations: Newspaper editor, lawyer, mayor, politician
- Known for: member of Virginia Constitutional Convention of 1902
- Political party: Democratic Party
- Spouse: Mary B. Grimsley
- Parent(s): James Barbour; Fanny Thomas Beckham
- Relatives: nephew of John S. Barbour, Jr. second cousin of James Barbour and Philip P. Barbour

John Strode Barbour (August 10, 1866 – May 6, 1952) was a Virginia lawyer, businessman, and politician.

== Early life and education ==
Barbour was born on August 10, 1866, at Beauregard in Brandy Station, Culpeper County, Virginia. The Barbour political family, was one of the First Families of Virginia. His lawyer father James Barbour, had continued the family's political involvement, as well as served as a major in the Confederate States Army during the American Civil War. His mother was Fanny Thomas Beckham, and also bore daughter, Mrs. C.B. Wallace of Nashville, Tennessee.

Barbour's private education included William Hartman Kable's Charles Town Male Academy in Charles Town, West Virginia. In 1884, Barbour began reading law at John Franklin Rixey's law office in Culpeper, Virginia. Two years later, Barbour started a weekly newspaper, the Piedmont Advance, which operated for approximately two years. In 1887 Barbour began attending law school at the University of Virginia and graduated in 1888.

Barbour married Mary B. Grimsley, daughter of Culpeper judge Daniel A. Grimsley on April 4, 1894. They had no children.

== Career ==
After admission to the Virginia bar, the 21-year-old, Barbour returned to Culpeper and joined Rixey's law practice as Rixey was elected to the United States House of Representatives for Virginia's 8th congressional district.

From 1897 through 1898, Barbour served as mayor of Culpeper. Barbour was elected on May 23, 1901, to represent Culpeper County at the Constitutional Convention in Richmond, Virginia. At the convention on May 29, 1902, Barbour voted to proclaim the new constitution in effect without submitting it to the voters for ratification.

Barbour relocated to Fairfax County, Virginia in 1907 where he began a law firm with R. Walton Moore (former Assistant Secretary of State) and Thomas R. Keith, which had become Barbour, Garnett, Pickett & Keith by the time of his death. The firm's clients included the Potomac Electric Power Company and the Washington Railway & Electric Co. Barbour also tended a dairy herd at his Fairfax County estate and founded the Maryland and Virginia Milk Producers Association. From 1932 through 1949, Barbour was a member of the board of the Virginia State Library.

While residing in Fairfax, Virginia, Barbour built a home which he called "the Oaks" but which is now called the "Barbour House".

== Death ==
One of the last surviving members of the 1902 Virginia Constitutional Convention, Barbour died after a long illness at Doctors Hospital in Washington, D.C., on May 6, 1952.
