= John S. Barbour Jr. =

American politician

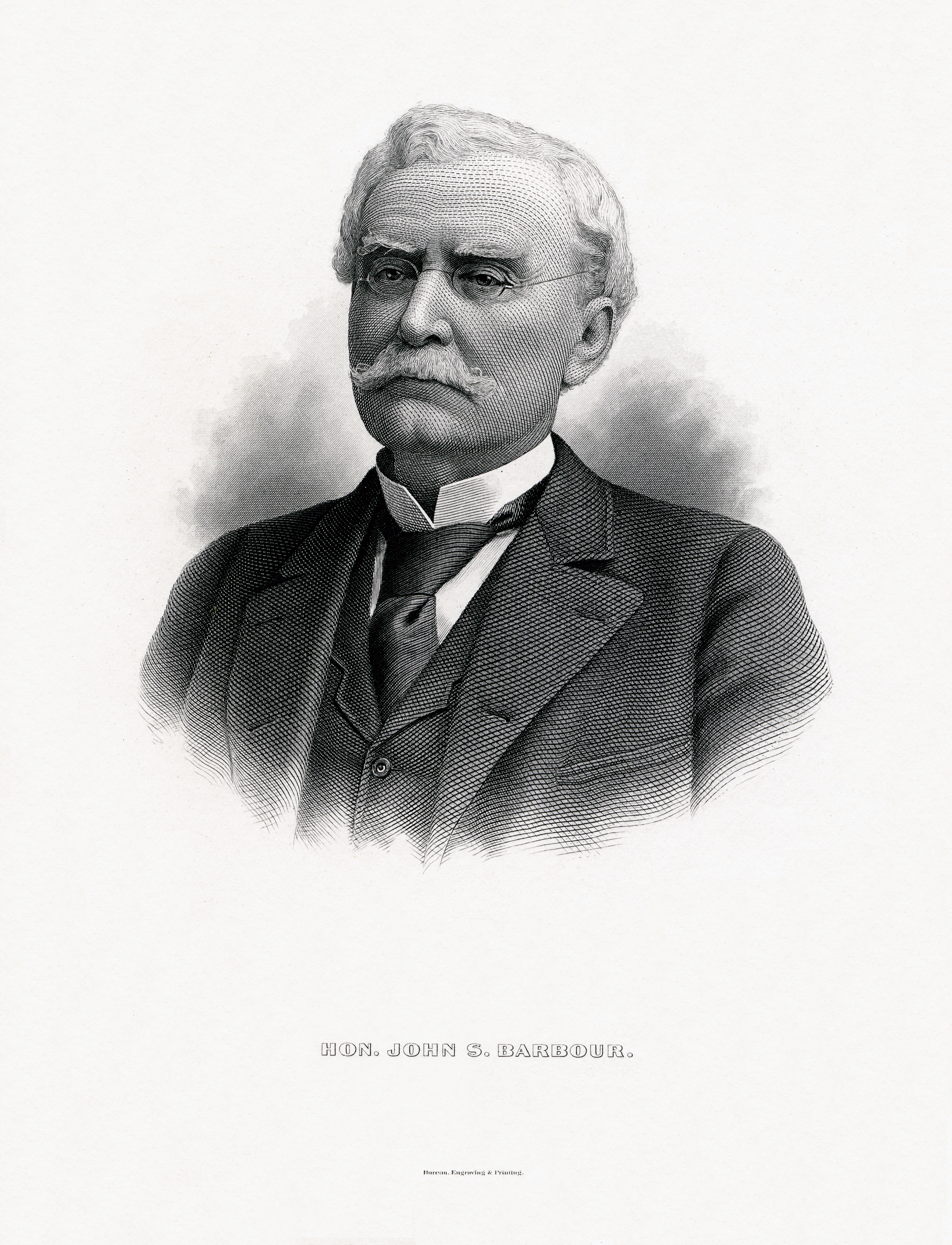

United States Senator from Virginia
- In office March 4, 1889 – May 14, 1892
- Preceded by: Harrison H. Riddleberger
- Succeeded by: Eppa Hunton

Member of the U.S. House of Representatives from Virginia's 8th district
- In office March 4, 1881 – March 3, 1887
- Preceded by: Eppa Hunton
- Succeeded by: William H. F. Lee

Member of the Virginia House of Delegates from Culpeper County
- In office December 6, 1847 – January 12, 1852
- Preceded by: Daniel F. Slaughter
- Succeeded by: James Barbour

Personal details
- Born: December 29, 1820 Culpeper, Virginia, U.S.
- Died: May 14, 1892 (aged 71) Washington, D.C., U.S.
- Party: Democratic
- Spouse: Susan Dangerfield (died 1886)
- Parent: John S. Barbour (father)
- Relatives: James Barbour (brother); John S. Barbour (nephew)
- Education: University of Virginia (LLB)

John Strode Barbour Jr. (December 29, 1820 – May 14, 1892) was an American politician and slave owner who served as U.S. representative and a senator from Virginia, and fought against the United States in the Confederate Army. He took power in Virginia from the short-lived Readjuster Party in the late 1880s, forming the first political machine of "Conservative Democrats", whose power was to last 80 years until the demise of the Byrd Organization in the late 1960s.

== Early life ==
Barbour was born on December 29, 1820, at Catalpa, near Culpeper, Virginia, the son of Virginia delegate and future U.S. Representative John S. Barbour. He had two sisters and a younger brother. Barbour attended the common schools and graduated from the law department of the University of Virginia at Charlottesville. He married Susan Dangerfield, daughter of a prominent family in Prince George's County, Maryland. His wife died in 1886.

== Career ==
Following his father's career path, Barbour was admitted to the Virginia bar in 1841 and began his legal practice in Culpeper. Five years later he ran for and won election as a member of the Virginia House of Delegates, serving (part-time, along with his private legal practice) from 1847 to 1851. Barbour became president of the Orange and Alexandria Railroad Co., serving from 1852 to 1881.

During the American Civil War, Barbour was a Confederate officer, as was his younger brother James. The family's Fleetwood Hill hosted General J. E. B. Stuart after the Confederate victory at the Battle of Chancellorsville, but the June 1863 engagement with Union forces, the Battle of Brandy Station (perhaps the largest cavalry battle of the war) was considered a draw.

After the war, both John and James resumed their legal careers, but while John concentrated in railroad matters, James bought the Richmond Enquirer and became its editor. After the restoration of civil rights to Confederate officers, John Barbour was elected as a Democrat to the 47th and two succeeding Congresses (March 4, 1881 - March 3, 1887). He succeeded Eppa Hunton II, a fellow Shenandoah Valley lawyer who declined to seek renomination. Barbour served as chairman of the Committee on the District of Columbia (48th and 49th Congresses). He declined to be a candidate for renomination in 1886, months after the death of his wife (and the year after his brother James was elected to Virginia's House of Delegates).

In the late 1880s, Barbour joined with other Conservative Democrats and opposed the Readjuster Party, a coalition of blacks and Republicans led by Harrison H. Riddleberger and William Mahone. He helped form the first political machine of "Conservative Democrats", whose power lasted 80 years until the demise of the Byrd Organization in the late 1960s.

In 1888, Barbour ran to succeed Senator Riddleberger when he declined to seek re-election (and died the following year). Elected as a Democrat to the United States Senate Barbour served from March 4, 1889, until his death. Hunton was appointed to serve until the election for the remainder of the term, which he won but declined to seek a full term.

== Death and legacy ==
Barbour died at his home in Washington, D.C., on May 14, 1892. He was interred in the burial ground at "Poplar Hill", Prince George's County, Maryland beside his wife Susan. His brother James' son, John S. Barbour, briefly became a newspaper editor, and later lawyer and mayor of Culpeper, although he moved to Fairfax County, Virginia.

== See also ==
- List of members of the United States Congress who died in office (1790–1899)

== Sources ==
- Memorial Services for John S. Barbour Jr. 52nd Cong., 2nd sess., 1892–1893. Washington, D.C.: Government Printing Office, 1893
- Quinn, James Thomas. "Senator John S. Barbour, Jr. and the Restoration of Virginia Democracy, 1883-1892." Master's thesis, University of Virginia, 1966.

U.S. House of Representatives
Preceded by Eppa Hunton, Jr.	Member of the U.S. House of Representatives from Virginia's 8th congressional district March 4, 1881 – March 4, 1887	Succeeded by William H. F. Lee
U.S. Senate
Preceded by Harrison H. Riddleberger	U.S. senator (Class 2) from Virginia; March 4, 1889 – May 14, 1892; Served alongside: John W. Daniel	Succeeded by Eppa Hunton, Jr.
