= John S. Barbour =

American politician (1790–1855)

John Strode Barbour

Member of the Virginia House of Delegates from the Culpeper district
- In office May 17, 1813 – December 1, 1833 Serving with Zephaniah Turner, John Turner
- Preceded by: William Champe Carter
- Succeeded by: John A. Thornton

Member of the Virginia House of Delegates from the Culpeper district
- In office December 4, 1820 – November 20, 1823 Serving with George Ficklin, Daniel Ward
- Preceded by: Ambrose P. Hill
- Succeeded by: Ambrose P. Hill

Member of the Virginia House of Delegates from the Culpeper district
- In office December 3, 1833 – November 30, 1834
- Preceded by: John S. Pendleton
- Succeeded by: Edmund Broadus

Member of the U.S. House of Representatives from Virginia's 15th district
- In office March 4, 1823 – March 3, 1833
- Preceded by: George Tucker
- Succeeded by: Edward Lucas

Personal details
- Born: August 8, 1790 Brandy Station, Virginia, US
- Died: January 12, 1855 (aged 64) Culpeper, Virginia, US
- Party: Jacksonian Democrat
- Spouse: Elizabeth Byrne
- Profession: politician, lawyer, farmer

John Strode Barbour Sr. (August 8, 1790 – January 12, 1855) was a nineteenth-century politician and lawyer from Virginia. He was the father of John Strode Barbour Jr. and the first cousin of James Barbour and Philip P. Barbour.

== Early and family life ==
Born at "Fleetwood" near Brandy Station, Virginia, Barbour attended private schools as a child, then the College of William and Mary, from which he graduated in 1808.

He married Elizabeth Byrne and had two sons (J.S. Barbour Jr. and Edwin Barbour) and two daughters (Sallie and Elizabeth Bryne Barbour Thompson). He was a slave owner.

== Career ==
After reading law and being admitted to the bar in 1811, Barbour commenced practice in Culpeper, Virginia. He served in the War of 1812 as an aide-de-camp.

== Political career ==
Barbour was elected and re-elected to the Virginia House of Delegates, serving from 1813 to 1816 and again from 1820 to 1823. Barbour was elected a Crawford Republican and Jacksonian to the United States House of Representatives in 1822, serving from 1823 to 1833, when he was succeeded by fellow Whig John M. Patton of Fredericksburg, Virginia. The elder Barbour was a member of the Virginia Constitutional Convention in 1829 and 1830, and returned to the House of Delegates for the final time in 1833 and 1834.

He helped found Fairfax Academy in Culpeper in 1844. Three years later his son John S. Barbour Jr. was elected to represent Culpeper County in the Virginia House of Delegates, continuing his father's tradition.

Barbour Sr. was chairman of the Democratic National Convention in 1852 and afterward resumed practicing law

== Death and legacy ==
Barbour died at his estate called "Fleetwood" near Culpeper, Virginia, on January 12, 1855. He was interred on the estate in the family cemetery. In 2000, Virginia erected a historical marker noting the former family mansion, Catalpa, the birthplace of his son discussed below.

Barbour's family supported the Confederacy during the American Civil War. In 1863 Fleetwood Hill was part of the Battle of Brandy Station (land acquired by the Civil War Trust in 2013, and expected to be restored and interpreted). The Barbour family lost their slaves in the aftermath, but regained political prominence after Reconstruction ended. His son John S. Barbour Jr. (who had served in the Virginia House of Delegates beginning in 1847 and had become President of the Orange and Alexandria Railroad in 1852), helped organize the demise of the Readjuster Party and establish a Democratic political organization which retained power in Virginia for decades (J.S. Barbour Jr. serving in the U.S. House of Representatives 1881–1886, and in the U.S. Senate from 1889 to 1892). His namesake J. S. B. Thompson married his daughter Eliza Byrne Barbour in 1850, worked for various railroads (including the Southern Railway), and continued to exercise political influence (helping Thomas S. Martin win election as U.S. Senator in 1893 and accused of corruption in 1911). His grandson John Strode Barbour became a prominent lawyer, newspaper editor and Culpeper's mayor (although he later moved to Fairfax County, Virginia).

U.S. House of Representatives
Preceded by George Tucker	Member of the U.S. House of Representatives from Virginia's 15th congressional district March 4, 1823 – March 3, 1833 (obsolete district)	Succeeded by Edward Lucas
