= Quantico Creek =

Coordinates: 38°32′38″N 77°17′32″W

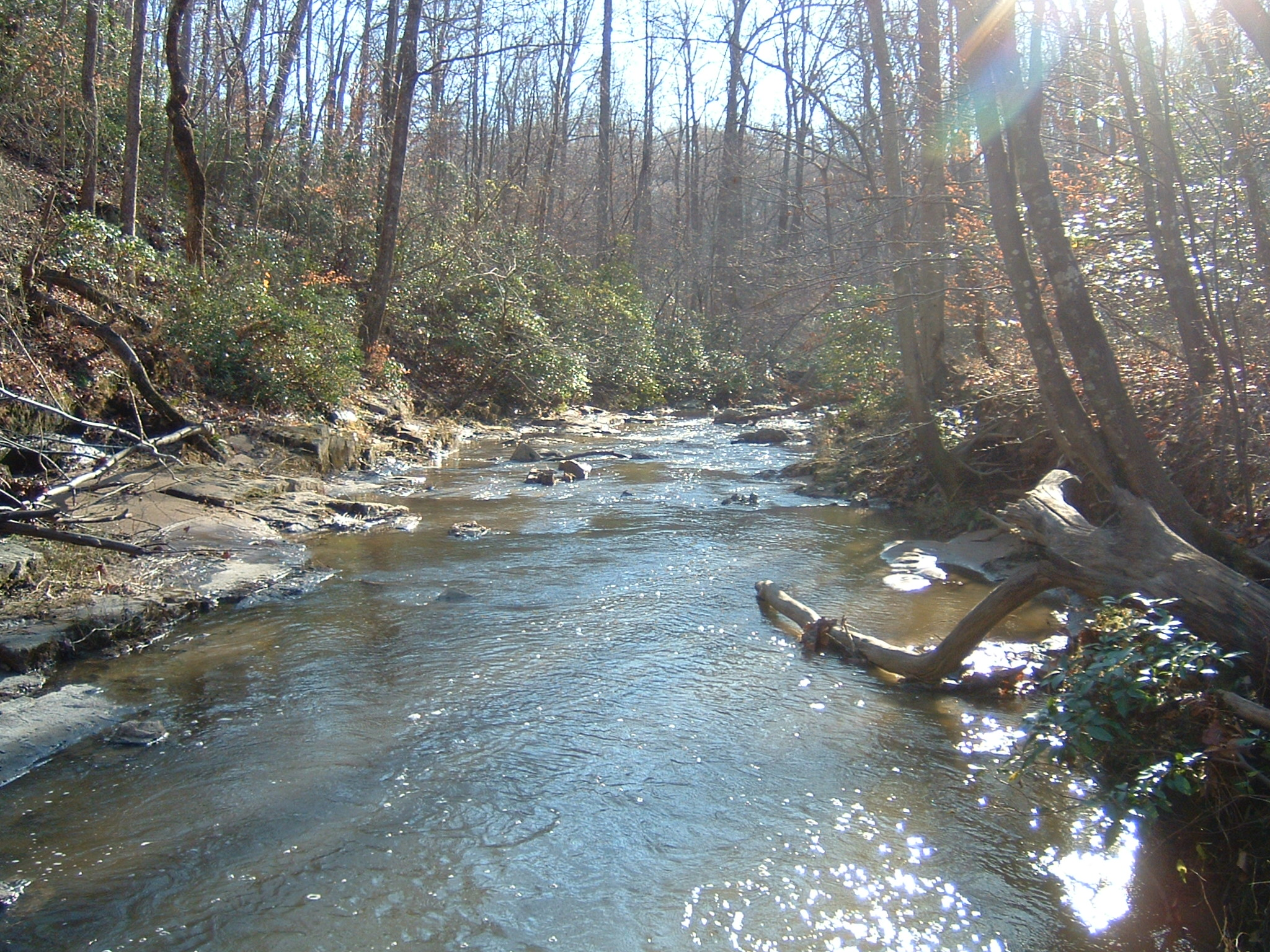
- Quantico Creek in Prince William Forest Park

Location
- Country: United States
- State: Virginia
- County: Prince William County

Physical characteristics
- Mouth
  - location: Potomac River
  - elevation: 0 feet (0 m)
- Length: 13.7 mi (22.0 km)

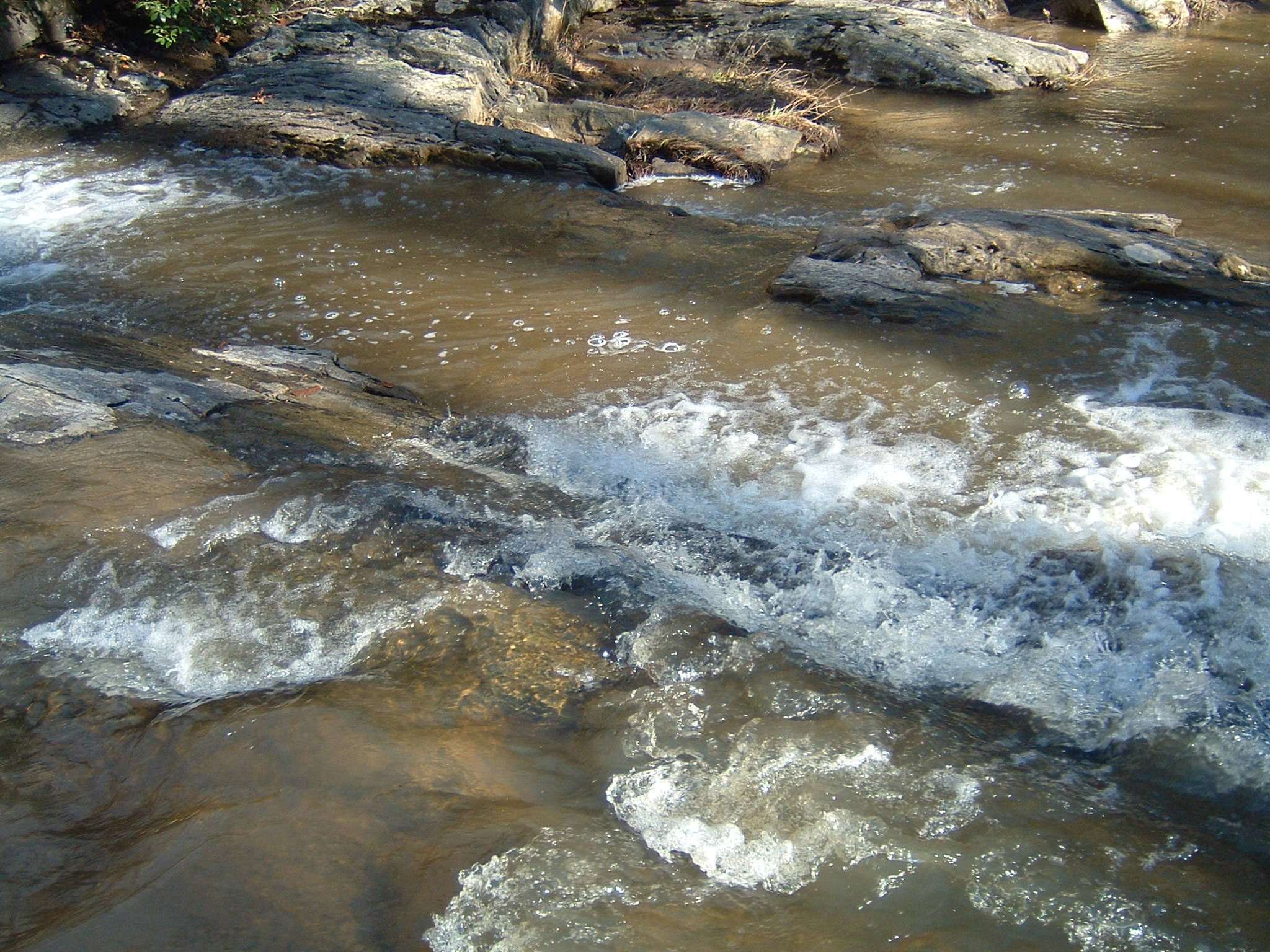
Quantico Falls in Prince William Forest Park

Quantico Creek is a 13.7-mile-long (22.0 km) partially tidal tributary of the Potomac River in eastern Prince William County, Virginia. Quantico Creek rises southeast of Independent Hill, flows through Prince William Forest Park and Dumfries and empties into the Potomac at Possum Point.

== History ==
John Smith in 1608 reported the existence of a Doeg community called Pamacocack on the banks of this creek, as well as on the directly opposite (Maryland) side of the Potomac. This is thought to be a likely candidate for the place Henry Spelman was found living among the natives, which he reported was named "Nacottawtanke, but by our english cald [sic] Camocacocke". Early land patents spell the name of the creek variously as Quancico (1654), Quanticotte (1654, 1658), Quantecot (1657), Quanticoke (1664), Quonticutt (1665), and Quanticutt (1665).

In 1690, settler Richard Gibson erected a gristmill on Quantico Creek near what is now the town of Dumfries. Scottish settlers then established a settlement and port on the estuary of Quantico Creek downstream after the bars to Virginia's profitable tobacco trade were lifted by the Navigation Law of 1707. West of that port, the land was quickly cleared of its timber and was planted with crops such as cotton and tobacco. These cash crops were harvested and shipped out through the port of Dumfries at the head of the Quantico harbor. A customhouse and warehouse followed in 1731, and many others cropped up along the estuary by 1732. The growth of tobacco caused the area around the creek to erode, and the creek was filled with silt.

The mid-19th century saw the development of some mining operations along the creek, consisting of the Greenwood Gold Mine, located at the headwaters of the North Branch near Independent Hill, and the Cabin Branch Pyrite Mine, located about 1 mile west of Dumfries and now within the Park.

Both mines were significant sources of pollution on the creek. The pyrite mine was a source of sulfuric acid, formed from the natural breakdown of pyrite, while mercury was used extensively in the gold extraction process. At one point, the water in the creek was nearly as acidic as vinegar. Both mines have since undergone significant reclamation to restore the creek and its surroundings to an acceptable state of health, especially within the park.

Today, the creek is not navigable because of silting in. Most of its watershed lies in Prince William Forest Park and the town of Dumfries. The mines are no longer in operation. A power plant on Possum Point uses the water from the creek to cool itself.

== Communities ==
Several communities, some extinct, lie near Quantico Creek. Communities are listed from the Quantico's source to its mouth on the Potomac.

- Independent Hill
- Hickory Ridge (extinct)
- Batestown (extinct)
- Triangle
- Dumfries
- Quantico, site of the Marine Corps Base Quantico

== See also ==
- List of rivers of Virginia
