= Virginia State Route 619 (Prince William County) =

Highway in Virginia

State Route 619

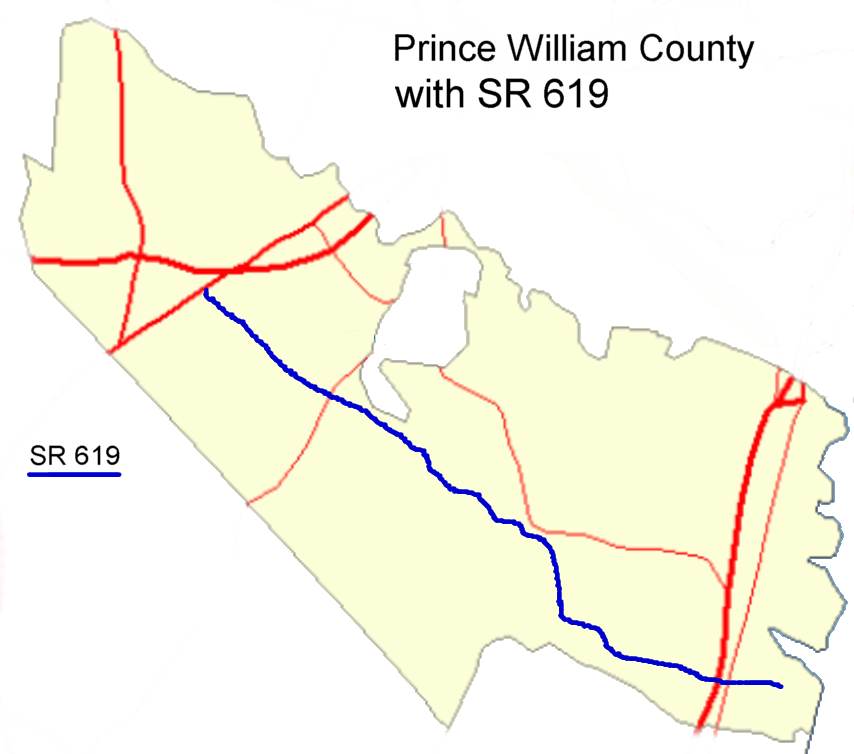

Route information
- Maintained by Virginia Department of Transportation (VDOT)
- Length: 27.85 mi (44.82 km) Linton Hall Road 5.94 mi Bristow Road 9.16 mi Joplin Road 10.18 mi Fuller Heights Road 1.79 mi

Major junctions
- West end: US 29 / SR 55 in Gainesville
- SR 28 in Bristow To SR 649 in Brentsville SR 234 Old in Independent Hill; I-95 in Triangle US 1 in Triangle
- East end: SR 761 near Marine Corps Base Quantico

Location
- Country: United States
- State: Virginia

Highway system
- Virginia Routes; Interstate; US; Primary; Secondary; Byways; History; HOT lanes

State Route 619 in Prince William County, Virginia is a secondary state highway. SR 619 provides a cross-county connector as well as a major artery for commuters. SR 619 is known by four names: Linton Hall Road, Bristow Road, Joplin Road, and Fuller Heights Road. There are also two short concurrencies: one with SR 234 Old in Independent Hill, and one with Fuller Military Road on the border of Marine Corps Base Quantico.

== Route description ==
=== Linton Hall Road ===
Linton Hall Road starts out at the intersection with US 29 (Lee Highway) and SR 55 (John Marshall Highway). This intersection is part of the Gainesville Interchange project. Gallerher Road has been renamed SR 55 (John Marshall Highway), and the former SR 55 between Gallerher and U.S. 29 is currently a dead end, and will become a cul-de-sac, without access to U.S. 29.

Linton Hall Road starts out as a six-lane divided highway passing the Virginia Gateway retail development to the north. As SR 674 (Wellington Road) is passed, there is empty land to the northeast (until SR 1040, Limestone Drive). This land will become part of the Virginia Gateway Center. At Glenkirk Road, Linton Hall Road reduces to a four-lane divided highway.

Linton Hall Road passes by many more subdivisions, including Victory Lakes and Braemar in Bristow on its way to SR 28 (Nokesville Road). Linton Hall Road has been widened from two lanes undivided to four lanes divided from SR 675 (Glenkirk Road) to SR 621 (Devlin Road) by VDOT. Prince William County was working on a project to widen Linton Hall Road from two lanes to four from Devlin Road to SR 28 (Nokesville Road). This project is now complete. Part of the project includes straightening out Linton Hall Road near Braemar. This has left behind two segments of the old alignment of SR 619, named Devlins Grove Place and Braemar Village Plaza.

=== Bristow Road ===
On the other side of SR 28, SR 619 becomes Bristow Road and reduces to two lanes undivided. It passes through the center of the original town of Bristow, crosses Southern Railway tracks (that are also used by the Virginia Railway Express commuter service). Bristow Road then passes to the southwest of Manassas Regional Airport and intersects with SR 611 (Valley View Drive), which leads one to the new Bristow post office and to the unincorporated town of Aden. Soon after it intersects in Brentsville with SR 692, Lucasville Road, which will take one back to the south Manassas area. Near this location is where Cedar Run and Broad Run merge to form the Occoquan River. Once past the Cedar Run bridge, SR 619 continues past homes on large lots, farmland, and forest on its way to Independent Hill. It is there where it meets Independent Hill Road, part of SR 234 Old.

When SR 234 (Dumfries Road) was widened to four lanes divided, and relocated slightly north, the old Dumfries Road was renamed Independent Hill Road, and the rest was made an extension of Bristow Road, ironically signed as SR-619. After SR 619 turns right, unposted, onto Joplin Road, Bristow Road continues (also as SR-619) and intersects with the current SR 234, Dumfries Road.

=== Joplin Road ===
Joplin Road starts out as a two-lane undivided road in Independent Hill at an intersection with Bristow Road. It starts out in a southerly direction, soon crossing SR 646 (Aden Road) on its way out of town. It soon starts its life as the border between Prince William Forest Park and Marine Corps Base Quantico.

The road curves to the southeast, following the border between the park and the base. To the north, the park gives way to what is left of the town of Joplin. After a park entrance, there is another group of homes, and another park entrance. After that Joplin Road widens to four lanes divided, and almost immediately has an interchange with Interstate 95. It stays four lanes divided until it comes to an intersection with US 1. This is the end of Joplin Road.

=== Fuller Heights Road ===
Many mapping agencies consider that SR 619 follows Fuller Military Road. However, the legislature of the State of Virginia in 1983 released a report that concluded that Fuller Road is part of Marine Corps Base Quantico, a part of the U.S. Government, and as such, the Virginia Department of Transportation has not given Fuller Road any state route designation. Instead, Fuller Heights Road, which services a part of the town of Triangle has been designated as part of SR 619. The gate on Fuller Military Road for Marine Corps Base Quantico is after the intersection with Fuller Heights Road, so residents using SR 619 are not affected.

There is even confusion by the Marines about SR 619. They released maps of Fuller Military Road in 2008 that showed that SR 619 was Fuller Road, and not Fuller Heights Road.

After the intersection with US 1, SR 619 continues on Fuller Road for one block, and then immediately turns onto Fuller Heights Road as a two-lane undivided roadway. This route continues until the intersection with SR 761 (Windsor Road), where SR 619 terminates. South is a gate into the Marine Corps base, and north is more housing in Triangle.

==== Future construction ====
The Prince William County Board of Supervisors has gotten jurisdiction and passed a resolution to widen the portion of Fuller Road between US 1 and Fuller Heights Road to four lanes divided, providing better access to both Triangle and Marine Corps Base Quantico.

== History ==
=== Linton Hall Road ===
==== Name ====
Linton Hall Road was named after Linton Hall Military School, (later renamed Linton Hall School.) The school was named after a Catholic nun, Sister Baptista Linton, in honor of the land she donated to the church for the education of poor children.

==== Construction ====
Linton Hall Road was two lanes up until 2005. The VDOT project widened it to four or six lanes from US 29 to Devlin Road, and the Prince William County project widened it to four lanes divided from there to SR 28.

=== Bristow Road ===
Bristow Road is named after the town at one of its ends, Bristow, Virginia. The road was always a two-lane undivided road to Independent Hill, and stopped at SR 234 (Dumfries Road). When SR 234 was widened and relocated north, most of Dumfries Road was renamed as an extension of Bristow Road. Now, Bristow Road extends all the way to the new alignment of SR 234, but not all of it is part of SR 619. See Virginia State Route 234 Old (Independent Hill) for more details.

=== Joplin Road ===
Joplin Road is named after the town of Joplin, for it was the main road traversing that town. When the Chopawamsic Recreational Demonstration Area was to be started, the residents of Joplin were made offers for their land. All that remains of the town of Joplin is a few houses on Joplin Road and nearby roads.

== Major intersections ==
The entire route is in Prince William County.

Location	mi	km	Destinations	Notes
Gainesville	0.00	0.00	US 29 (Lee Highway) / SR 55 west (John Marshall Highway) to I-66	
Gainesville			Wellington Road	
Bristow	4.10	6.60	SR 1566 (Sudley Manor Drive)	
Bristow	5.94	9.56	SR 28 (Nokesville Road)	
Brentsville	10.29	16.56	SR 692 (Lucasville Road) to SR 649	
Independent Hill	15.10	24.30	SR 3245 (Independent Hill Drive) to SR 234	former SR 234 north
Independent Hill	15.68	25.23	To SR 234 south / Bristow Road	former SR 234 south
Independent Hill	15.89	25.57	SR 646 (Aden Road)	
	25.52	41.07	I-95 – Washington, Fredericksburg	I-95 exit 150
Triangle	25.86	41.62	US 1 (Jefferson Davis Highway) – National Museum of the Marine Corps, Locust Shade Park	
Triangle	26.06	41.94	Fuller Road - Marine Corps Base Quantico, Quantico, Marine Corps University	
Triangle	27.85	44.82	SR 761 (Windsor Road)	
1.000 mi = 1.609 km; 1.000 km = 0.621 mi
