= Hickory Ridge, Virginia =

- Extinct unincorporated town
- Location within the state of Virginia Hickory Ridge, Virginia (Virginia) Hickory Ridge, Virginia (the United States)
- Coordinates: 38°34′46″N 77°21′51″W
- Country: United States
- State: Virginia
- County: Prince William
- Time zone: UTC−5 (Eastern (EST))
  - Summer (DST): UTC−4 (EDT)

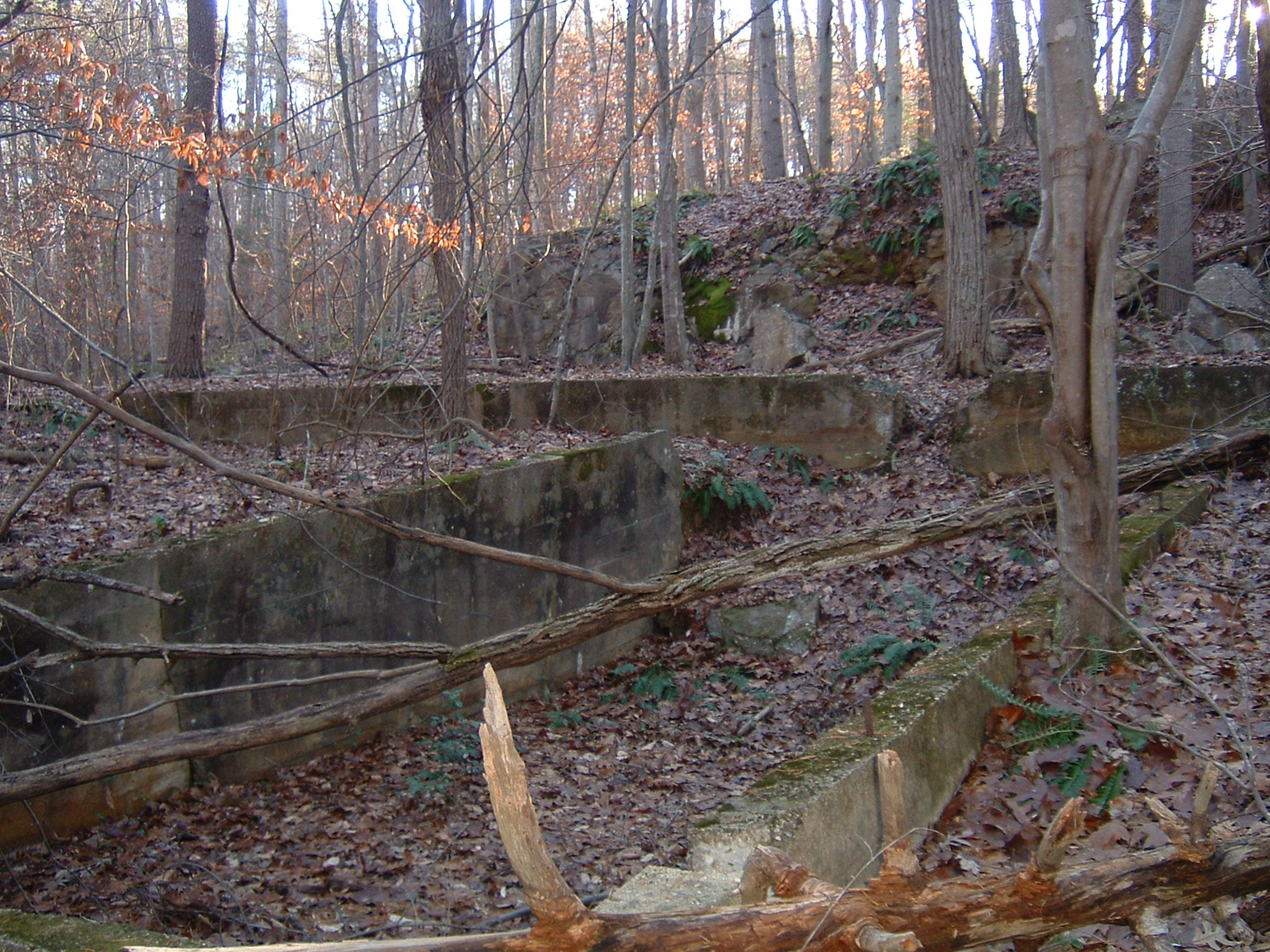
Remnants of the Cabin Branch Pyrite Mine in Prince William Forest Park

Hickory Ridge is an extinct unincorporated town in Prince William County, Virginia, United States. The town was located on land that is now part of Prince William Forest Park, a National Park Service property located adjacent to Marine Corps Base Quantico. The town was established shortly after the opening of the now defunct Cabin Branch Pyrite Mine in 1889 and was home to many of the mine employees.

== Overview ==
The center of town was located about one-half mile west of the mine itself, at the junction of what is now Scenic Drive and Pyrite Mine Road. It consisted largely of an Odd Fellows hall that also functioned as a church and school for black families, Porter's Inn, one of the few restaurants that would serve blacks, and the company store. At its peak, the town consisted of about 171 homes scattered over the area.

== Resettlement ==
Between 1933 and 1937 the Federal Government began implementing a Resettlement Administration program, where rural farmers were supposed to be relocated to more fertile areas. The RA bought 79 pieces of property in both Hickory Ridge and Batestown and condemned another 48, to form the Chopawamsic Recreational Demonstration Area.

The area residents resisted the relocation efforts, sometimes retreating into the park boundaries to escape detection. This continued until the beginning of World War II, where the park was taken over by the Office of Strategic Services as a spy training ground. The park was surrounded by barbed wire and fences, and patrolled by dogs and armed guards. All remaining forty-four holdouts were evicted, some literally carried away screaming.

At the end of the war, the displaced residents hoped their land would be restored, but to date these families have received no compensation. Instead, the property was turned over to the National Park Service and renamed Prince William Forest Park.

== See also ==
- Former counties, cities, and towns of Virginia
- List of ghost towns in Virginia
