= Goodwill Historic District, Chopawamsic RDA Camp 1 =

Historic district in Virginia, United States

- U.S. National Register of Historic Places
- U.S. Historic district
- Virginia Landmarks Register
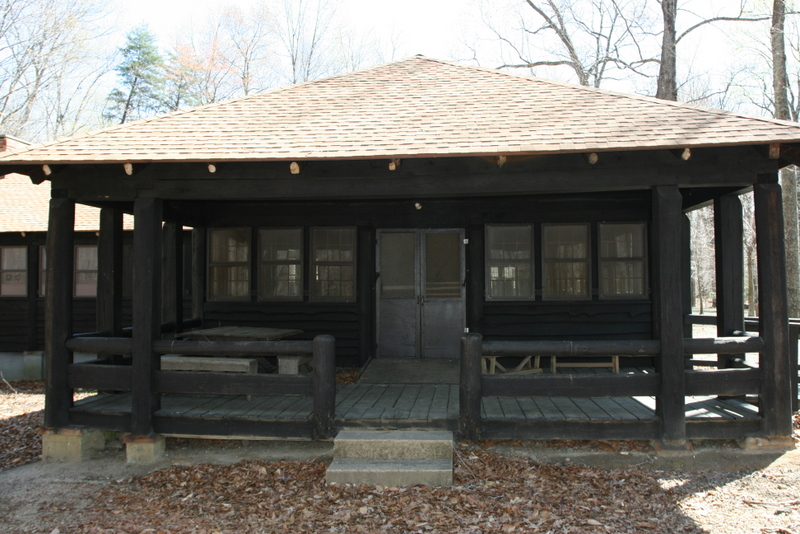

- Location within Northern Virginia Location within Virginia Location within the United States
- Nearest city: Triangle, Virginia
- Area: 13 acres (5.3 ha)
- Built: 1935
- Built by: CCC
- Architect: NPS
- Architectural style: NPS rustic architecture
- MPS: ECW Architecture at Prince William Forest Park 1933–1942 MPS
- NRHP reference No.: 89000456
- VLR No.: 076-0131

Significant dates
- Added to NRHP: June 12, 1989
- Designated VLR: September 20, 1988

The Goodwill Historic District, Chopawamsic RDA Camp 1 near Triangle, Virginia dates from 1934. It has also been known as Prince William Forest Park, as Camp Lichtman, and as Boys' Camp. It was listed as a historic district on the National Register of Historic Places on June 12, 1989. The listing included eight contributing buildings, one contributing structure and one contributing site on 13 acres (5.3 ha).

The historic district recognizes the 1934-1940 development of Chopawamsic Recreational Demonstration Area (RDA), specifically the role played by RDA Camp 1, the smallest of four Recreational Demonstration Areas within what became Prince William Forest Park. The camp's landscape and structures created after 1938 were designed by architects, engineers and draftsmen employed by the National Park Service.

== See also ==
- Catoctin Mountain Recreational Demonstration Area, Maryland
- St. Croix Recreational Demonstration Area, Minnesota
