= Chopawamsic Creek =

Coordinates: 38°30′25″N 77°19′10″W

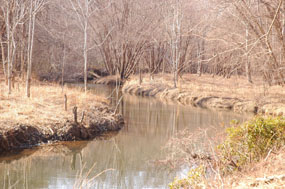

Location
- Country: United States
- Location: Prince William and Stafford counties, Virginia

Physical characteristics
- Mouth
  - location: Potomac River
  - elevation: 0 feet (0 m)
- Length: 6.8 mi (10.9 km)

Chopawamsic Creek is a 6.8-mile-long (10.9 km) tributary of the Potomac River in Prince William and Stafford counties, Virginia. Chopawamsic Creek is formed by the confluence of the North and South Branches of Chopawamsic Creek and empties into the Potomac River south of Quantico at the Marine Corps Base Quantico's Air Station. Breckenridge Reservoir lies at the stream's confluence with the North and South Branches. Along with its North Branch, Chopawamsic Creek forms part of the boundary between Prince William and Stafford counties. The North Branch flows through part of the Chopawamsic Backcountry Area in Prince William Forest Park.

== Variant names ==
The Board on Geographic Names decided upon Chopawamsic Creek as the stream's official name in 1891. Previously, it had been known by the following names according to the Geographic Names Information System:

- Chapanamsick Creek
- Chapawansick Creek
- Chapowamsic Creek
- Chipawanic Swamp
- Chipawansic Creek
- Chippowamsick Creek
- Chopawansick Creek
- Chopowamsic Creek

== Tributaries ==
Tributary streams are listed from source to mouth.

- North Branch Chopawamsic Creek
  - Middle Branch Chopawamsic Creek
- South Branch Chopawamsic Creek

== See also ==
- List of rivers of Virginia
