= Batestown, Virginia =

Coordinates: 38°34′50.4″N 77°18′43.3″W

Batestown is an extinct unincorporated community in Prince William County, Virginia, United States. The town was located along the farthest terminus of Batestown Road in what is now a western neighborhood of Dumfries along the banks of Quantico Creek. It was an enclave for freed slaves named for Mary Bates, the matriarch of the community.

Batestown and Hickory Ridge both suffered the same fate. Between 1933 and 1937, the Federal Government began implementing a Resettlement Administration program to form Chopawamsic Recreational Demonstration Area, where rural farmers were supposed to relocate for more fertile land. The RA bought 79 pieces of property in both Hickory Ridge and Batestown and condemned another 48, to form a new recreation area. However, the RA often made no effort to actually resettle the displaced residents.

The area residents resisted the relocation efforts, sometimes retreating into the park boundaries to escape detection. This continued until the beginning of World War II, where the park was taken over by the OSS as a spy training ground. The park was surrounded by barbed wire and fences and patrolled by dogs and armed guards. All remaining forty-four holdouts were evicted, some literally carried away screaming.

At the end of the war, the displaced residents hoped their land would be restored, but to date these families have received no compensation. Instead, the property was turned over to the National Park Service and renamed Prince William Forest Park.

== See also ==
- Former counties, cities, and towns of Virginia
