= Pleasant Historic District =

Pleasant Historic District may refer to:

- Pleasant Historic District (Mount Pleasant, Tennessee), listed on the National Register of Historic Places (NRHP) in Maury County
- Pleasant Historic District, Chopawamsic RDA Camp 4, Triangle, Virginia, also NRHP-listed
