= Joplin, Virginia =

- Unincorporated community
- Location within the state of Virginia Joplin, Virginia (Virginia) Joplin, Virginia (the United States)
- Coordinates: 38°33′39″N 77°23′6″W
- Country: United States of America
- State: Virginia
- County: Prince William
- Time zone: UTC-5 (Eastern (EST))
  - Summer (DST): UTC-4 (EDT)

Joplin is an unincorporated community and former town in Prince William County, Virginia, United States. The town was located on land taken to form Chopawamsic Recreational Demonstration Area and is now part of Prince William Forest Park, a National Park Service property located adjacent to Marine Corps Base Quantico. The remains of the town, now just a collection of homes, lies on a stretch of Va. 619, Joplin Road, approximately three miles west of Dumfries.

== See also ==
- Former counties, cities, and towns of Virginia
