= Noster =

Noster is a Latin adjective meaning "our", and may refer to:

== Geography ==
- Knob Noster is a city in Johnson County, Missouri, United States.
- Knob Noster State Park is a state park in the US state of Missouri.

== Religion ==
- Pater Noster is probably the best-known prayer in Christianity.

== See also ==
- Nostr, a social networking protocol
