= Orenda (disambiguation) =

Orenda may refer to

- Orenda, a spiritual concept
- The Orenda, a novel
- Orenda Books, a British publishing house
- Orenda Engines, a Canadian aircraft engine manufacturer, or several of their engine models
  - Orenda Iroquois engine
  - Orenda OE600
  - Orenda J79
- Orenda Fink, an American musician
- Orenda/SP-26 Historic District, Chopawamsic RDA Camp 3, a recreational demonstration camp
