= Possum Point =

Peninsula in Virginia, U.S.

Coordinates: 38°32′05″N 77°16′57″W

Possum Point is a small peninsula in Northern Virginia that juts out into Quantico Creek and separates it from the Potomac River. It lies in a suburban area of Washington D.C.

Dominion Virginia Power operates a power plant on the point. The area is rich in Civil War History, and a nearby peak, Possum Nose, was the site of a Confederate fort.

== Possum Point Power Station ==
Possum Point Power Station is a power plant owned by Dominion Virginia Power (A division of Dominion Resources). The plant supplies some of the electricity for the Northern Virginia suburbs of Washington D.C. It burns natural gas and oil, however it used to burn coal, and was converted in 2003. Unit 6, a combined cycle unit, was also installed in 2003. Unit 5 was scheduled for retirement by June 1, 2021. Units 3 & 4, previously converted from coal to natural gas, have been identified for retirement in a move away from steam generation.

=== Generating Units ===
Unit Number	Fuel	Notes
1	Coal	Retired
2	Coal	Retired
3	Natural Gas	Converted From Coal 2003
4	Natural Gas	Converted From Coal 2003
5	Oil	Uses #6 Low Sulfur Oil
6	Oil and Natural Gas	Combined Cycle unit, New in 2003

== Civil War History ==
Possum Nose was the site of one of many forts that were built along the Potomac River during the Civil War. It was named Cockpit Point Battery. "The Confederates effectively closed the Potomac to imports into Washington, D.C." It lies halfway between Freestone Point Battery in Leesylvania State Park and Quantico, Virginia.
