= Mawavi Historic District, Chopawamsic RDA Camp 2 =

Historic district in Virginia, United States

- U.S. National Register of Historic Places
- U.S. Historic district
- Virginia Landmarks Register
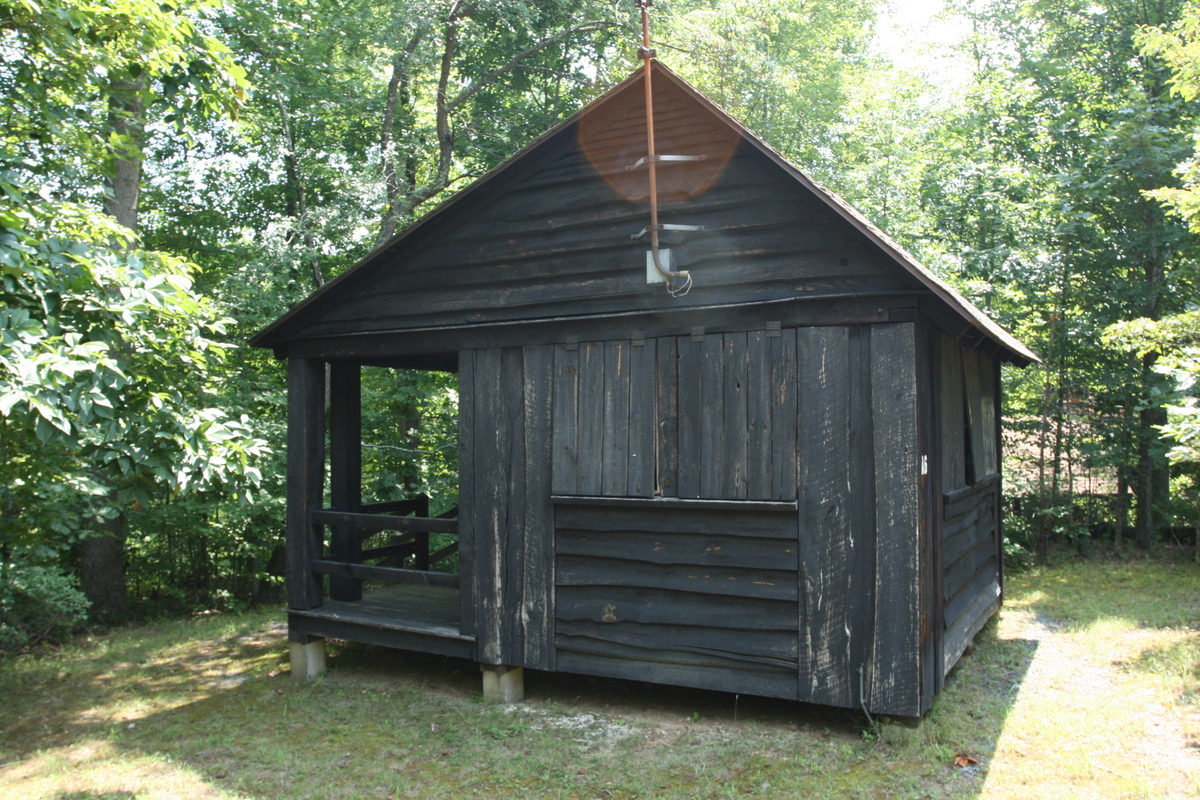
- one of 36 cabins

- Location within Northern Virginia Location within Virginia Location within the United States
- Nearest city: Triangle, Virginia
- Area: 132 acres (53 ha)
- Built: 1942
- Built by: CCC
- Architect: NPS
- Architectural style: NPS rustic architecture
- MPS: ECW Architecture at Prince William Forest Park 1933–1942 MPS
- NRHP reference No.: 89000457
- VLR No.: 076-0135

Significant dates
- Added to NRHP: June 12, 1989
- Designated VLR: September 20, 1988

The Mawavi Historic District, Chopawamsic RDA Camp 2 near Triangle, Virginia, United States, dates from 1942. It was listed on the National Register of Historic Places in 1989.

Landscaping and structures were designed by architects of the National Park Service; construction was done by Civilian Conservation Corps workers.

The 132-acre (53 ha) district is within what became the 16,084-acre (6,509 ha) Prince William Forest Park.

The NRHP listing included 56 contributing buildings, one contributing structure and one other contributing site.

The work was specifically designed by a cooperative effort of the NPS's Branch of Plans and Design in Washington, D.C., and by the NPS Branch of Planning and State Cooperation, Region 1, in Richmond. It included 36 cabins, a dining hall, various other buildings, and a dam that were built during 1936–1938.

The name "Mawavi" is a clipped compound of Maryland, Washington, D.C., and Virginia.

== See also ==
- Orenda/SP-26 Historic District, Chopawamsic RDA Camp 3, also NRHP-listed
