= Pater Noster (disambiguation) =

Pater Noster, or the Lord's Prayer, is a prayer in Christianity.

Pater Noster or Paternoster may also refer to:

== Places ==
- Paternoster, Western Cape, a fishing village in South Africa
- Paternosters, uninhabitable rocks in the Bailiwick of Jersey
- Paternoster (Estonian: Viirelaid), historical name of an island in the Baltic Sea

== Buildings ==
- Pater Noster Lighthouse, a Swedish lighthouse located in Skagerrak
- Church of the Pater Noster, a church on the Mount of Olives in Jerusalem

== Other uses ==
- Pater Noster (film), a 1993 Finnish drama film directed by Veikko Aaltonen
- Paternoster lift, a passenger elevator which consists of a chain of open compartments that move slowly in a loop up and down inside a building
- Paternoster beads, used in Christianity to recite the psalms
- Paternoster (surname), a surname
- Paternoster lake, one of a series of glacial lakes connected by a single stream or a braided stream system
- Paternoster Press, a British Christian publishing house
- Paternoster (sculpture), a 1975 bronze sculpture by Elisabeth Frink

== See also ==
- Paternoster Row, once the centre of the London publishing trade, destroyed during the Blitz, replaced by:
  - Paternoster Square, an urban development in London
- Paternoster Gang, a trio of recurring fictitious characters in the British science fiction television series Doctor Who, whose headquarters was on Paternoster Row
- Paternoster cross, repositioning the letters of the Sator Square
