= Breckenridge Reservoir =

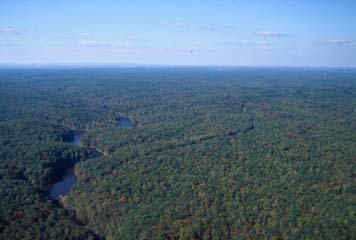

- Location within Virginia Location within the United States
- Location: Prince William / Stafford counties, Virginia, US
- Coordinates: 38°32′10″N 77°23′30″W
- Type: reservoir
- Primary inflows: Chopawamsic Creek
- Primary outflows: Chopawamsic Creek
- Basin countries: United States
- Max. length: 1 mi (1.6 km)
- Max. width: .1 mi (0.16 km)
- Surface area: 41.9 acres (17.0 ha)
- Water volume: 517 acre⋅ft (638,000 m^{3})
- Surface elevation: 132 ft (40 m)

Breckenridge Reservoir is a small reservoir on Chopawamsic Creek in Prince William and Stafford counties, Virginia. The reservoir's western shore is the Marine Corps Base Quantico and the eastern shore is a part of Prince William Forest Park, which is a unit of the National Park Service. The reservoir is open to fishing along with a Virginia fishing license and Marine Corps Base Quantico permit. Primitive campsites and a hiking trail are on the Prince William Forest Park side of the reservoir. Reservoir storage volume is approximately 22,500,000 cubic feet (517 acre-feet) with a surface area of about 1,820,000 square feet (41.9 acres).
