= Goldvein, Virginia =

Unincorporated community in Virginia, United States

- Unincorporated hamlet
- Location within Northern Virginia Location within Virginia Location within the United States
- Coordinates: 38°26′52.3″N 77°39′06.7″W
- Country: United States
- State: Virginia
- County: Fauquier
- Time zone: UTC−5 (Eastern (EST))
  - Summer (DST): UTC−4 (EDT)

Goldvein is an unincorporated hamlet in Fauquier County, Virginia, United States, running along US Route 17 and located approximately 16 miles (26 km) northwest of Fredericksburg and 20 miles (32 km) southeast of Warrenton. It has a population of approximately 200. It is home to the Gold Mining Camp Museum at Monroe Park. At one time, there were up to 18 active gold mines in the Goldvein area, although none of them are still active commercially.

== See also ==
- Gold mining in Virginia
