= Orenda/SP-26 Historic District, Chopawamsic RDA Camp 3 =

Historic district in Virginia, United States

- U.S. National Register of Historic Places
- U.S. Historic district
- Virginia Landmarks Register
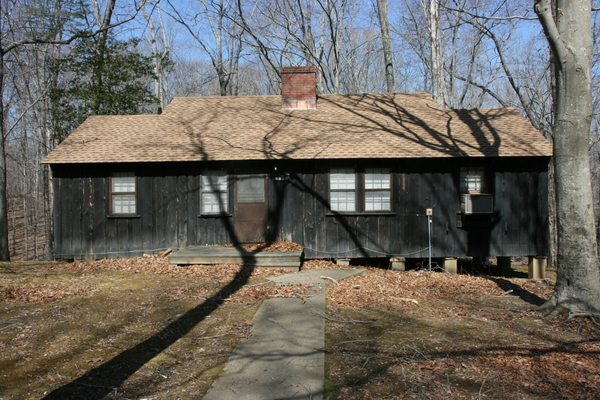

- Location within Northern Virginia Location within Virginia Location within the United States
- Nearest city: Triangle, Virginia
- Area: 179 acres (72 ha)
- Built: 1934
- Built by: Civilian Conservation Corps
- Architectural style: NPS rustic architecture
- MPS: ECW Architecture at Prince William Forest Park 1933–1942 MPS
- NRHP reference No.: 89000458
- VLR No.: 076-0136

Significant dates
- Added to NRHP: June 12, 1989
- Designated VLR: September 20, 1988

The Orenda/SP-26 Historic District, Chopawamsic RDA Camp 3, near Triangle, Virginia dates from 1934. It was a Recreational Demonstration Area camp that includes work designed by the National Park Service and built by the Civilian Conservation Corps. Building styles within the district include NPS rustic architecture.

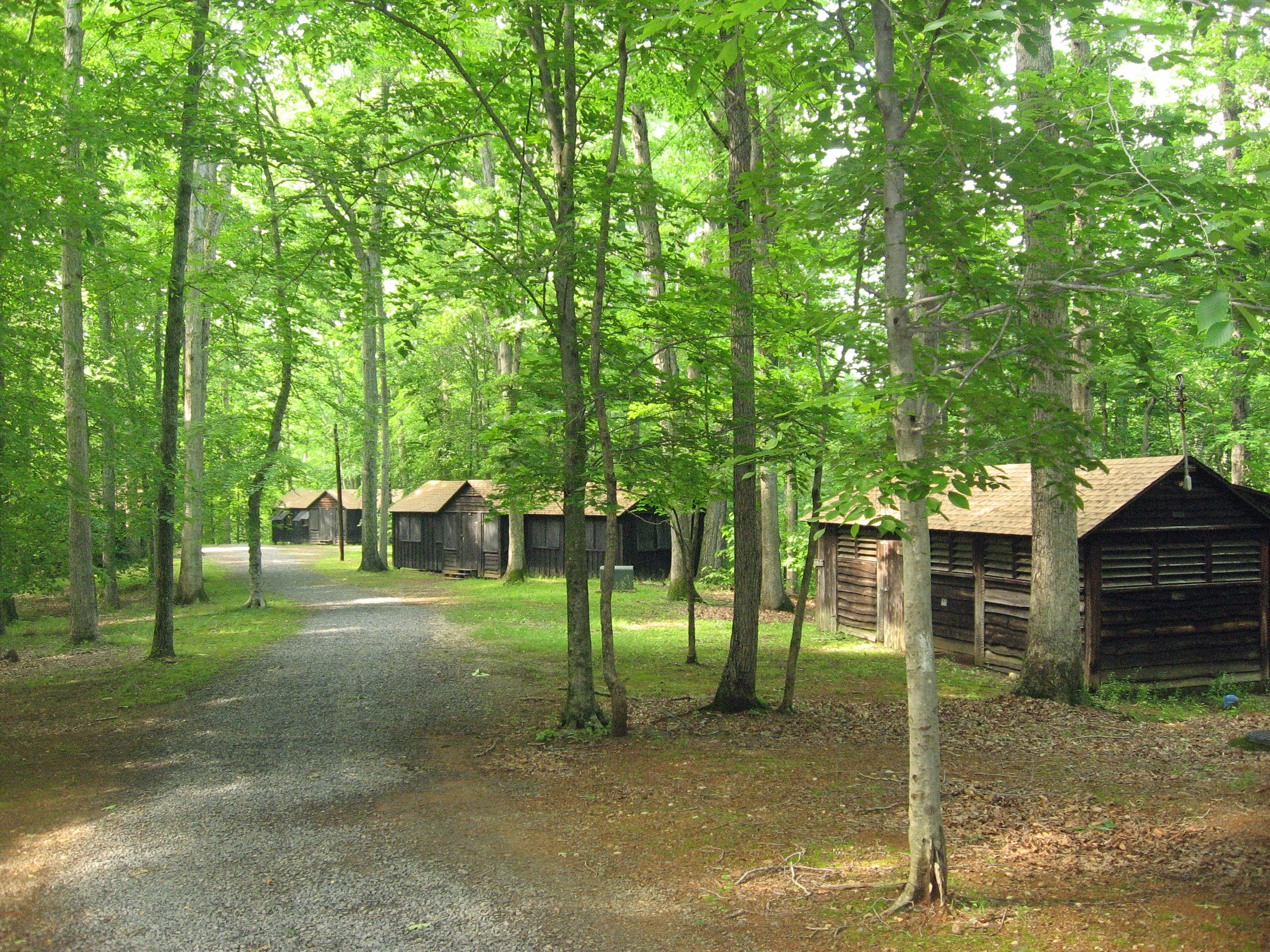

It is located within what would become Prince William Forest Park; it has also been known as Family Camp and Mothers & Tots' Camp.

When listed the historic district had 44 contributing buildings, 4 contributing structures and one contributing site.

== See also ==
- Chopawamsic RDA Camp 2, also NRHP-listed
