= Dumfries-Triangle, Virginia =

Coordinates: 38.557830°N 77.325468°W

Dumfries-Triangle was a census-designated place (then termed an unincorporated place) in Prince William County, Virginia, United States. Its first and only designation was at the 1950 United States census and consisted of the unincorporated communities of Dumfries and Triangle. It had a population of 1,585. Dumfries-Triangle was deleted at the 1960 census as Dumfries and Triangle were designated separately. As of the 2010 census, Dumfries and Triangle collectively have a population of 13,149.
