= Knob Noster State Park =

State park in Missouri, United States

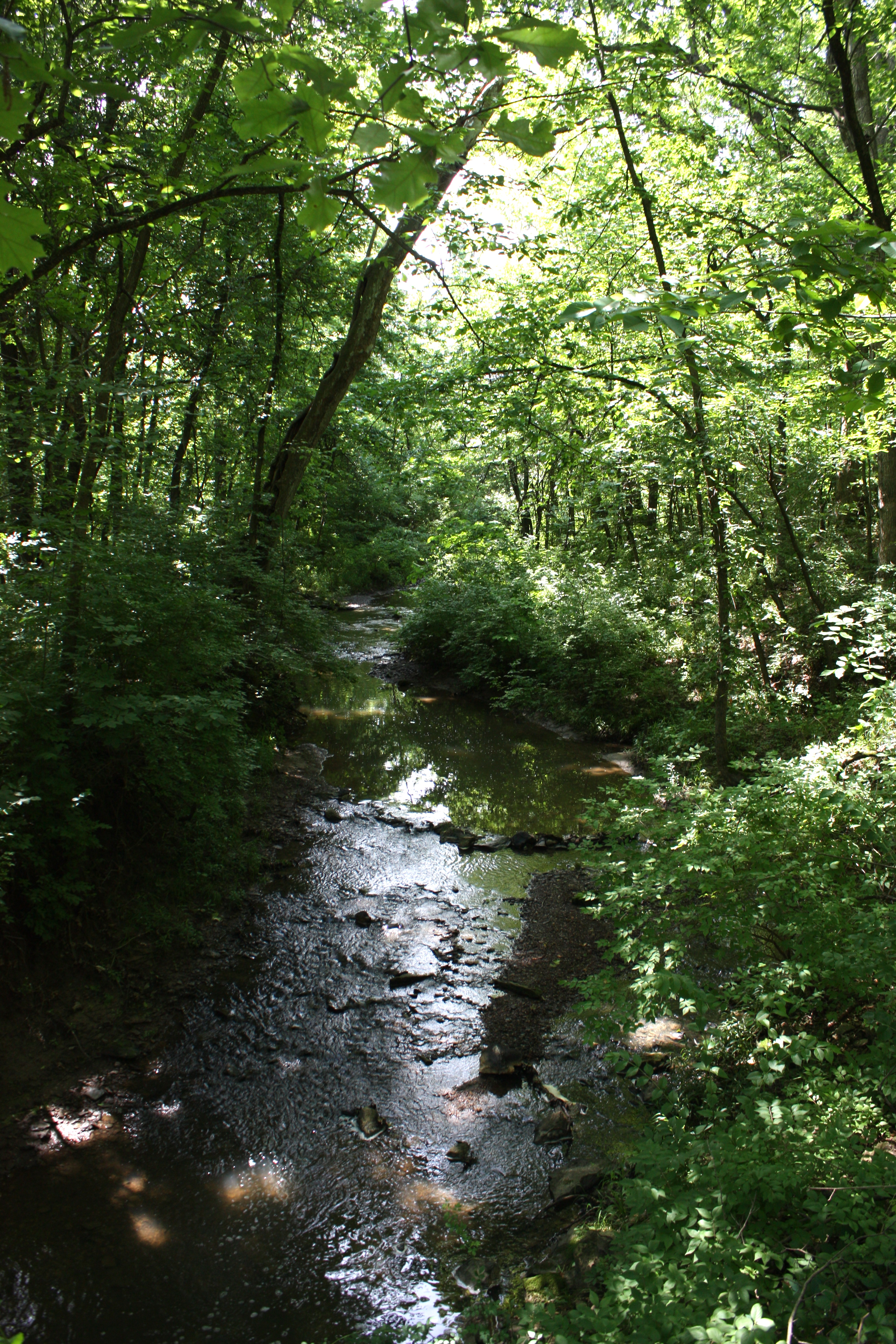

- Location within Missouri Location within the United States
- Location: Johnson County, Missouri, United States
- Nearest city: Knob Noster, Missouri
- Coordinates: 38°45′07″N 93°35′58″W
- Area: 3,934.38 acres (1,592.19 ha)
- Elevation: 735 ft (224 m)
- Established: 1935/36 (demonstration area); 1946 (state park)
- Administrator: Missouri Department of Natural Resources
- Visitors: 231,257 (in 2023)
- Website: Official website
- Camp Shawnee Historic District
- U.S. National Register of Historic Places
- U.S. Historic district
- Location: SW of Knob Noster, Knob Noster, Missouri
- Area: 215 acres (87 ha)
- Built: 1936
- Built by: WPA
- Architectural style: Rustic
- MPS: ECW Architecture in Missouri State Parks 1933-1942 TR
- NRHP reference No.: 85000506
- Added to NRHP: March 4, 1985
- Montserrat Recreation Demonstration Area Bridge
- U.S. National Register of Historic Places
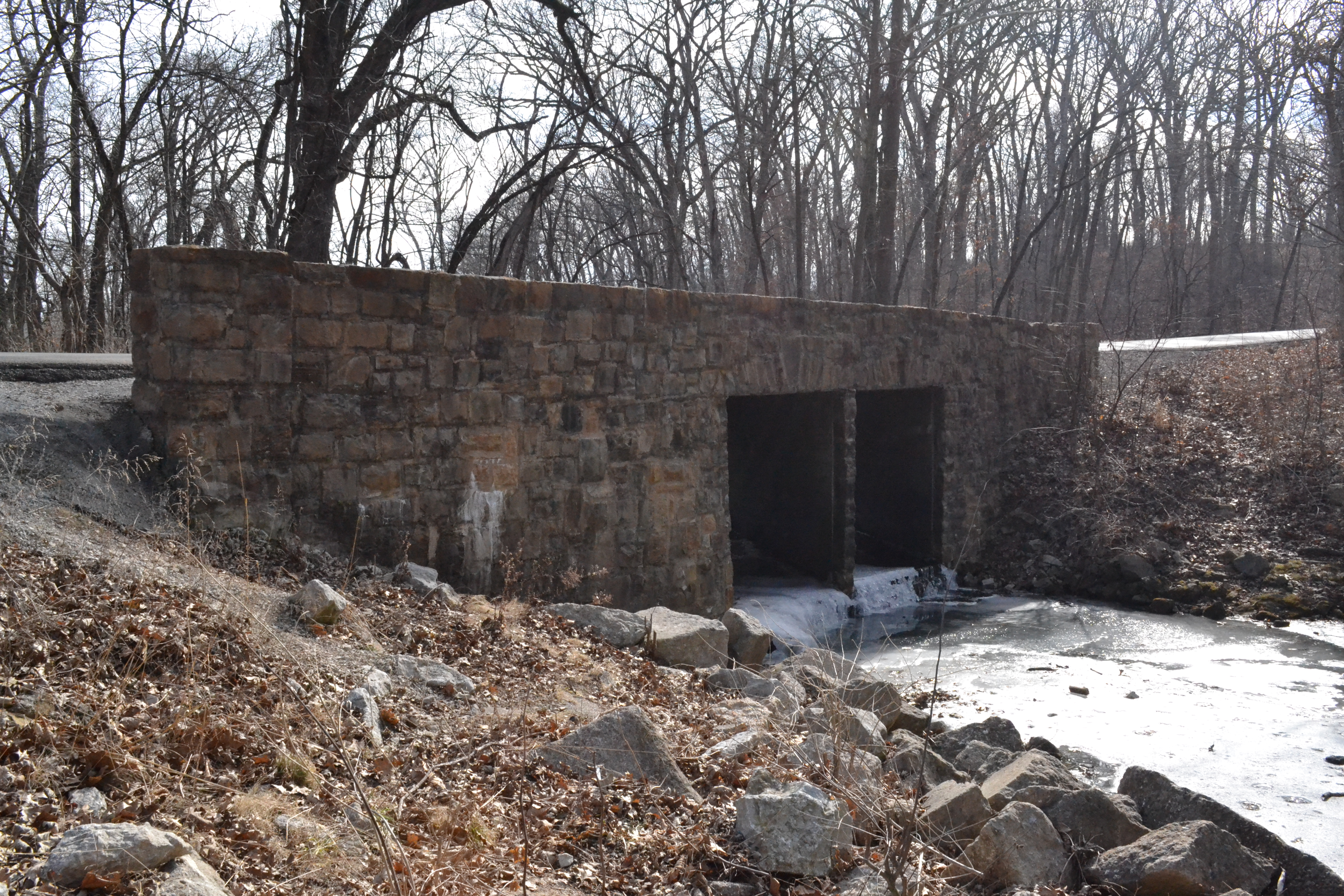
- Location: MO 132, Knob Noster, Missouri
- Area: Less than one acre
- Built: 1937
- Built by: WPA; NPS
- MPS: ECW Architecture in Missouri State Parks 1933-1942 TR
- NRHP reference No.: 85000507
- Added to NRHP: March 4, 1985
- Montserrat Recreation Demonstration Area Entrance Portal
- U.S. National Register of Historic Places
- Location: Off MO 132, Knob Noster, Missouri
- Area: Less than one acre
- Built: 1939
- Built by: WPA; NPS
- MPS: ECW Architecture in Missouri State Parks 1933-1942 TR
- NRHP reference No.: 85000509
- Added to NRHP: March 4, 1985
- Montserrat Recreation Demonstration Area Dam and Spillway
- U.S. National Register of Historic Places
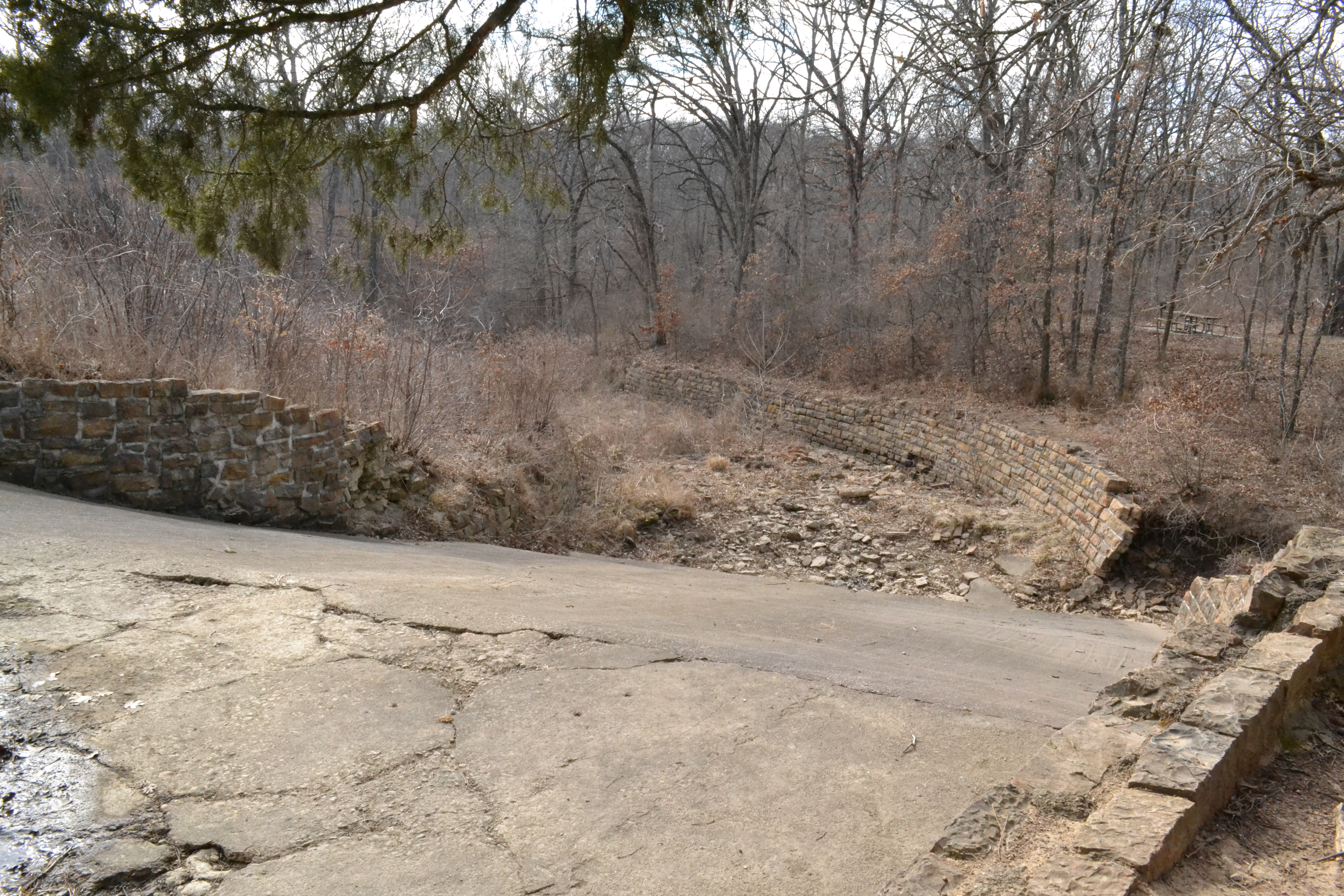
- Location: SW of Knob Noster, Knob Noster, Missouri
- Area: Less than one acre
- Built: 1938
- Built by: WPA; NPS
- MPS: ECW Architecture in Missouri State Parks 1933-1942 TR
- NRHP reference No.: 85000508
- Added to NRHP: March 4, 1985
- Montserrat Recreational Demonstration Area Rock Bath House
- U.S. National Register of Historic Places
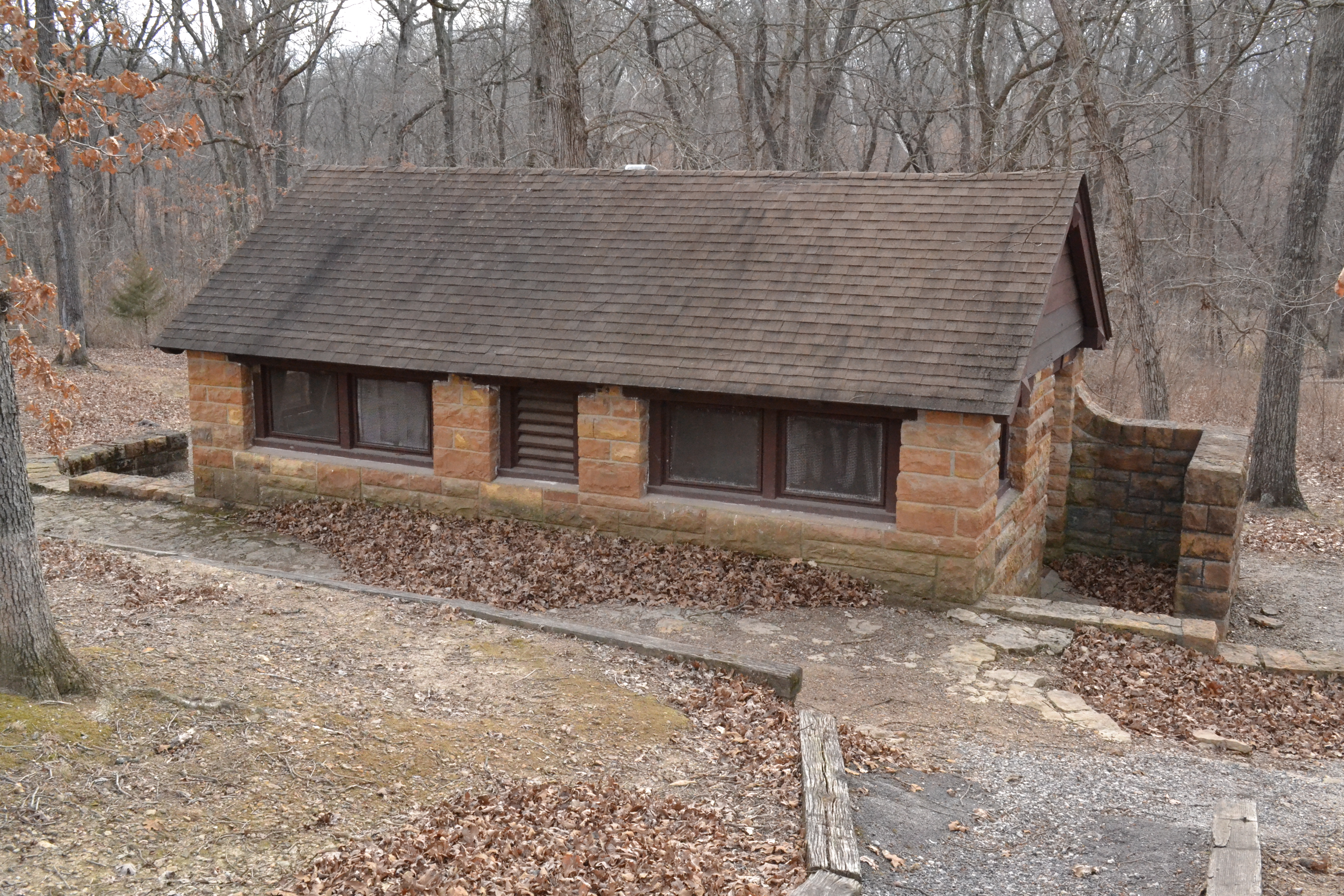
- Location: SW of Knob Noster, Knob Noster, Missouri
- Area: Less than one acre
- Built: 1939
- Built by: WPA; NPS
- MPS: ECW Architecture in Missouri State Parks 1933-1942 TR
- NRHP reference No.: 85000510
- Added to NRHP: March 4, 1985
- Montserrat Recreational Demonstration Area Warehouse #2 and Workshop
- U.S. National Register of Historic Places
- Location: Off MO 132, Knob Noster, Missouri
- Area: Less than one acre
- Built: 1939
- Built by: WPA; NPS
- Architectural style: Rustic
- MPS: ECW Architecture in Missouri State Parks 1933-1942 TR
- NRHP reference No.: 85000511
- Added to NRHP: March 4, 1985

Knob Noster State Park is a public recreation area covering 3,934 acres (1,592 ha) in Johnson County, Missouri, in the United States. The state park bears the name of the nearby town of Knob Noster, which itself is named for one of two small hills or "knobs" that rise up in an otherwise flat section of Missouri. Noster is a Latin adjective meaning "our"—therefore, Knob Noster translates as "our hill." A local Indian belief stated that the hills were "raised up as monuments to slain warriors." The park offers year-round camping, hiking, and fishing and is managed by the Missouri Department of Natural Resources.

== History ==
The park was called the Montserrat National Recreational Demonstration Area when it was created in the 1930s as part of a nationwide effort by the National Park Service to show how land that had been cleared for lumbering, mining or farming could be restored and reclaimed for public recreational purposes. The park was constructed by the Civilian Conservation Corps and the Works Progress Administration. The men of the CCC and WPA built roads, bridges, camping areas, picnic areas, and park service buildings. The park was transferred to the state of Missouri in 1946 and renamed for the city of Knob Noster.

== Historic sites ==
The park includes several demonstration area resources dating from the 1930s that were listed on the National Register of Historic Places in 1985:

- Camp Shawnee Historic District: The district encompasses 30 buildings and structures constructed between 1936 and 1941 by relief workers under the Works Projects Administration. They are large rectangular rustic style frame buildings with side-gable roofs in the saltbox form.
- Montserrat Recreational Demonstration Area Warehouse No. 2 and Workshop: The two buildings were built in 1939-1940 by relief workers under the Works Projects Administration. They include the pool house, dining hall, infirmary, staff lodges, office, central latrine, and four frame cabins.
- Montserrat Recreational Demonstration Area Rock Bath House: It was built in 1939 by relief workers under the Works Projects Administration. It is a modest stone building with a pitched side-gable roof and small hopper-style windows directly under the eave line.
- Montserrat Recreation Demonstration Area Entrance Portal: It was built in 1939 by relief workers under the Works Projects Administration. It consists of eight-foot retaining walls along a drainage ditch and two massive stone wing walls on either side of Highway 132.
- Montserrat Recreation Demonstration Area Dam and Spillway: It was built in 1938-1939 by relief workers under the Works Projects Administration to create a small recreational lake. It consists of a concrete dam with a curved ramp-like tailrace flanked by rustic walls of native cut stone and a flight of seven stone steps.
- Montserrat Recreation Demonstration Area Bridge: It was built in 1937 by relief workers under the Works Projects Administration. The bridge has two flat arches and a random ashlar wall surface.

== Ecology ==
The Knob Noster area was described in 1861 during the American Civil War by Confederate soldier, Ephraim McDowell Anderson, as an area of "beautiful prairies, dotted with clumps of trees." The park lies in the Osage Plains, a transition zone between prairie and forest. Tall wild grasses and wild flowers grow among scattered trees making habitat similar to a savanna. Since settlement, the savanna has been overgrown with trees as the land is transitioning to a forest. Efforts are underway to restore some parts of the park to its original condition through controlled burning.

Clearfork Creek is a slow flowing meandering creek that passes through the park. It provides water for a corridor of trees along its banks. The trees growing along the banks and in other parts of the park include pawpaw, various species of hickory and oak, hackberry and redbud. The creek, prairie and woods provide a habitat for numerous birds and mammals including great blue herons, pileated woodpeckers, wild turkeys, white-tailed deer, fox, opossum, raccoons, screech owls and eastern bluebirds.

A 4-acre (1.6 ha) section of the park has been specially designated as a protected natural area. Pin Oak Slough Natural Area is in a former oxbow slough of Clearfork Creek. The area is a wet-mesic forest and shrub swamp. Water pools during spring in depressions making vernal pools. Trees growing in the Pin Oak Natural Area include pin oak, swamp white oak and bur oak as well as silver maple. The rare pale green orchid can also be found in the natural area.

== Geology ==
Knob Noster State Park and the Osage Plains are underlain by soft shales with sandstones and limestones of Mississippian to Pennsylvanian age. Some of the rocks prevalent in the Osage Plains are Mississippian limestone, limestone shale, Ordovician dolomite, and coal. There are also clay and shale within the Pennsylvanian bedrock.

== Recreation ==
Knob Knoster State Park is open for year-round recreation. Two lakes, Buteo and Clearfork, and Clearfork Creek are open to fishing. The most common game fish are channel catfish, crappie, bass and bluegill. Small boats and electric trolling motors are permitted on the lakes. Several picnic areas are spread throughout the park on the shores of the various lakes. Three picnic pavilions are available. Five different types of camping areas are available at Knob Noster State Park. There are basic campsites with a fire ring and pad, electric campsites are similar to the basic, only with electric hook-ups, equestrian campsites have facilities for horses and the special-use and group camping areas are provided.
