= Greenwood Gold Mine =

Coordinates: 38°37′48″N 77°25′51″W

The Greenwood gold mine operated in Prince William County, Virginia, United States, near the town of Independent Hill for a few years before closing in 1885. It was one of two known gold mines in Prince William County, the other being the Crawford placer prospect on Neabsco Creek, near I-95, though small amounts of gold were occasionally found at the Cabin Branch Pyrite Mine in nearby Dumfries.

The Greenwood site was situated at the head of the North branch of Quantico Creek on what is now part of Prince William Forest Park near the intersection of Aden and Bristow Roads in the far northwestern area of the park. The site is situated along the Virginia Gold-Pyrite belt, which runs from northeast to southwest primarily through the counties of Fairfax, Prince William, Stafford, Spotsylvania, Buckingham, Culpeper, Cumberland, Fauquier, Floyd, Fluvanna, Goochland, Halifax, Louisa, Orange, and Patrick.

Mining operations consisted of at least one shaft, a stamp mill, and some form of mercury amalgamation recovery. The mine was a significant source of mercury pollution on Quantico Creek, and has since undergone complete reclamation including the sealing of mine shaft(s), soil removal and/or decontamination, and removal of obvious tailings. The area of the former mine is also monitored by an array of groundwater wells, which are maintained by the NPS. The USGS maintains two active monitoring wells downstream of the mine site on the South Fork of the Quantico Creek.

As of 2010, the only visible evidence of the mine are a few depressions in the soil. Engineered drainage structures from the reclamation efforts are visible. No intact structures or equipment remain. The National Park Service charges a fee for entry into the park and does not allow collecting of rocks or minerals.

== See also ==
- Virginia gold mining
