= Gold mining in Virginia =

Most gold mining in Virginia was concentrated in the Virginia Gold-Pyrite belt in a line that runs northeast to southwest through the counties of Fairfax, Prince William, Stafford, Fauquier, Culpeper, Spotsylvania, Orange, Louisa, Fluvanna, Goochland, Cumberland, and Buckingham. Some gold was also mined in Halifax, Floyd, and Patrick counties.

== History of Virginia gold mining ==
The earliest recording of gold mining activity in Virginia began about 1804 as placer mining, followed quickly by lode mining. Mining continued unabated until the onset of the California Gold Rush, at which point most serious speculators moved west. Production continued at a low level until the Civil War, when it virtually ground to a halt.

Near the end of the war, Union troops began a systematic campaign to destroy the economic base of the South. Many gold mines were subsequently damaged beyond repair. Most were, by this time, marginal producers, their ores of such low concentrate as to stretch the limits of the mercury amalgam (chemistry) recovery technology of the day. Many of these mines never reopened.

Other mines did, however, and gold production in Virginia continued until World War II, when, on October 8, 1942, the War Production Board issued Limitation Order L-208, which branded gold production as a non-essential and directed all but the smallest of gold mines to shut down so their labor force could be used elsewhere to support the war effort.

Economic conditions following the war were such that few miners returned to mining, so only a handful of mines reopened. For all practical purposes, commercial gold production in Virginia ceased after 1948.

At its peak, Virginia was the third largest gold producing state, and the heart of the gold production area was at the junction of Spotsylvania, Culpeper, Greene near Wood Dr., and Orange counties near Wilderness.

=== Modern era ===
More than 300 prospects and mines are known to have existed in Virginia, yet very few, if any at all, are commercially active at this time. Amateur and hobby prospecting continues to this day, primarily consisting of individual or small scale placer operations. Many hobbyists simply use a gold pan or a sluice box.

== Museums and displays about gold mining ==
- Lake Anna State Park contains the remnants of the Goodwin mine and some historical displays. Gold panning is permitted on the park grounds.
- Monroe Park in Goldvein has a museum about gold mining operations in the area, with some reconstructed buildings and historical artifacts.

== List of gold mines, claims, and prospects ==
Since most commercial gold activity ceased in the late 1940s, records are scant. This list is not complete. quadrangles are USGS 7.5 minute quads and the coordinates are UTM.

=== Mines in Buckingham County ===
- Anaconda mine
  - Quadrangle: Dillwyn
  - Location: N 4,165,950 E 729,000 (Zone 17)
- Anderson mine
  - Quadrangle: Andersonville
  - Location:N 4,149,050 E 715,050 (Zone 17)
- Apperson mine
  - Quadrangle: Dillwyn
  - Location: N 4,160,830 E 724,830 (Zone 17)
- Bondurant mine
  - Quadrangle: Andersonville
  - Location:N 4,147,630 E 713,180 (Zone 17)
- Buckingham (Wiseman) mine
  - Quadrangle: Dillwyn
  - Location: N 4,158,740 E 723,820 (Zone 17)
- Burnett (Staples) mine
  - Quadrangle: Dillwyn
  - Location: N 4,160,010 E 724,400 (Zone 17)
- Copal (Kopall) mine
  - Quadrangle: Andersonville
  - Location: N 4,147,580 E 715,500 (Zone 17)
- Duncan mine
  - Quadrangle: Dillwyn
  - Location: N 4,163,050 E 726,150 (Zone 17)
- Flood (James Anderson's) mine
  - Quadrangle: Andersonville
  - Location: N 4,146.340 E 712.190 (Zone 17)
- Ford mine
  - Quadrangle: Diana Mills
  - Location: N 4,174,840 E 730,820 (Zone 17)
- Gilliam mine
  - Quadrangle: Andersonville
  - Location: N 4,145,400 E 711,420 (Zone 17)
- Greelsy (Ayers) mine
  - Quadrangle: Dillwyn
  - Location: N 4,162,120 E 730,510 (Zone 17)
- Hudgins mine
  - Quadrangle: Arvonia
  - Location: N 4,173,530 E 737,360 (Zone 17)
- Lightfoot (Cowan) mine
  - Quadrangle: Diana Mills
  - Location: N 4,175,860 E 731,370 (Zone 17)
- London and Virginia mine
  - Quadrangle: Dillwyn
  - Location: N 4,418,860 E 723,980 (Zone 17)
- Morrow (Booker, Garnett, Moseley) mine
  - Quadrangle: Willis Mountain
  - Location: N 4,152,590 E 721,570 (Zone 17)
- Morton (Hobson) mine
  - Quadrangle: Dillwyn
  - Location: N 4,166,920 E 728,800 (Zone 17)
- Philadelphia (Allen)mine
  - Quadrangle: Dillwyn
  - Location: Near the London and Virginia mine.
- Rough and Ready mine
  - Quadrangle: Dillwyn
  - Location:N 4,166,270 E 728,470 (Zone 17)
- Seay mine
  - Quadrangle: Willis Mountain
  - Location:N 4,152,770 E 721,350 (Zone 17)
- Williams mine
  - Quadrangle: Dillwyn
  - Location:N 4,158,070 E 723,130 (Zone 17)
- Willis Creek mine
  - Quadrangle: Andersonville
  - Location:N 4,146,230 E 710,500 (Zone 17)
- Mines with insufficient data
  - Piedmont mine
  - Walker mine

=== Mines in Carroll County ===
- Woodlawn mine
  - Quadrangle: Woodlawn
  - Location: N 4,063,540 E 515,020 (Zone 17)

=== Mines in Culpeper County ===
- Childsburg (Childsbury) mine
  - Quadrangle: Richardsville
  - Location: N 4,255,260 E 263,870 (Zone 18)
- Cromarty mine
  - Quadrangle: Richardsville
  - Location: N 4,253,500 E 264,790 (Zone 18)
- Culpeper (Hempstead) mine
  - Quadrangle: Chancellorsville
  - Location: N 4,250,700 E 262,790 (Zone 18)
- Dry Bottom mine
  - Quadrangle: Richardsville
  - Location: N 4,251,940 E 265,010 (Zone 18)
- Eagle mine
  - Quadrangle: Richardsville
  - Location: N 4,251,530 E 263,720 (Zone 18)
- Ellis (Eley) mine
  - Quadrangle: Richardsville
  - Location: N 4,254,840 E 264,930 (Zone 18)
- Embrey (Embry, Embry and Brooks) mine
  - Quadrangle: Chancellorsville
  - Location: N 4,250,230 E 263,120 (Zone 18)
- Field's mine
  - Quadrangle: Germanna Bridge
  - Location: N 4,255,760 E 259,790 (Zone 18)
- Greeley Horace mine
  - Quadrangle: Richardsville
  - Location: N 4,251,330 E 263,520 (Zone 18)
- Hill mine
  - Quadrangle: Castleton
  - Location: N 4,265,890 E 760,320 (Zone 17)
- Love mine
  - Quadrangle: Richardsville
  - Location: N 4,251,560 E 263,060 (Zone 18)
- Milbank (Millbank) mine
  - Quadrangle: Richardsville
  - Location: East-northeast of Richardsville, south of the Rappahannock River.
- Morganna (Morgana) mine
  - Quadrangle: Richardsville
  - Location: N 4,255,490 E 266,300 (Zone 18)
- Ricardsville mine
  - Quadrangle: Richardsville
  - Location: Near Richardsville
- Rossin's (Rossin's Mountain) mine
  - Quadrangle: Richardsville
  - Location: N 4,252,260 E 262,600 (Zone 18)
- Smith mine
  - Quadrangle: Chancellorsville
  - Location: N 4,250,490 E 264,450 (Zone 18)
- Urquhart mine
  - Quadrangle: Richardsville
  - Location: N 4,254,490 E 264,450 (Zone 18)
- Mines that had insufficient data
  - Enterprise
  - Everlasting
  - Pennsylvania

=== Mines in Cumberland County ===
- Dickey, C. S. mine
  - Quadrangle: Lakeside Village
  - Location: N 4,175,660 E 751,780 (Zone 17)

=== Mines in Fairfax County ===
- Bull Neck (Kirk) mine
  - Quadrangle: Falls Church
  - Location: N 4,315,060 E 307,990 (Zone 18)

=== Mines in Fauquier County ===
Fauquier County's Gold Mining Museum at Monroe Park

- Bancroft (Bancroff) mine (2 mines)
  - Quadrangle: Richardsville
  - Location: N 4,262,340 E 262,680 / N 4,261,490 E 263,260 (Zone 18)
- Cool Spring (Stringfellow) mine
  - Quadrangle: Richardsville
  - Location: N 4,260,180 E 266,920 (Zone 18)
- Embrey mine
  - Quadrangle: Midland
  - Location: N 4,264,900 E 264,190 (Zone 18)
- Emigold mine
  - Quadrangle: Richardsville
  - Location: Near Goldvein, Va
- Franklin (Deep Run) mine
  - Quadrangle: Midland
  - Location: 4,264,710 E 267,970 (Zone 18)
  - First mine in the county, opened in 1825.
- Gamewood mine
  - Quadrangle: Richardsville
  - Location: N 4,261,890 (Zone 18)
- Johnston mine
  - Quadrangle: Richardsville
  - Location: N 4,256,800 E 268,140 (Zone 18)
- Kelly (Kelley)mine
  - Quadrangle: Richardsville
  - Location: N 4,260,340 E 260,100 (Zone 18)
- Kidwell mine
  - Quadrangle: Richardsville
  - Location: N 4,258,130 E 260,830 (Zone 18)
- Kirk mine
  - Quadrangle: Richardsville
  - Location: N 4,264,060 E 267,680 (Zone 18)
- Liberty mine
  - Quadrangle: Richardsville
  - Location: N 4,259,310 E 266,380 (Zone 18)
- Liepold (Leopold, Stone) mine
  - Quadrangle: Richardsville
  - Location: N 4,263,940 E 263,970 (Zone 18)
- Little Elliot mine
  - Quadrangle: Richardsville
  - Location: N 4,260,450 E 266,450 (Zone 18)
- Pine View mine
  - Quadrangle: Richardsville
  - Location: N 4,259,640 E 265,380 (Zone 18)
- Pollard (Polland) mine
  - Quadrangle: Richardsville
  - Location: N 4,261,520 E 261,360 (Zone 18)
- Randolph (Sugar) mine
  - Quadrangle: Richardsville
  - Location: N 4,260,940 E 266,210 (Zone 18)
- Union mine
  - Quadrangle: Richardsville
  - Location: N 4,258,030 E 265,730 (Zone 18)
- Waterman mine
  - Quadrangle: Midland
  - Location: N 4,264,470 E 267,570 (Zone 18)
- Wykoff (Wycoff, Quartz) mine
  - Quadrangle: Richardsville
  - Location: N 4,263,020 E 266,640 (Zone 18)

=== Mines in Floyd County ===
- Black Run mine
  - Quadrangle: Floyd
  - Location: About 4.5 miles (7.2 km) northwest of Floyd, in the stream bed of Black run (unable to locate), which empties into Little River, off the northwest side of State Highway 8.
- Brush Creek mine
  - Quadrangle: Pilot
  - Location: N 4,100,810 E 561,200 (Zone 17)
- Laurel Creek mine
  - Quadrangle: Pilot
  - Location: N 4,097,270 E 560,250 (Zone 17)
- McAlexander, Lester (Luster) mine
  - Quadrangle: Alum Ridge
  - Location: About 4.5 miles (7.2 km) northeast of Alum Ridge, just off the west side of State Road 617 approximately 0.75 miles (1.21 km) by road north of its intersection with State Highway 8.

=== Mines in Fluvanna County ===
- Bartlett mine
  - Quadrangle: Columbia
  - Location: About 5 miles (8.0 km) north of Columbia on Bartlett Branch, a tributary off the east side of Byrd Creek, approximately 0.5 miles (0.80 km) northwest of the intersection of Byrd Creek (at old Bowles bridge) with State Road 605.
- Bowles mine
  - Quadrangle: Caledonia
  - Location: N 4,194,540 E 755,890 (Zone 17)
- Cassell's mine
  - Quadrangle: Columbia
  - Location: N 4,191,490 E 751,390 (Zone 17)
- Cocke mine
  - Quadrangle: Columbia
  - Location: N 4,188,600 E 751,060 (Zone 17)
- Fountain mine
  - Quadrangle: Columbia
  - Location: N 4,189,630 E 751,990 (Zone 17)
- Hughes mine
  - Quadrangle: Palmyra
  - Location: N 4,185,510 E 738,510 (Zone 17)
- Jennings mine
  - Quadrangle: Caledonia
  - Location: N 4,191,320 E 753,710 (Zone 17)
- Marks, Lemuel mine
  - Quadrangle: Columbia
  - Location: N 4,190,560 E 752,960 (Zone 17)
- McGloam mine
  - Quadrangle: Caledonia
  - Location: N 4,193,320 E 754,840 (Zone 17)
- Mosby mine
  - Quadrangle: Columbia
  - Location: N 4,190,110 E 752,590 (Zone 17)
- Page mine
  - Quadrangle: Columbia
  - Location: N 4,192,390 E 743,960 (Zone 17)
  - Previous User contribution:(Believe this should be the "Long Island Mine", named after the Long Island Creek in Fluvanna where it was located. It was established by George Pace in the 1830s, and thus is also commonly called "the Pace Mine".)
- Prospect A
  - Quadrangle: Caledonia
  - Location: N 4,190,920 E 753,780 (Zone 17)
- Prospect B
  - Quadrangle: Caledonia
  - Location: N 4,190,420 E 753,680 (Zone 17)
- Scotia (Hodges vein) mine
  - Quadrangle: Caledonia
  - Location: N 4,190,740 E 754,090 (Zone 17)
- Scotia (Perkins, Telluruim Vein) mine
  - Quadrangle: Caledonia
  - Location: N 4,191,920 E 754,410 (Zone 17)
- Shaw (2 mines) mine
  - Quadrangle: Caledonia
  - Location: N 4,194,260 E 755,130 / N 4,195,130 E 755,150 (Zone 17)
- Snead mine
  - Quadrangle: Palmyra
  - Location: N 4,184,760 E 741,590 (Zone 17)
- Stockton Tunnel mine
  - Quadrangle: Columbia
  - Location: N 4,193,840 E 744,450 (Zone 17)
- Tellurium mine
  - Quadrangle: Caledonia
  - Location: N 4,192,220 E 754,650 (Zone 17)
- Mines that had insufficient data
  - Chalk Level

=== Mines in Goochland County ===
- Atmore (Admore) mine
  - Quadrangle: Caledonia
  - Location: N 4,188,140 E 754,470 (Zone 17)
- Belzord (Belzora, Belzow) mine
  - Quadrangle: Caledonia
  - Location: N 4,188,850 E 756,170 (Zone 17)
- Benton mine
  - Quadrangle: Caledonia
  - Location: N 4,194,810 E 758,690 (Zone 17)
- Bertha and Edith (2 mines) mine
  - Quadrangle: Caledonia / Columbia
  - Location: N 4,185,880 E 753,100 / N 4,187,300 E 753,100 (Zone 17)
- Big Bird mine
  - Quadrangle: Caledonia
  - Location: N 4,188,670 E 756,130 (Zone 17)
- Bowles (Boles) mine
  - Quadrangle: Caledonia
  - Location: N 4,192,580 E 755,360 (Zone 17)
- Busby (Busbee, Groom) mine
  - Quadrangle: Caledonia
  - Location: N 4,193,110 E 756,980 (Zone 17)
- Chatlier mine
  - Quadrangle: Caledonia
  - Location: N 4,191,720 E 754,900 (Zone 17)
- Collins mine
  - Quadrangle: Caledonia
  - Location: N 4,189,130 E 757,160 (Zone 17)
  - the first gold mine in Goochland county
- Dillard mine
  - Quadrangle: Columbia
  - Location: About 2.65 miles (4.26 km) northeast of Columbia, along the west side of Byrd Creek, 0.55 miles (0.89 km) north of State Road 667 from a point approximately 0.35 miles (0.56 km) by State Road 667 west of its crossing over Byrd Creek.
- Duke mine
  - Quadrangle: Caledonia
  - Location: N 4,188,670 E 755,580 (Zone 17)
- Eades mine
  - Quadrangle: Caledonia
  - Location: N 4,188,670 E 756,130 (Zone 17)
- Fisher mine
  - Quadrangle: Caledonia
  - Location: N 4,191,260 E 755,750 (Zone 17)
- Fleming (Hodge's) mine
  - Quadrangle: Caledonia
  - Location: N 4,194,730 E 759,000 (Zone 17)
- Goochland mine
  - Quadrangle: Caledonia
  - Location: Around the headwaters of Little Byrd Creek.
- Grannison (2 mines) mine
  - Quadrangle: Caledonia
  - Location: N 4,189,060 E 754,030 / N 4,188,690 E 754,520 (Zone 17)
- Johnson, David mine
  - Quadrangle: Caledonia
  - Location: N 4,190,000 E 756,490 (Zone 17)
- Kent (2 mines) mine
  - Quadrangle: Caledonia
  - Location: N 4,187,970 E 753,750 / N 4,187,600 E 753,750 (Zone 17)
- Laury mine
  - Quadrangle: Caledonia
  - Location: N 4,188,670 E 756,130 (Zone 17)
- Marks, Lancelot mine
  - Quadrangle: Caledonia
  - Location: N 4,188,670 E 756,130 (Zone 17)
- Massachusetts mine
  - Quadrangle: Caledonia
  - Location: Within 0.5 miles (0.80 km) of the Terllurium mine.
- Morgan (Robert Hughes) mine
  - Quadrangle: Caledonia
  - Location: N 4,189,370 E 755,920 (Zone 17)
- Moss mine
  - Quadrangle: Caledonia
  - Location: N 4,192,720 E 756,450 (Zone 17)
- Omohundro mine
  - Quadrangle: Caledonia
  - Location: N 4,190,320 E 756,260 (Zone 17)
- Payne mine
  - Quadrangle: Caledonia
  - Location: N 4,193,690 E 757,620 (Zone 17)
- Prospect A
  - Quadrangle: Caledonia
  - Location: N 4,193,280 E 756,590 (Zone 17)
- Prospect B
  - Quadrangle: Caledonia
  - Location: N 4,193,100 E 756,280 (Zone 17)
- Prospect C
  - Quadrangle: Caledonia
  - Location: N 4,192,250 E 755,480 (Zone 17)
- Pryor (Pryer) mine
  - Quadrangle: Caledonia
  - Location: N 4,192,230 E 757,230 (Zone 17)
- Ruth
  - Quadrangle: Columbia
  - Location: About 2.7 miles (4.3 km) northeast of Columbia, along and on both sides of a stream flowing southward and near its confluence with Byrd Creek, about 0.65 miles (1.05 km) north of State Road 667 from a point approximately 0.35 miles (0.56 km) by road west of its crossing over Byrd Creek.
- Shannon Hill mine
  - Quadrangle: Caledonia
  - Location: N 4,195,680 E 760,100 (Zone 17)
- Tellurium (Fisher, Hughes, Red) mine
  - Quadrangle: Caledonia
  - Location: N 4,192,420 E 755,030 (Zone 17)
  - where it is believed that the first stamp mill in the U.S. operated
- Thompson, John mine
  - Quadrangle: Caledonia
  - Location: N 4,189,530 E 756,340 (Zone 17)
- Toler mine
  - Quadrangle: Caledonia
  - Location: N 4,188,720 E 755,900 (Zone 17)
- Waller mine
  - Quadrangle: Caledonia
  - Location: N 4,193,910 E 759,090 (Zone 17)
- Young American (Gilmer, Gilmore) (2 mines) mine
  - Quadrangle: Caledonia
  - Location: N 4,190,010 E 756,240 / N 4,189,900 E 756,010 (Zone 17)
- Mines that had insufficient data
  - Argus mine
  - Banks mine
  - Johnson, Benjamin mine
  - Manning mine
  - McGee mine
  - Moon Sea mine
  - Nicholas mine
  - Pace mine
  - Richmond mine
  - Taugus mine
  - Tyler mine
  - Walters mine

=== Mines in Halifax County ===
- Luce and Howard (Howard, Tallyhill) mine
  - Quadrangle: Nelson
  - Location: N 4,052,860 E 701,730 (Zone 17)
- Poole and Harris (Pool) mine
  - Quadrangle: Nelson
  - Location: N 4,050,120 E 701,770 (Zone 17)
- Red Bank (Goldbank) mine
  - Quadrangle: Nelson
  - Location: N 4,052,590 E 701,700 (Zone 17)

=== Mines in Loudoun County ===
- Loudoun mine
  - Quadrangle: Harpers Ferry
  - Location: About 2.3 miles (3.7 km) north-northwest of Lovettsville, on the right bank of Dutchman Creek where it empties into the Potomac River.

=== Mines in Louisa County ===
- Allah Cooper (Ali Cooper, Valcooper, Alley-Cooper) mine
  - Quadrangle: Lake Anna West
  - Location: N 4,217,670 E 249,180 (Zone 18)
- Belden mine
  - Quadrangle: Mineral
  - Location: N 4,211,570 E 249,180 (Zone 18)
- Bibb mine
  - Quadrangle: Mineral
  - Location: N 4,210,130 E 246,440 (Zone 18)
- Boxley's mine
  - Quadrangle: Lake Anna West
  - Location: About 5.4 miles (8.7 km) northeast of Mineral, just north of and now in the flooded area of Contrary Creek, just west of its intersection with State Road 652.
- Chick mine
  - Quadrangle: Mineral
  - Location: N 4,210,880 E 246,880 (Zone 18)
- Cooper mine
  - Quadrangle: Mineral
  - Location: N 4,213,140 E 245,430 (Zone 18)
- Harris mine
  - Quadrangle: Mineral
  - Location: N 4,210,310 E 246,560 (Zone 18)
- Jenkins mine
  - Quadrangle: Lake Anna West
  - Location: N 4,216,520 E 248,960 (Zone 18)
- Lett mine
  - Quadrangle: Mineral
  - Location: N 4,212,080 E 244,880 (Zone 18)
- Louisa mine
  - Quadrangle: Pendleton
  - Location: N 4,207,490 E 245,280 (Zone 18)
- Luce mine
  - Quadrangle: Pendleton
  - Location: N 4,208,410 E 245,260 (Zone 18)
- MacDonald mine
  - Quadrangle: Pendleton
  - Location: N 4,209,180 E 242,560 (Zone 18)
- Morriston mine
  - Quadrangle: Mineral
  - Location: N 4,210,720 E 246,800 (Zone 18)
- New Luce mine
  - Quadrangle: Pendleton
  - Location: N 4,209,020 E 245,670 (Zone 18)
- Proffit mine
  - Quadrangle: Pendleton
  - Location: N 4,206,950 E 243,670 (Zone 18)
- Ricswan mine
  - Quadrangle: Pendleton
  - Location: N 4,207,690 E 244,490 (Zone 18)
- Slate Hill mine
  - Quadrangle: Pendleton
  - Location: N 4,207,930 E 244,740 (Zone 18)
- Stockton mine
  - Quadrangle: Mineral
  - Location: N 4,210,780 E 246,780 (Zone 18)
- Thomasson's mine
  - Quadrangle: Pendleton
  - Location: N 4,205,840 E 242,640 (Zone 18)
- Tinder (Tinder Flats) mine
  - Quadrangle: Lake Anne West
  - Location: N 4,216,660 E 248,020 (Zone 18)
- Triple Fork mine
  - Quadrangle: Mineral
  - Location: About 1.15 miles (1.85 km) north of mineral, 0.525 miles (0.845 km) off the northwest side od US.S. Highway 522 approximately 0.675 miles (1.086 km) bt road northeast of its intersection with State Road 667.
- Twin Vein mine
  - Quadrangle: Pendleton
  - Location: About 2.0 to 3.0 miles (3.2 to 4.8 km) southwest of Mineral; according to the Spotsylvania County Deed Books, the mine is located on the old R.E. Dolan property known as the Louisa Gold Company Land tract comprising 766 arces, which includes the Waddy tract and the 104-acre (0.42 km^{2}) Waldorf tract; near the property of Lewis Thomasson on and along the old Richmond Road (U.S. Highway 33)
- Walnut Grove mine
  - Quadrangle: Pendleton
  - Location: N 4,205,640 E 242,480 (Zone 18)
- Walton mine
  - Quadrangle: Mineral
  - Location: N 4,212,810 E 245,180 (Zone 18)
- Warren Hill mine
  - Quadrangle: -
  - Location: On the "Fisher Lode"
- Mines by another user contributions
  - Armenious mine, located somewhere near Mineral, location uncertain
  - Dolan mine
  - Hemmer mine, located about 0.5 miles (0.80 km) north of Mineral
  - Hunter prospect, located about 0.2 miles (0.32 km) NW of Mineral south of SR-22
  - Josh mine, located about 1-mile (1.6 km) SW of Yanceyville

=== Mines in Montgomery County ===
- Brush Creek mine
  - Quadrangle: Pilot
  - Location: N 4,100,370 E 560,420 (Zone 17)

=== Mines in Orange County ===
- Ambler mine
  - Quadrangle: Chancellorsville
  - Location: N 4,244,510 E 260,150 (Zone 18)
- Dickey mine
  - Quadrangle: Mine Run
  - Location: N 4,240,540 E 249,650 (Zone 18)
- Gordon's, H (2 mines) mine
  - Quadrangle: -
  - Location: N 4,247,870 E 258,640 / N 4,247,540 E 258,480 (Zone 18)
- Grasty mine
  - Quadrangle: Mine Run
  - Location: N 4,240,470 E 249,470 (Zone 18)
- Greenwood (Laird) mine
  - Quadrangle: Chancellorsville
  - Location: N 4,247,180 E 261,930 (Zone 18)
- Jones mine
  - Quadrangle: Mine Run
  - Location: N 4,248,500 E 254,140 (Zone 18)
- Melville (Rapidan) mine
  - Quadrangle: Chancellorsville
  - Location: N 4,249,140 E 261,930 (Zone 18)
- Old Tinder mine
  - Quadrangle: Mine Run
  - Location: N 4,240,350 E 249,370 (Zone 18)
- Orange Grove mine
  - Quadrangle: Mine Run
  - Location: N 4,246,420 E 258,070 (Zone 18)
- Partridge mine
  - Quadrangle: Chancellorsville
  - Location: N 4,248,830 E 259,860 (Zone 18)
- Prospect A mine
  - Quadrangle: Chancellorsville
  - Location: N 4,244,790 E 260,390 (Zone 18)
- Saunders (2 mines) mine
  - Quadrangle: Lahore
  - Location: N 4,235,290 E 245,470 (Zone 18)
- Seldon mine
  - Quadrangle: Lahore
  - Location: N 4,235,330 E 248,270 (Zone 18)
- Somerville mine
  - Quadrangle: Chancellorsville
  - Location: Just west of Wilderness.
- Stuart mine
  - Quadrangle: Lahore
  - Location: N 4,234,870 E 242,930 (Zone 18)
- Vaucluse (Grimes, Grymes)(2 mines) mine
  - Quadrangle: Chancellorsville
  - Location: N 4,248,390 E 261,560 / N 4,248,220 E 261,430 / N 4,248,110 E 261,390 (Zone 18)
- Wilderness mine
  - Quadrangle: Chancellorsville
  - Location: N 4,246,430 E 261,240 (Zone 18)
- Woodman mine
  - Quadrangle: Mine Run
  - Location: Lower Orange County
- Woodville mine
  - Quadrangle: Chancellorsville
  - Location: N 4,246,140 E 260,630 (Zone 18)
- Young mine
  - Quadrangle: Lahore
  - Location: N 4,234,670 E 245,020 (Zone 18)

- Mines with insufficient data
  - Randolph mine

=== Mines in Patrick County ===
- Polebridge Creek mine
  - Quadrangle: Patrick Springs
  - Location: N 4,064,570 E 576,340 (Zone 17)

=== Mines in Prince William County ===
- Cabin Branch (Dumfries) mine
  - Quadrangle: Patrick Springs
  - Location: N 4,271,980 E 295,420 (Zone 18)
- Crawford (Neabsco Creek) mine
  - Quadrangle: Quantico
  - Location: N 4,277,360 E 299,620 (Zone 18)
- Greenwood Gold Mine
  - Quadrangle: Independent Hill
  - Location: N 4,278,360 E 288,260 (Zone 18)

=== Mines in Spotsylvania County ===
- Anderson's mine
  - Quadrangle: Belmont
  - Location: About 30 miles (48 km) southwest of Parker, probably on Robertson Run, 3 to 4 miles (4.8 to 6.4 km) west of the Old Shady Grove church.
- Beazley mine
  - Quadrangle: Belmont
  - Location: N 4,236,840 E 258,660 (Zone 18)
- Bell mine
  - Quadrangle: Salem Church
  - Location: N 4,246,140 E 274,320 (Zone 18)
- Brinton mine
  - Quadrangle: Chancellorsville
  - Location: N 4,248,350 E 269,930 (Zone 18)
- Faws Tract mine
  - Quadrangle: Chancellorsville
  - Location: About 14.0 miles (22.5 km) west of Fredericksburg, near the old Wilderness Tavern, southwest of the Greenwood mine.
- Furnace mine
  - Quadrangle: Chancellorsville
  - Location: N 4,240,960 E 267,950 (Zone 18)
- Gardiner mine
  - Quadrangle: Salem Church
  - Location: N 4,245,730 E 271,870 (Zone 18)
- Goodwyn (Goodwins, Pocahontas) mine
  - Quadrangle: Chancellorsville
  - Location: N 4,244,820 E 254,030 (Zone 18)
- Grindstone Hill mine
  - Quadrangle: Belmont
  - Location: N 4,230,790 E 257,780 (Zone 18)
- Higgins (Huggin's) mine
  - Quadrangle: Brokenburg
  - Location: On Upper Po River, near the Whitehall mine.
- Horde mine
  - Quadrangle: Salem Church
  - Location: Near the United States Ford at confluence of Rapidan and Rappahannock Rivers.
- Hunting Run mine
  - Quadrangle: Chancellorsville
  - Location: N 4,246,630 E 267,790 (Zone 18)
- Johnston's (Johnston) mine
  - Quadrangle: Belmont
  - Location: N 4,229,740 E 258,440 (Zone 18)
- Julian mine
  - Quadrangle: Salem Church
  - Location: Tract lies near southwest bank of the Rappahannock River.
- Knapp (New Dominion) mine
  - Quadrangle: Belmont
  - Location: N 4,224,810 E 254,260 (Zone 18)
- Marsden mine
  - Quadrangle: Chancellorsville

Location: N 4,240,150 E 262,150 (Zone 18)

- Mitchell (Old Dominion, Emily) mine
  - Quadrangle: Belmont
  - Location: N 4,228,700 E 256,340 (Zone 18)
- Mott mine
  - Quadrangle: Salem Church
  - Location: N 4,244,630 E 275,710 (Zone 18)
- New Grindstone mine
  - Quadrangle: Belmont
  - Location: N 4,231,210 E 256,780 (Zone 18)
- Powell's (Powells, Jerdones) mine
  - Quadrangle: Brokenburg
  - Location: N 4,232,270 E 259,440 (Zone 18)
- Prospect A
  - Quadrangle: Chancellorsville
  - Location: N 4,243,350 E 266,790 (Zone 18)
- Prospect B
  - Quadrangle: Belmont
  - Location: N 4,230,750 E 256,550 (Zone 18)
- Quaker mine
  - Quadrangle: Chancellorsville
  - Location: N 4,238,590 E 265,430 (Zone 18)
- Ramsey mine
  - Quadrangle: Salem Church
  - Location: N 4,246,850 E 274,860 (Zone 18)
- Randolph mine
  - Quadrangle: Brokenburg
  - Location: N 4,236,570 E 261,310 (Zone 18)
- Rawlings mine
  - Quadrangle: Belmont
  - Location: N 4,231,450 E 257,010 (Zone 18)
- Roney mine
  - Quadrangle: Belmont
  - Location: N 4,232,650 E 258,130 (Zone 18)
- Smith mine
  - Quadrangle: Salem Church
  - Location: N 4,245,370 E 273,670 (Zone 18)
- Starrs (Stajar's Stairs) mine
  - Quadrangle: Belmont
  - Location: N 4,225,110 E 254,060 (Zone 18)
- Trigg mine
  - Quadrangle: Chancellorsville
  - Location: Near Brockville (now Bockroad), According to Spotsylvania County Deed books, the old mine is located near Stephens Station on the south side of the Old Potomac, Piedmont and Fredericksburg Railway; a tract of approximately 158 acres (0.64 km^{2}) bounded by lands of Oscar Todd, George Rowe Welford and Alexander B. Hawkins.
- UNITED STATES (Welford) mine
  - Quadrangle: Salem Church
  - Location: N 4,248,480 E 270,940 (Zone 18)
- Valzinco (Halladay, Holloday) mine
  - Quadrangle: Belmont
  - Location: N 4,228,850 E 254,940 (Zone 18)
- Whitehall mine
  - Quadrangle: Brokenburg
  - Location: N 4,235,680 E 260,320 (Zone 18)
- Mines with insufficient data
  - Donnings mine
  - Gold Flat mine
  - Marshall mine
  - Pulliam (Pullman) mine
  - Quisenberry mine
  - Spotsylvania mine

=== Mines in Stafford County ===
- Eagle (Rappahannock, Smith, Morgan and Rappahannock) mine
  - Quadrangle: Salem Church
  - Location: N 4,249,440 E 272,560 (Zone 18)
- Elliot Farm mine
  - Quadrangle: Salem Church
  - Location: N 4,250,400 E 272,290 (Zone 18)
- Horse Pen (Horse Pin, Hospen, Rattlesnake) (2 mines) mine
  - Quadrangle: Salem Church
  - Location: N 4,248,860 E 274,170 / N 4,248,750 E 274,020 (Zone 18)
- Lee mine
  - Quadrangle: Salem Church
  - Location: N 4,249,290 E 275,130 (Zone 18)
- MacDonald mine
  - Quadrangle: Salem Church
  - Location: N 4,249,720 E 274,280 (Zone 18)
- Monroe mine
  - Quadrangle: Salem Church
  - Location: N 4,250,370 E 271,960 (Zone 18)
- New Hope (Newhope) mine
  - Quadrangle: Storck
  - Location: N 4,252,240 E 276,060 (Zone 18)
- Pris-King (2 shafts) mine
  - Quadrangle: Salem Church
  - Location: N 4,250,140 E 273,160 / N 4,250,000 E 273,090 (Zone 18)
- Prospect A
  - Quadrangle: Salem Church
  - Location: N 4,249,830 E 272,920 (Zone 18)
- Wiseman mine
  - Quadrangle: Salem Church
  - Location: N 4,247,920 E 273,240 (Zone 18)
- Mines with insufficient data
  - Brower mine
  - Fairview mine
  - Stafford mine

=== Mines in Warren County ===
- Gooney-Manor mine
  - Quadrangle: Front Royal
  - Location: N 4,307,220 E 739,340 (Zone 17)

=== Other mines, claims, and prospects ===
- Crawford placer prospect, in Dale City on Neabsco Creek about 500 yards west of I-95
