= Cabin Branch Pyrite Mine Historic District =

Historic district in Virginia, United States

- U.S. National Register of Historic Places
- U.S. Historic district
- Virginia Landmarks Register
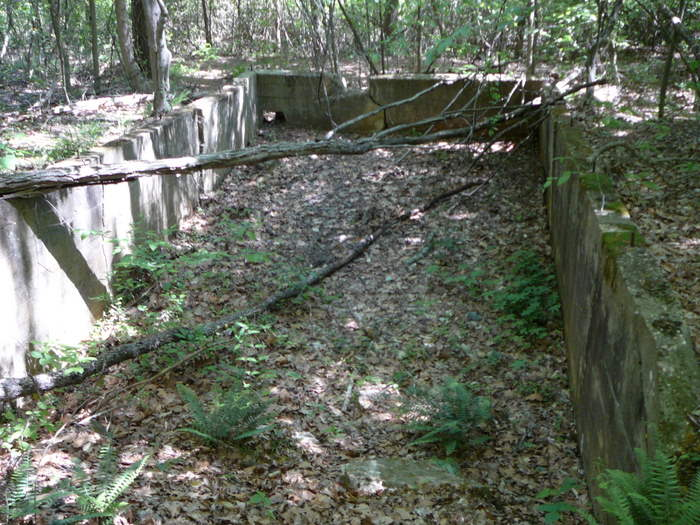
- Bin ruins in the Cabin Branch Pyrite Mine Historic District, May 2007

- Location within Northern Virginia Location within Virginia Location within the United States
- Location: Prince William Forest Park, Triangle, Virginia
- Coordinates: 38°34′36″N 77°21′02″W
- Area: 68 acres (28 ha)
- Built: 1889
- NRHP reference No.: 02001517
- VLR No.: 076-0289

Significant dates
- Added to NRHP: December 12, 2002
- Designated VLR: June 12, 2002

Cabin Branch Pyrite Mine Historic District is a national historic district located at Prince William Forest Park, Triangle, Prince William County, Virginia. It encompasses 4 contributing sites and 42 contributing structures associated with the Cabin Branch pyrite mine. The pyrite mine opened in 1889, and remained in operation until 1919 or 1920. The property includes a number of capped mine shafts, and the remains of a commissary building and an old mill; and mine structures, including crusher house, mill, mechanical and support buildings, numerous rail lines.

It was added to the National Register of Historic Places in 2002.
