= Recreational Demonstration Area =

The Recreational Demonstration Area program (also known as the Recreation Demonstration Area program) was a National Park Service program during the 1930s and early 1940s that built forty-six public parks in twenty-four states on 397,000 acres (1,606.6 km^{2}), chiefly near urban areas in the United States. The NPS used labor from a variety of Great Depression federal relief programs, chiefly the Civilian Conservation Corps and Works Progress Administration, to build recreational demonstration areas. By the end of World War II, the recreational demonstration areas had all either become National Park Service units or been given to their states for use as state parks.

The goals of the Recreation Demonstration Area program were typically threefold: 1) to develop land as a park; 2) to provide employment; and 3) to create new parks near urban areas. For the first goal, in some cases the land developed was purchased from sub-optimal farmers, providing some of the poorest farmers with relief. In other cases, state lands (in state forests or parks) were developed. In the second case, the CCC and WPA laborers received payment, and in the CCC, room and board. Finally, the residents of nearby urban areas benefited from new nearby recreation areas.

== List ==
The following is a list of the forty six former recreational demonstration areas.

| Name | State | Now | Current Name(s) | Remarks |
|---|---|---|---|---|
| Acadia Recreational Demonstration Area | Maine | Federal | Acadia National Park | |
| Alexander H. Stephens Recreational Demonstration Area | Georgia | State | A.H. Stephens State Historic Park | State park extension |
| Badlands Recreational Demonstration Area | South Dakota | Federal | Badlands National Park | |
| Beach Pond Recreational Demonstration Area | Rhode Island | State | Beach Pond State Park | |
| Bear Brook Recreational Demonstration Area | New Hampshire | State | Bear Brook State Park | |
| Blue Knob Recreational Demonstration Area | Pennsylvania | State | Blue Knob State Park | |
| Blue Ridge Recreational Demonstration Area | North Carolina, Virginia | Federal | Blue Ridge Parkway | |
| Bull Run Recreational Demonstration Area | Virginia | Federal | Manassas National Battlefield Park | |
| Camden Hills Recreational Demonstration Area | Maine | State | Camden Hills State Park | |
| Catoctin Recreational Demonstration Area | Maryland | Both | Cunningham Falls State Park, Catoctin Mountain Park, Camp David | near Baltimore and Washington D.C., part became a retreat for the U.S. President |
| Cheraw Recreational Demonstration Area | South Carolina | State | Cheraw State Park | |
| Chopawamsic Recreational Demonstration Area | Virginia | Federal | Prince William Forest Park | In the greater Washington D.C. area. Four camps are separately listed on the National Register of Historic Places: Goodwill Historic District, Chopawamsic RDA Camp 1; Mawavi Historic District, Chopawamsic RDA Camp 2; Orenda/SP-26 Historic District, Chopawamsic RDA Camp 3; Pleasant Historic District, Chopawamsic RDA Camp 4 |
| Crabtree Creek Recreational Demonstration Area | North Carolina | State | William B. Umstead State Park | |
| Cuivre River Recreational Demonstration Area | Missouri | State | Cuivre River State Park | |
| Custer Recreational Demonstration Area | South Dakota | State | Custer State Park | State park extension |
| Falls Creek Recreational Demonstration Area | Tennessee | State | Fall Creek Falls State Park | State park extension |
| French Creek Recreational Demonstration Area | Pennsylvania | Both | Hopewell Furnace National Historic Site, French Creek State Park | |
| Hard Labor Creek Recreational Demonstration Area | Georgia | State | Hard Labor Creek State Park | |
| Hickory Run Recreational Demonstration Area | Pennsylvania | State | Hickory Run State Park | |
| Kings Mountain Recreational Demonstration Area | South Carolina | Both | Kings Mountain National Military Park, Kings Mountain State Park | |
| Lake Guernsey Recreational Demonstration Area | Wyoming | State | Guernsey State Park | State park extension |
| Lake Murray Recreational Demonstration Area" | Oklahoma | State | Lake Murray State Park | |
| Lake of the Ozarks Recreational Demonstration Area". | Missouri | State | Lake of the Ozarks State Park | |
| Laurel Hill Recreational Demonstration Area | Pennsylvania | State | Laurel Hill State Park | |
| Mendocino Woodland Recreational Demonstration Area | California | State | Mendocino Woodlands State Park | National Historic Landmark |
| Montgomery Bell Recreational Demonstration Area | Tennessee | State | Montgomery Bell State Park | |
| Montserrat Recreational Demonstration Area | Missouri | State | Knob Noster State Park | |
| Oak Mountain Recreational Demonstration Area | Alabama | State | Oak Mountain State Park | |
| Otter Creek Recreational Demonstration Area | Kentucky | Local | Otter Creek Park | |
| Pere Marquette Recreational Demonstration Area | Illinois | State | Pere Marquette State Park | |
| Pine Mountain Recreational Demonstration Area | Georgia | State | Franklin Roosevelt State Park (western half) | Franklin D. Roosevelt visited the park often during its construction (his Little White House at Warm Springs is in the eastern half of the modern park). State park extension |
| Raccoon Creek Recreational Demonstration Area | Pennsylvania | State | Raccoon Creek State Park | |
| Shelby Forest Recreational Demonstration Area | Tennessee | State | Meeman-Shelby Forest State Park | |
| Shenandoah Recreational Demonstration Area | Virginia | Federal | Shenandoah National Park | |
| Silver Creek Recreational Demonstration Area | Oregon | State | Silver Falls State Park | |
| St. Croix Recreational Demonstration Area | Minnesota | State | St. Croix State Park | Now a National Historic Landmark |
| Swift Creek Recreational Demonstration Area | Virginia | State | Pocahontas State Park | |
| Roosevelt Recreational Demonstration Area | North Dakota | Federal | Theodore Roosevelt National Park | |
| Versailles Recreational Demonstration Area | Indiana | State | Versailles State Park | |
| Waterloo Recreational Demonstration Area | Michigan | State | Waterloo State Recreation Area | |
| Waysides, South Carolina Recreational Demonstration Area | South Carolina | | | |
| Waysides, Virginia Recreational Demonstration Area | Virginia | | | |
| White Sands Recreational Demonstration Area | New Mexico | Federal | White Sands National Park | |
| Winamac Recreational Demonstration Area | Indiana | State | Winamac Fish and Wildlife Area, Tippecanoe River State Park | |
| Yankee Springs Recreational Demonstration Area | Michigan | State | Yankee Springs Recreation Area | |

== History ==
There are five former recreational demonstration areas in Pennsylvania, which became part of one unit of the National Park Service, and five state parks in 1945 and 1946. There are five former recreational demonstration areas in Virginia, four of which are now part of the National Park Service. Two recreational demonstration areas were built in Missouri and are now state parks. There are three former recreational demonstration areas in Tennessee, all are now state parks.
