= Paternoster (surname) =

Paternoster is a surname. Notable people with the surname include:

- Angelo Paternoster (1919–2012), American football guard
- Fernando Paternoster (1903–1967), Argentine footballer and manager
- Henri Paternóster (1908–2007), Belgian fencer
- Henry Paternoster (1882–1956), Australian rules footballer
- Jim Paternoster (1875–1954), Australian rules footballer
- Letizia Paternoster (born 1999), Italian cyclist
- Marissa Paternoster (born 1986), American musician
- Matt Paternoster (1880–1962), Australian rules footballer
- Paola Paternoster (1935–2018), Italian retired athlete
- Raymond Paternoster (1952–2017), American criminologist
- Richard Paternoster (1802–1892), English civil servant
- Roger Paternoster (born 1934), Belgian field hockey player
- Ron Paternoster (1916–2002), Australian rules footballer
- Verusca Paternoster (born 1972), Italian softball player
- Vito Paternoster (21st century), Italian cellist
