= Pleasant Historic District, Chopawamsic RDA Camp 4 =

Historic district in Virginia, United States

- U.S. National Register of Historic Places
- U.S. Historic district
- Virginia Landmarks Register
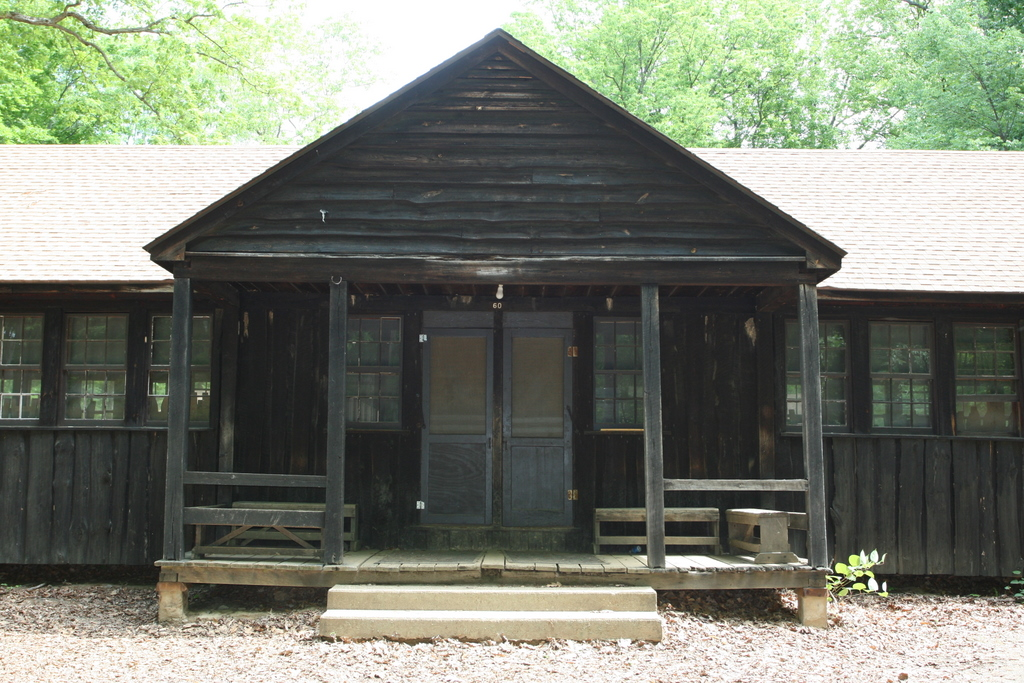

- Location within Northern Virginia Location within Virginia Location within the United States
- Nearest city: Triangle, Virginia
- Area: 132 acres (53 ha)
- Built: 1934
- Built by: CCC
- Architect: NPS
- Architectural style: NPS rustic architecture
- MPS: ECW Architecture at Prince William Forest Park 1933--1942 MPS
- NRHP reference No.: 89000459
- VLR No.: 076-0146

Significant dates
- Added to NRHP: June 12, 1989
- Designated VLR: September 20, 1988

The Pleasant Historic District, Chopawamsic RDA Camp 4 near Triangle, Virginia dates from 1934. It was listed on the National Register of Historic Places in 1989. It includes NPS rustic architecture and is within what is now Prince William Forest Park. The listing included 36 contributing buildings and three contributing structures on 132 acres (53 ha).
