= Independent Hill, Virginia =

Independent Hill
- Unincorporated town
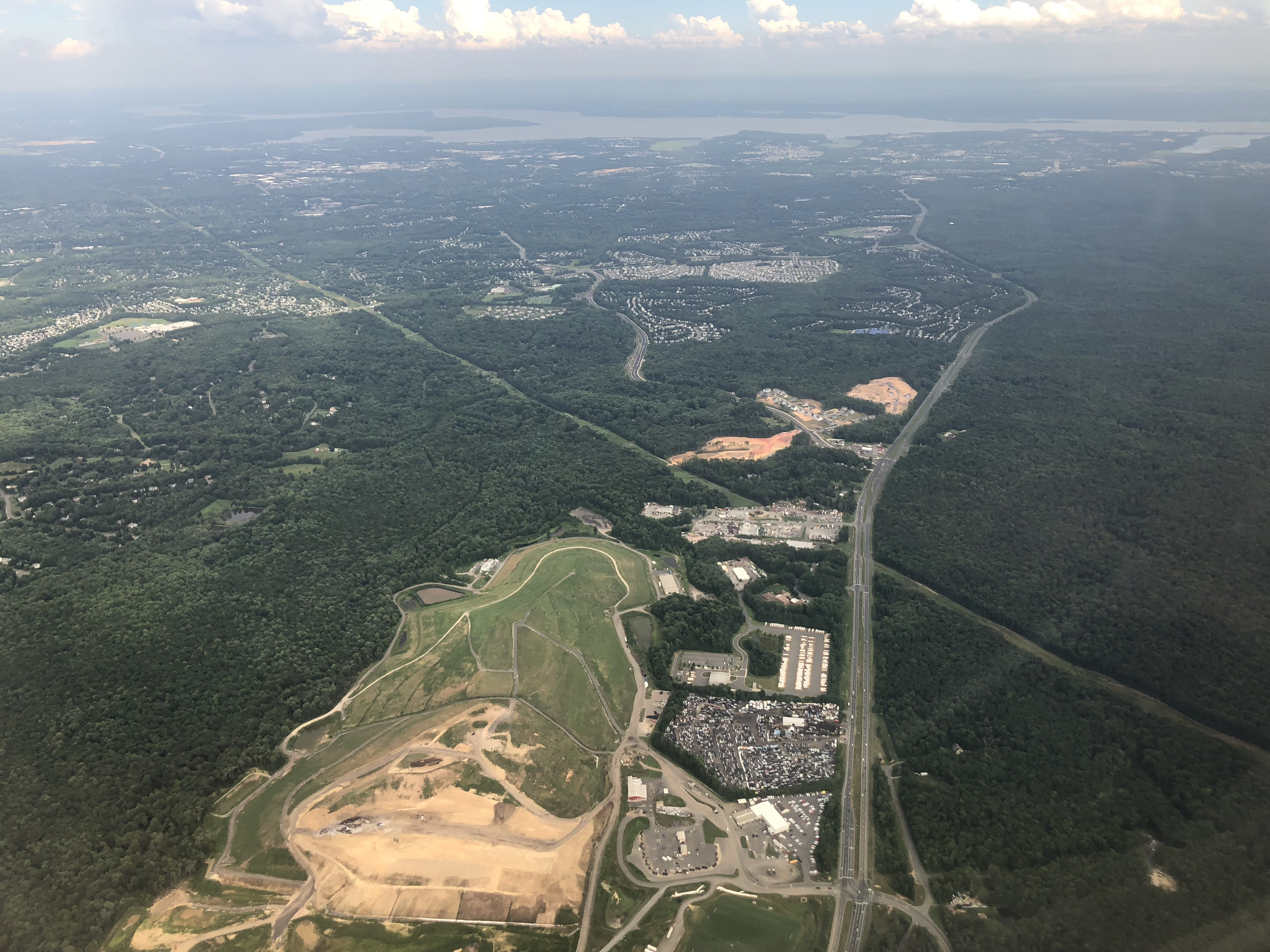

- Location in Prince William County and the state of Virginia.
- Coordinates: 38°38′9″N 77°26′16″W
- Country: United States
- State: Virginia
- County: Prince William

Population (2020)
  - Total: 10,165
- Time zone: UTC−5 (Eastern (EST))
  - Summer (DST): UTC−4 (EDT)
- ZIP codes: 20112
- Area codes: 571, 703
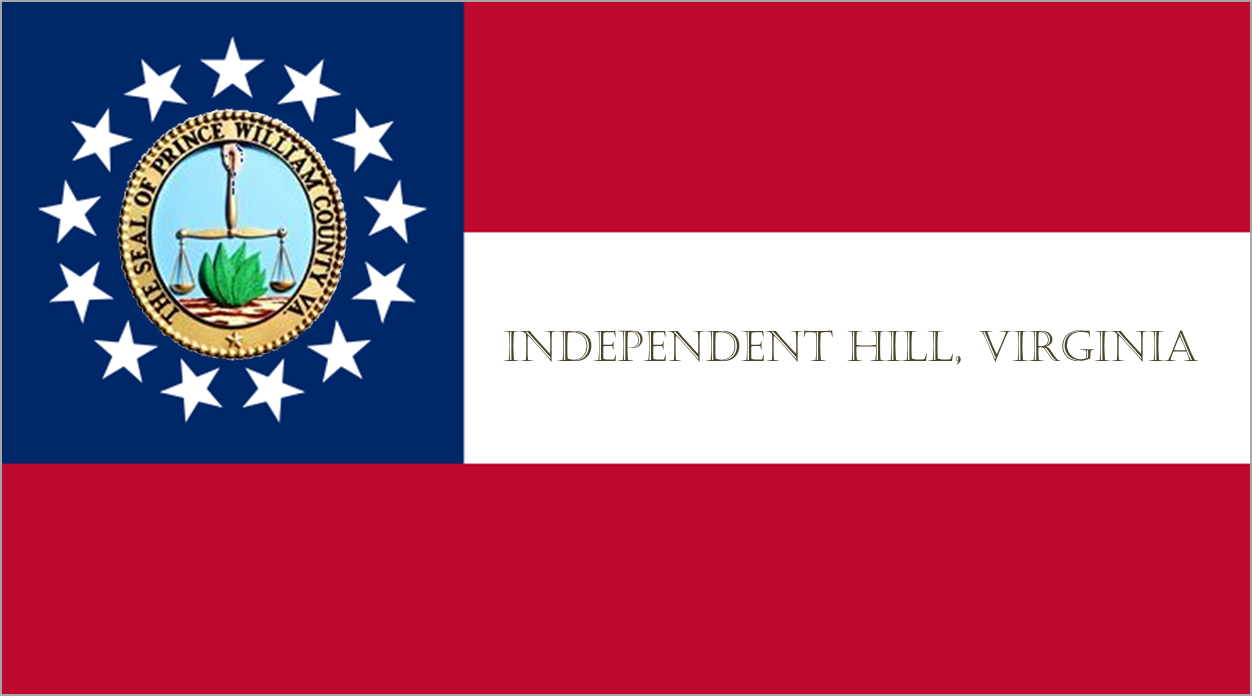
- Unofficial flag of Independent Hill, Virginia, based on the First National Flag of the Confederate States of America and the regimental colours of the Prince William Cavalry, raised at the nearby county courthouse in 1861.

Independent Hill is an unincorporated town in Prince William County, Virginia, United States. It is located along State Route 234 at the intersection with Joplin Road. There are only a few remaining businesses. In early 2006, a realignment of 234 bypassed the town, leaving it on a side road. The greater Independent Hill area is defined by the Census Bureau as a census-designated place (CDP), with a population of 10,165 as of 2020.

Independent Hill is also the home of the Prince William County School Board Complex. The administrative, support, and maintenance personnel of the school system report there.

The Greenwood Gold Mine operated nearby for a few years before closing in 1885.

== Demographics ==
Historical population
Census	Pop.	Note	%±
2010	7,419		—
2020	10,165		37.0%
U.S. Decennial Census; 2010 2020

Independent Hill was first listed as a census designated place in the 2010 U.S. census.

== Education ==
Independent Hill is home to Colgan High School.
