= Prince William Forest Park =

Protected forest in Virginia, U.S.

- IUCN category III (natural monument or feature)
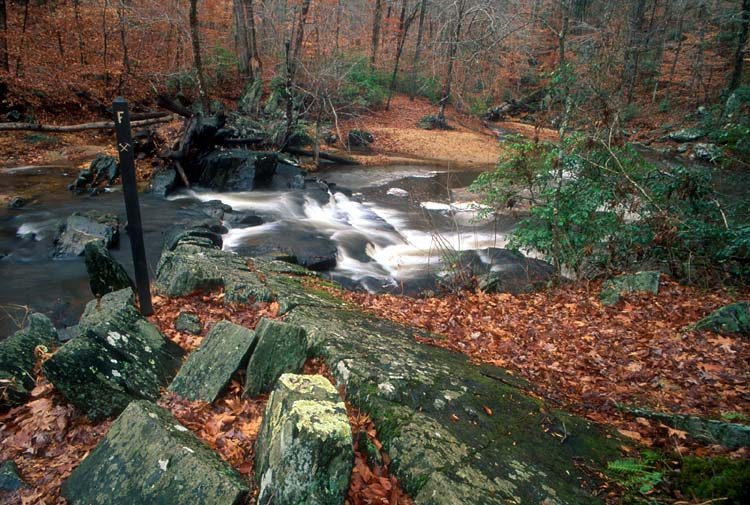
- Quantico Creek in Prince William Forest Park

- Location within Virginia Location within the United States
- Nearest city: Dumfries, Virginia
- Coordinates: 38°35′07″N 77°22′47″W
- Area: 16,084 acres (65.09 km^{2})
- Established: November 14, 1936
- Visitors: 339,015 (in 2025)
- Governing body: National Park Service
- Website: Prince William Forest Park

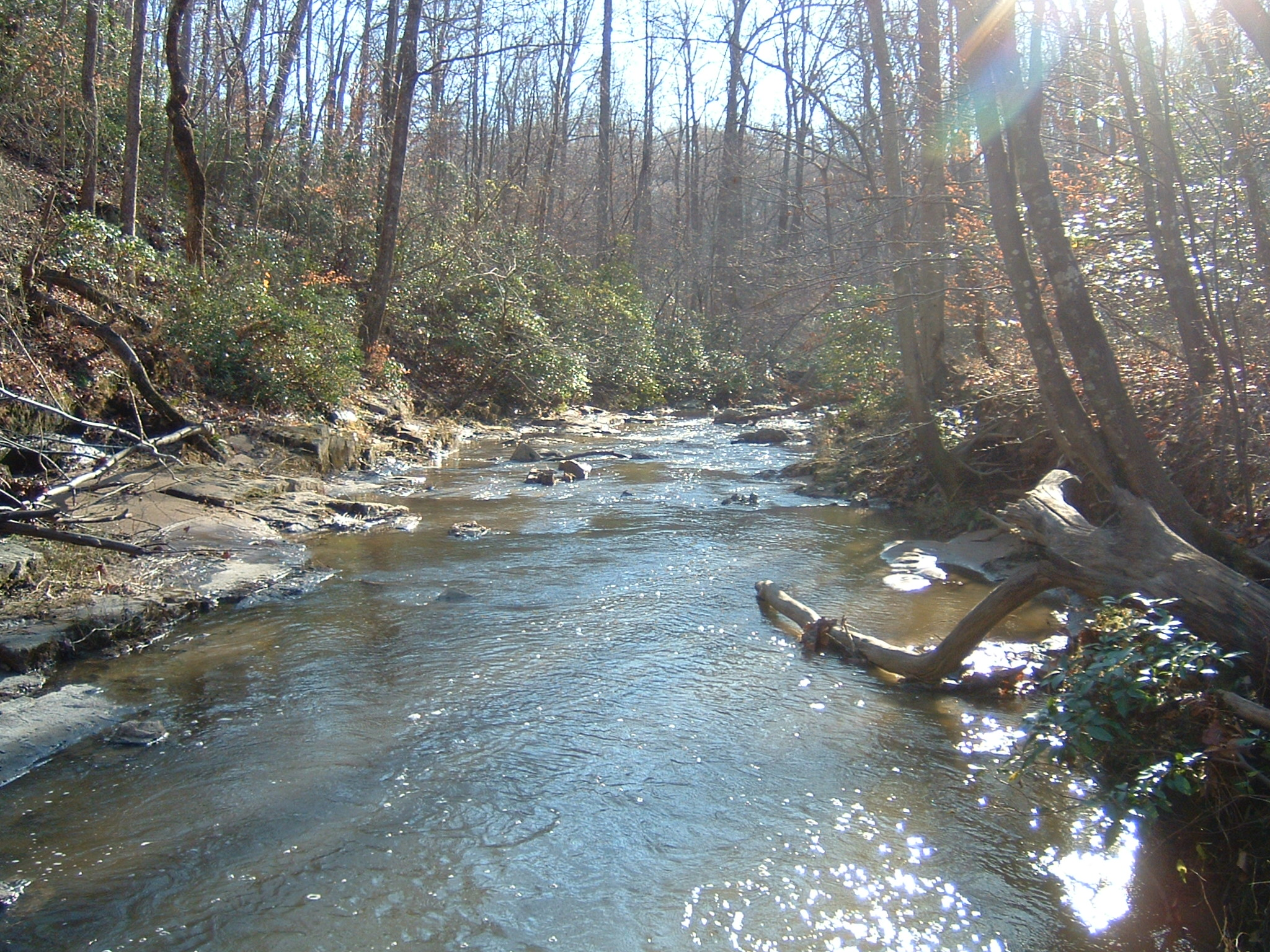
The North Fork of Quantico Creek, from the North Valley trail

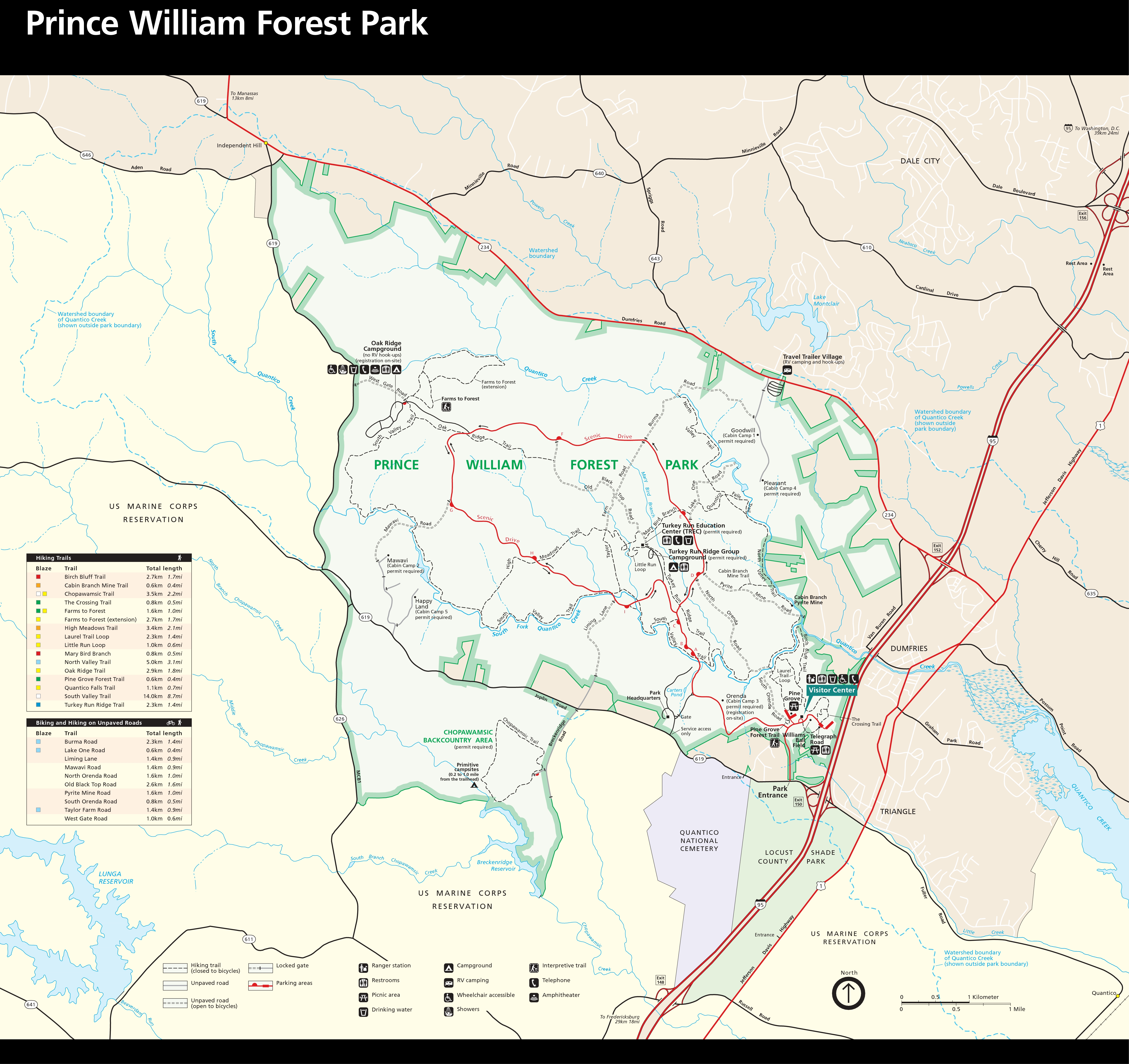
Map of Prince William Forest Park

Prince William Forest Park is a National Park Service (NPS) site in the U.S. state of Virginia within Prince William County (and very partially Stafford County), located adjacent to the Marine Corps Base Quantico near the town of Dumfries. Established as Chopawamsic Recreational Demonstration Area in 1936, the park is the largest protected natural area in the Washington, D.C. metropolitan region at over 13,000 acres (5,300 ha).

The park serves as the largest example of Eastern Piedmont forest in the National Park System. The park also protects the Quantico Creek watershed. It is a sanctuary for numerous native plant and animal species.

The park was developed by Works Progress Administration workers after the Great Depression. Landscaping and structures were designed by National Park Service architects. Four camp areas are listed individually on the National Register of Historic Places:

- Goodwill Historic District, Chopawamsic RDA Camp 1
- Mawavi Historic District, Chopawamsic RDA Camp 2
- Orenda/SP-26 Historic District, Chopawamsic RDA Camp 3
- Pleasant Historic District, Chopawamsic RDA Camp 4

The park also includes the Cabin Branch Pyrite Mine Historic District, listed on the National Register of Historic Places in 2002. The park itself was designed as the Prince William Forest Park Historic District in 2012.

== History ==
The land on which Prince William Forest Park now resides was once used by Native Americans of the Archaic period. The Native Americans would use the area for hunting, gathering, and camping. Many artifacts from the archaic people have been found throughout the park.

The park was erected where once the town of Batestown stood. It was an enclave for freed slaves named for Mary Bates, the matriarch of the community.

Between 1933 and 1937, the Federal Government began implementing a Resettlement Administration program to form Chopawamsic Recreational Demonstration Area, where rural farmers were supposed to relocate for more fertile land. The RA bought 79 pieces of property in both Hickory Ridge and Batestown and condemned another 48, to form a new recreation area. However, the RA often made no effort to actually resettle the displaced residents.

The area residents resisted the relocation efforts, sometimes retreating into the park boundaries to escape detection. This continued until the beginning of World War II, where the park was taken over by the Office of Strategic Services as a spy training ground, since a camp was needed within driving distance of the capital that could focus on special operations. Trainees practiced dismantling booby traps, performing message drops, psychological warfare, shortwave radio, and basic and advanced ciphers.

The park was surrounded by barbed wire and fences, and patrolled by dogs and armed guards. All remaining forty-four holdouts were evicted, some carried away screaming.

At the end of the war, the displaced residents hoped their land would be restored, but to date these families have received no compensation. Instead, the property was turned over to the National Park Service and renamed Prince William Forest Park.

== Recreational opportunities ==
A variety of recreational opportunities are available, which include:

- Wildlife viewing
- 37 miles (60 km) of hiking trails. Most of these trails either go to a historical/cultural destination such as Pyrite Mine or follow Quantico Creek with views of its small waterfalls.
- 21 miles (34 km) of bicycle accessible roads and trails.
- Several tent camping options, including family, group and backcountry camping are available as well as rustic cabin camping, and a full-service, concessionaire-operated RV campground, are available.

== Cultural resources ==
The park’s cultural resources are also varied. They include:

- The remnants of Joplin, Hickory Ridge, and Batestown, three small communities evicted for the park’s establishment
- The reclaimed remnants of the Cabin Branch Pyrite Mine along Quantico Creek
- The reclaimed remnants of the Greenwood gold mine
- Products of the Civilian Conservation Corps (CCC), which built the facilities, roads and lakes from 1936 to 1942.
- The U.S. Army’s Office of Strategic Services (OSS) which used the land exclusively for training spies and radio operators between 1942 and 1945

== Wildlife ==
Prince William Forest Park is most notably home to mammalian species such as white-tailed deer, black bear, beaver, and coyote. Deer in particular can be seen almost anywhere in the park. A variety of bird species, such as the hooded warbler, the wood thrush, and the red-shouldered hawk, can also be found. Reptiles such as eastern black rat snakes have been seen in and around logs and brush areas, and eastern box turtles can often be found, especially after a light rain. There are a number of amphibians that inhabit the park, such as the American toad, green frog, and Cope's gray tree frog, as well as salamanders such as the marbled salamander and the eastern red-backed salamander. Various skinks can be seen around sunny areas of the trails as well.

== See also ==
- Breckenridge Reservoir
- List of parks in the Baltimore–Washington metropolitan area
