= Triangle, Virginia =

- Census-designated place (CDP)
- Location of Triangle in Prince William County and the state of Virginia
- Coordinates: 38°33′5″N 77°19′33″W
- Country: United States
- State: Virginia
- County: Prince William

Area
  - Total: 3.0 sq mi (7.7 km^{2})
  - Land: 2.8 sq mi (7.3 km^{2})
  - Water: 0.19 sq mi (0.5 km^{2})
- Elevation: 98 ft (30 m)

Population (2020)
  - Total: 9,589
  - Density: 3,400/sq mi (1,300/km^{2})
- Time zone: UTC−5 (Eastern (EST))
  - Summer (DST): UTC−4 (EDT)
- ZIP Code: 22172
- Area codes: 571, 703
- FIPS code: 51-79360
- GNIS feature ID: 1500234

Triangle is a census-designated place (CDP) in southeastern Prince William County, Virginia, United States. The population was 9,589 at the 2020 census. It is bounded to the south by the Marine Corps Base Quantico, which surrounds the town of Quantico. Part of the National Capital Region, it is approximately 32 miles southwest of Washington, D.C.

== Geography ==
According to the U.S. Census Bureau, Triangle has a total area of 7.7 square miles (3.0 km^{2}), of which 7.3 square miles (2.8 km^{2}) is land and 0.5 square miles (0.2 km^{2}) is water. It is bounded to the north and west by Dumfries, to the west by Prince William Forest Park, and to the east by the Potomac River. The National Museum of the Marine Corps is located here.

== Demographics ==
Historical population
Census	Pop.	Note	%±
1960	2,948		—
1970	3,021		2.5%
1980	4,770		57.9%
1990	4,740		−0.6%
2000	5,500		16.0%
2010	8,188		48.9%
2020	9,589		17.1%
U.S. Decennial Census; 1950 1960 1970; 1980 1990 2000; 2010

In the 1950 United States census, Triangle was combined with Dumfries, Virginia to form Dumfries-Triangle (pop 1,585). However, the two communities were separated again by the time of the 1960 U.S. census. It was listed as a census designated place in the 1980 U.S. census.

=== Racial and ethnic composition ===
Triangle CDP, Virginia – Racial and ethnic composition Note: the US Census treats Hispanic/Latino as an ethnic category. This table excludes Latinos from the racial categories and assigns them to a separate category. Hispanics/Latinos may be of any race.
Race / Ethnicity (NH = Non-Hispanic)	Pop 2000	Pop 2010	Pop 2020	% 2000	% 2010	% 2020
White alone (NH)	3,195	2,836	2,218	58.09%	34.64%	23.13%
Black or African American alone (NH)	1,533	2,962	3,800	27.87%	36.17%	39.63%
Native American or Alaska Native alone (NH)	22	18	21	0.40%	0.22%	0.22%
Asian alone (NH)	158	438	632	2.87%	5.35%	6.59%
Native Hawaiian or Pacific Islander alone (NH)	6	9	24	0.11%	0.11%	0.25%
Other race alone (NH)	14	20	109	0.25%	0.24%	1.14%
Mixed race or Multiracial (NH)	164	397	516	2.98%	4.85%	5.38%
Hispanic or Latino (any race)	408	1,508	2,269	7.42%	18.42%	23.66%
Total	5,500	8,188	9,589	100.00%	100.00%	100.00%

=== 2010 census ===
As of the 2010 census, there were 5,500 people, 2,196 households, and 1,341 families living in the CDP. The population density was 2,088.5 inhabitants per square mile (806.4/km^{2}). There were 2,318 housing units at an average density of 880.2 per square mile (339.8/km^{2}). The racial makeup of the CDP was 61.07% White, 28.33% African American, 0.49% Native American, 2.87% Asian, 0.11% Pacific Islander, 3.58% from other races, and 3.55% from two or more races. Hispanic or Latino of any race were 7.42% of the population.

There were 2,196 households, out of which 33.9% had children under the age of 18 living with them, 40.4% were married couples living together, 15.3% had a female householder with no husband present, and 38.9% were non-families. 29.7% of all households were made up of individuals, and 3.6% had someone living alone who was 65 years of age or older. The average household size was 2.50 and the average family size was 3.13.

In the CDP, the population was spread out, with 27.8% under the age of 18, 13.2% from 18 to 24, 34.4% from 25 to 44, 18.4% from 45 to 64, and 6.2% who were 65 years of age or older. The median age was 30 years. For every 100 females, there were 102.2 males. For every 100 females age 18 and over, there were 101.1 males.

The median income for a household in the CDP was $38,844, and the median income for a family was $43,811. Males had a median income of $32,017 versus $27,722 for females. The per capita income for the CDP was $18,982. About 7.1% of families and 8.8% of the population were below the poverty line, including 11.4% of those under age 18 and 4.9% of those age 65 or over.

== Government ==
Triangle is part of Virginia's 31st House of Delegates district; as of 10 January 2018, residents are represented by Elizabeth Guzmán in the Virginia House of Delegates.
