= Virginia's 10th congressional district =

U.S. House district for Virginia

Coordinates: 39°04′33″N 77°51′24″W

- Interactive map of district boundaries since 2023
- Representative: Suhas Subramanyam; D–Brambleton
- Distribution: 85.53% urban; 14.47% rural
- Population (2025): 828,985
- Median household income: $170,138
- Ethnicity: 52% White; 18% Hispanic; 16% Asian; 8% Black; 5% Two or more races; 1% other
- Cook PVI: D+6

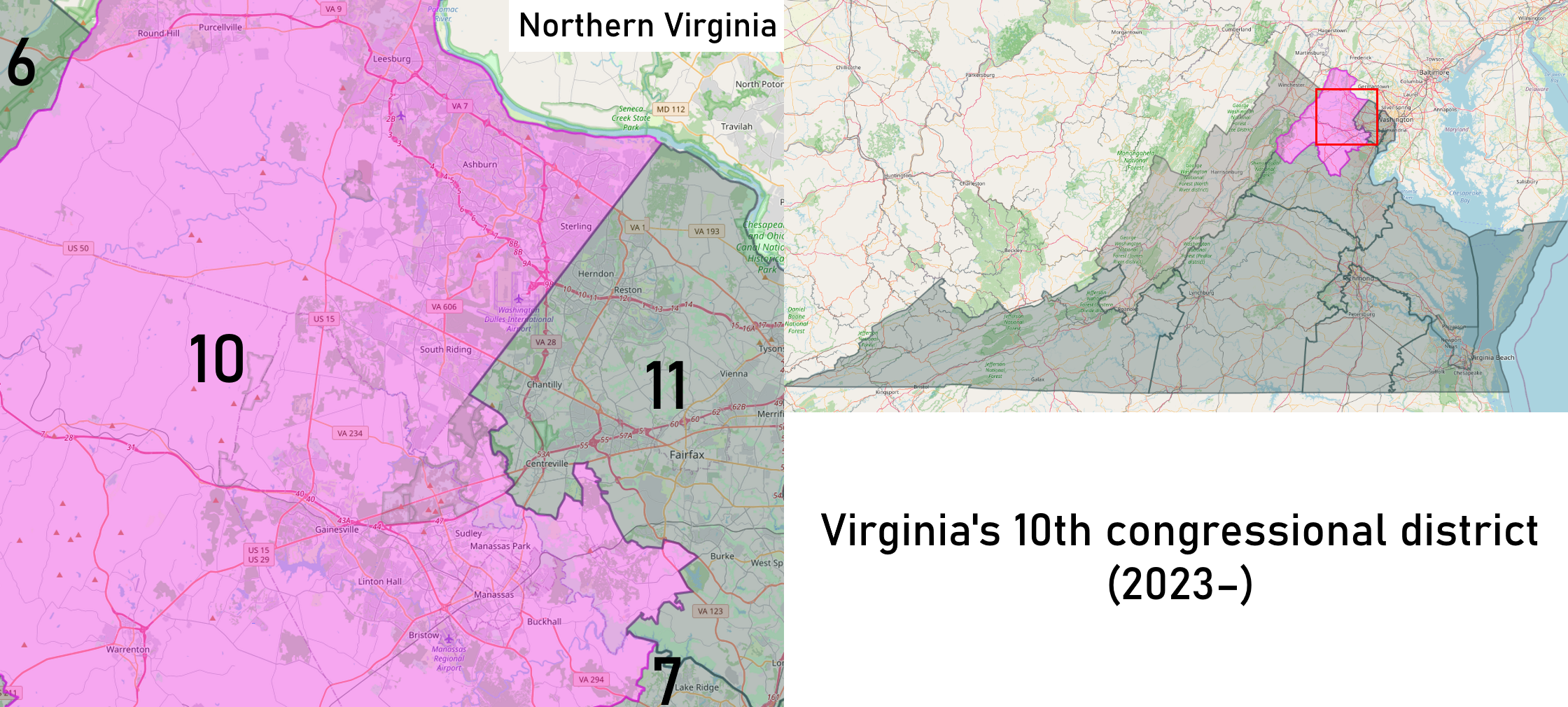
Virginia's 10th congressional district from January 3, 2023

Virginia's 10th congressional district is a U.S. congressional district in the Commonwealth of Virginia. Situated in the suburbs and exurbs of Northern Virginia, the district includes the entireties of Loudoun, Fauquier, and Rappahannock counties, along with portions of Fairfax and Prince William counties. The district also includes the cities of Manassas and Manassas Park. It has been represented by Democrat Suhas Subramanyam since 2025, who succeeded retiring Democratic incumbent Jennifer Wexton.

== Geography ==
The district includes all of Rappahannock County, Fauquier County, and Loudoun County, parts of Fairfax County and Prince William County, as well as the independent cities of Manassas and Manassas Park. The district closely matches Virginia's voting patterns in statewide races.

== History ==
Beginning when it was re-created in 1952, the 10th district was in Republican hands for 60 of 66 years, including long stints in office by Joel Broyhill (1953–74) and Frank Wolf (1981–2014). Barbara Comstock, a former aide to Wolf, succeeded him after the 2014 election. Jennifer Wexton defeated Comstock in the 2018 midterms, becoming only the second Democrat to win the district. Subramanyam ran in 2024 after Wexton did not seek re-election.

The modern 10th congressional district was formed in 1952. For the next two decades, it consisted of Arlington, Alexandria, and most of Fairfax County. As a result of redistricting following the 1970 census, it lost Alexandria and was pushed westward to take in Loudoun County. Virginia's 10th congressional district used to be a Republican stronghold, having once voted by double-digit margins for Republican candidates. In 2000, ten-term incumbent Republican Congressman Frank Wolf won over 80% of the vote and did not face a Democratic opponent. Two years later, Wolf defeated his Democratic challenger John Stevens by 43 points. In 2004, President George W. Bush won the district by 11 points. In recent years, the district has become much friendlier to Democrats due to population growth in the Washington, D.C. suburbs. In 2012, Mitt Romney narrowly carried the district by a point, while in 2016, Hillary Clinton won the district by 10 points.

In 2017, Democrats scored major gains in the state legislative elections, leaving Comstock as the only elected Republican above the county level in much of the district. Ralph Northam also easily carried the district in the gubernatorial race. This proved to be a precursor to Comstock's defeat by Wexton a year later. As of 2022, VA-10 is the third-wealthiest congressional district in the country, with a median household income of $140,889.

== Demographics ==
According to Larry Sabato's Crystal Ball, as of 2016, the district had many "wealthy and highly-educated voters". As of 2018, whites represented about 61% of the population, and immigrants (largely Hispanic and Asian) represented over 20%. Just over half of adults held at least a four-year college degree.

As of 2018, the 10th district had 35,500 federal workers. By comparison, the 1st district had 46,900; the 11th had 51,900; and the 8th had 81,100. As of 2018, the eastern part of the district was home to Dulles Airport and technology, telecom and aerospace companies including Verizon Business Global LLC and Aeronautical Systems Inc.

== Recent election results from statewide races ==
Year	Office	Results
2008	President	Obama 51% - 48%
2008	Senate	Warner 60% - 39%
2009	Governor	McDonnell 64% - 36%
2009	Lt. Governor	Bolling 61% - 39%
2009	Attorney General	Cuccinelli 61% - 38%
2012	President	Romney 50% - 49%
2012	Senate	Kaine 50.1% - 49.7%
2013	Governor	Cuccinelli 49% - 45%
2013	Lt. Governor	Northam 50% - 49%
2013	Attorney General	Obenshain 51% - 49%
2014	Senate	Gillespie 53% - 45%
2016	President	Clinton 51% - 43%
2017	Governor	Northam 54% - 44%
2017	Lt. Governor	Fairfax 53% - 47%
2017	Attorney General	Herring 54% - 46%
2018	Senate	Kaine 59% - 39%
2020	President	Biden 58% - 40%
2020	Senate	Warner 59% - 41%
2021	Governor	McAuliffe 51% - 49%
2021	Lt. Governor	Ayala 51% - 49%
2021	Attorney General	Herring 52% - 48%
2024	President	Harris 53% - 44%
2024	Senate	Kaine 55% - 45%
2025	Governor	Spanberger 60% - 40%
2025	Lt. Governor	Hashmi 58% - 42%
2025	Attorney General	Jones 55% - 44%

== Composition ==
For the 118th and successive Congresses (based on redistricting following the 2020 census), the district contains all or portions of the following counties and communities:

Fairfax County (4)

Braddock (part; also 11th), Bull Run, Clifton, Fairfax Station (part; also 11th), Union Mill (part; also 11th)

Fauquier County (13)

All 13 communities

Loudoun County (30)

All 30 communities

Prince William County (13)

Buckhall, Bull Run, Bull Run Mountain Estates, County Center (part; also 7th), Gainesville, Haymarket, Independent Hill (part; also 7th), Innovation, Linton Hall, Loch Lomond, Nokesville, Sudley, Yorkshire

Rappahannock County (4)

All 4 communities

Independent cities (2)

Manassas, Manassas Park

== Recent election results ==
=== 1970s ===
1970 Virginia's 10th congressional district election
Party	Candidate	Votes	%
Republican	Joel T. Broyhill (incumbent)	67,468	54.53
Democratic	Harold O. Miller	56,255	45.47
Total votes		123,723	100.00
Republican hold			

1972 Virginia's 10th congressional district election
Party	Candidate	Votes	%
Republican	Joel T. Broyhill (incumbent)	101,138	56.26
Democratic	Harold O. Miller	78,638	43.74
Write-ins		2	<0.01
Total votes		179,778	100.00
Republican hold			

1974 Virginia's 10th congressional district election
Party	Candidate	Votes	%
Democratic	Joseph L. Fisher	67,184	53.62
Republican	Joel T. Broyhill (incumbent)	56,649	45.21
Independent	Francis J. Speh	1,465	1.17
Write-ins		6	<0.01
Total votes		125,304	100.00
Democratic gain from Republican			

1976 Virginia's 10th congressional district election
Party	Candidate	Votes	%
Democratic	Joseph L. Fisher (incumbent)	103,689	54.72
Republican	Vincent F. Callahan Jr.	73,616	38.85
Independent	E. Stanley Rittenhouse	12,124	6.40
Write-ins		60	0.03
Total votes		189,489	100.00
Democratic hold			

1978 Virginia's 10th congressional district election
Party	Candidate	Votes	%
Democratic	Joseph L. Fisher (incumbent)	70,892	53.35
Republican	Frank Wolf	61,981	46.64
Write-ins		9	0.01
Total votes		132,882	100.00
Democratic hold			

=== 1980s ===
1980 Virginia's 10th congressional district election
Party	Candidate	Votes	%
Republican	Frank Wolf	110,840	51.14
Democratic	Joseph L. Fisher (incumbent)	105,883	48.85
Write-ins		21	0.01
Total votes		216,744	100.00
Republican gain from Democratic			

1982 Virginia's 10th congressional district election
Party	Candidate	Votes	%
Republican	Frank Wolf (incumbent)	86,506	52.74
Democratic	Ira M. Lechner	75,361	45.94
Independent	Scott R. Bowden	2,162	1.32
Write-ins		6	<0.01
Total votes		164,035	100.00
Republican hold			

1984 Virginia's 10th congressional district election
Party	Candidate	Votes	%
Republican	Frank Wolf (incumbent)	158,528	62.50
Democratic	John P. Flannery II	95,074	37.49
Write-ins		23	<0.01
Total votes		253,625	100.00
Republican hold			

1986 Virginia's 10th congressional district election
Party	Candidate	Votes	%
Republican	Frank Wolf (incumbent)	95,724	60.20
Democratic	John G. Milliken	63,292	39.80
Write-ins		7	<0.01
Total votes		159,023	100.00
Republican hold			

1988 Virginia's 10th congressional district election
Party	Candidate	Votes	%
Republican	Frank Wolf (incumbent)	188,550	68.09
Democratic	Bob L. Weinberg	88,284	31.88
Write-ins		74	0.03
Total votes		276,908	100.00
Republican hold			

=== 1990s ===
1990 Virginia's 10th congressional district election
Party	Candidate	Votes	%
Republican	Frank Wolf (incumbent)	103,761	61.46
Democratic	N. MacKenzie Canter III	57,249	33.91
Independent	Barbara S. Minnich	5,273	3.12
Independent	Lyndon LaRouche	2,293	1.36
Write-ins		249	0.15
Total votes		168,825	100.00
Republican hold			

1992 Virginia's 10th congressional district election
Party	Candidate	Votes	%
Republican	Frank Wolf (incumbent)	144,471	63.59
Democratic	Raymond E. Vickery Jr.	75,775	33.35
Independent	Alan R. Ogden	6,874	3.03
Write-ins		71	0.03
Total votes		227,191	100.00
Republican hold			

1994 Virginia's 10th congressional district election
Party	Candidate	Votes	%
Republican	Frank Wolf (incumbent)	153,311	87.34
Independent	Alan R. Ogden	13,687	7.80
Independent	Robert L. Rilee	8,267	4.71
Write-ins		266	0.15
Total votes		175,531	100.00
Republican hold			

1996 Virginia's 10th congressional district election
Party	Candidate	Votes	%
Republican	Frank Wolf (incumbent)	169,266	72.02
Democratic	Bob L. Weinberg	59,145	25.17
Independent	Gary A. Reams	6,500	2.77
Write-ins		102	0.04
Total votes		235,013	100.00
Republican hold			

1998 Virginia's 10th congressional district election
Party	Candidate	Votes	%
Republican	Frank Wolf (incumbent)	103,648	71.60
Democratic	Cornell W. Brooks	36,476	25.20
Independent	Robert A. Buchanan	4,506	3.11
Write-ins		125	0.09
Total votes		144,755	100.00
Republican hold			

=== 2000s ===
2000 Virginia's 10th congressional district election
Party	Candidate	Votes	%
Republican	Frank Wolf (incumbent)	238,817	84.20
Independent	Brian M. Brown	28,107	9.91
Independent	Marc A. Rossi	16,031	5.65
Write-ins		682	0.24
Total votes		283,637	100.00
Republican hold			

2002 Virginia's 10th congressional district election
Party	Candidate	Votes	%
Republican	Frank Wolf (incumbent)	115,917	71.72
Democratic	John B. Stevens Jr.	45,464	28.13
Write-ins		234	0.14
Total votes		161,615	100.00
Republican hold			

2004 Virginia's 10th congressional district election
Party	Candidate	Votes	%
Republican	Frank Wolf (incumbent)	205,982	63.77
Democratic	James R. Socas	116,654	36.11
Write-ins		375	0.12
Total votes		323,011	100.00
Republican hold			

2006 Virginia's 10th congressional district election
Party	Candidate	Votes	%
Republican	Frank Wolf (incumbent)	138,213	57.32
Democratic	Judy Feder	98,769	40.96
Libertarian	Wilbur N. Wood III	2,107	0.87
Independent	Neeraj C. Nigam	1,851	0.77
Write-ins		194	0.08
Total votes		241,134	100.00
Republican hold			

2008 Virginia's 10th congressional district election
Party	Candidate	Votes	%
Republican	Frank Wolf (incumbent)	223,140	58.80
Democratic	Judy Feder	147,357	38.83
Independent	Neeraj C. Nigam	8,457	2.23
Write-ins		526	0.14
Total votes		379,480	100.00
Republican hold			

=== 2010s ===
2010 Virginia's 10th congressional district election
Party	Candidate	Votes	%
Republican	Frank Wolf (incumbent)	131,116	62.87
Democratic	Jeff Barnett	72,604	34.81
Libertarian	Bill Redpath	4,607	2.21
Write-ins		229	0.11
Total votes		208,556	100.00
Republican hold			

2012 Virginia's 10th Congressional District election
Party	Candidate	Votes	%
Republican	Frank Wolf (incumbent)	214,038	58.41
Democratic	Kristin Cabral	142,024	38.76
Independent	Kevin Chisholm	9,855	2.69
Write-in		527	0.14
Total votes		366,444	100
Republican hold			

2014 Virginia's 10th Congressional District election
Party	Candidate	Votes	%
Republican	Barbara Comstock	125,914	56.49%
Democratic	John Foust	89,957	40.36%
Libertarian	Bill Redpath	3,393	1.52%
Independent	Brad Eickholt	2,442	1.10%
Independent Greens	Dianne Blais	946	0.42%
Write-in		258	0.12%
Total votes		222,910	100%
Republican hold			

2016 Virginia's 10th Congressional District election
Party	Candidate	Votes	%	±%
Republican	Barbara Comstock (incumbent)	210,791	52.69%	−3.8%
Democratic	LuAnn Bennett	187,712	46.92%	+6.56%
Write-in		1,580	0.39%	+0.27%
Total votes		400,083	100%	+79.48%
Republican hold				

2018 Virginia's 10th Congressional District election
Party	Candidate	Votes	%	±%
Democratic	Jennifer Wexton	206,356	56.1%	+9.2%
Republican	Barbara Comstock (incumbent)	160,841	43.7%	−9.0%
Write-in		598	0.2%	−0.2%
Total votes		367,795	100%	-8.4%
Democratic gain from Republican				

=== 2020s ===
2020 Virginia's 10th Congressional District election
Party	Candidate	Votes	%	±%
Democratic	Jennifer Wexton (incumbent)	268,734	56.5%	+0.4%
Republican	Aliscia Andrews	206,253	43.4%	−0.3%
Write-in		559	0.1%	−0.1%
Total votes		475,546		
Democratic hold				

2022 Virginia's 10th Congressional District election
Party	Candidate	Votes	%	±%
Democratic	Jennifer Wexton (incumbent)	157,405	53.15%	−3.35%
Republican	Hung Cao	138,163	46.65%	+3.25%
Write-in		577	0.19%	+.09%
Total votes		296,145		
Democratic hold				

2024 Virginia's 10th congressional district election
Party	Candidate	Votes	%
Democratic	Suhas Subramanyam	215,131	52.1
Republican	Mike Clancy	196,343	47.5
Write-in		1,538	0.4
Total votes		413,012	100.0
Democratic hold			

== List of members representing the district ==
Representative	Party	Years	Cong ress	Electoral history
District established March 4, 1789
Samuel Griffin (Williamsburg)	Pro-Administration	March 4, 1789 – March 3, 1791	1st 2nd	Elected in 1789. Re-elected in 1790. Redistricted to the 13th district.
Samuel Griffin (Williamsburg)	Anti-Administration	March 4, 1791 – March 3, 1793	1st 2nd	Elected in 1789. Re-elected in 1790. Redistricted to the 13th district.
Carter B. Harrison (Maycox)	Anti-Administration	March 4, 1793 – March 3, 1795	3rd 4th 5th	Elected in 1793. Re-elected in 1795. Re-elected in 1797. Retired.
Carter B. Harrison (Maycox)	Democratic-Republican	March 4, 1795 – March 3, 1799	3rd 4th 5th	Elected in 1793. Re-elected in 1795. Re-elected in 1797. Retired.
Edwin Gray	Democratic-Republican	March 4, 1799 – March 3, 1803	6th 7th	Elected in 1799. Re-elected in 1801. Redistricted to the 19th district.
John Dawson	Democratic-Republican	March 4, 1803 – March 3, 1813	8th 9th 10th 11th 12th	Redistricted from the 15th district and re-elected in 1803. Re-elected in 1805. Re-elected in 1807. Re-elected in 1809. Re-elected in 1811. Redistricted to the 11th district.
Aylett Hawes (Woodville)	Democratic-Republican	March 4, 1813 – March 3, 1817	13th 14th	Redistricted from the 9th district and re-elected in 1813. Re-elected in 1815. Retired.
George F. Strother (Culpeper)	Democratic-Republican	March 4, 1817 – February 10, 1820	15th 16th	Elected in 1817. Re-elected in 1819. Resigned.
Vacant		February 11, 1820 – November 12, 1820	16th	
Thomas L. Moore (Warrenton)	Democratic-Republican	November 13, 1820 – March 3, 1823	16th 17th	Elected to finish Strother's term in August 1820 and seated November 13, 1820. Re-elected in 1821. Retired.
William C. Rives (Milton)	Democratic-Republican	March 4, 1823 – March 3, 1825	18th 19th 20th 21st	Elected in 1823. Re-elected in 1825. Re-elected in 1827. Re-elected in 1829. Resigned to become U.S. Minister to France.
William C. Rives (Milton)	Jacksonian	March 4, 1825 – April 17, 1829	18th 19th 20th 21st	Elected in 1823. Re-elected in 1825. Re-elected in 1827. Re-elected in 1829. Resigned to become U.S. Minister to France.
Vacant		April 18, 1829 – January 24, 1830	21st	
William F. Gordon (Charlottesville)	Jacksonian	January 25, 1830 – March 3, 1833	21st 22nd	Elected in 1829 to finish Rives's term and seated January 25, 1830. Re-elected in 1831. Redistricted to the 12th district.
Joseph W. Chinn (Nuttsville)	Jacksonian	March 4, 1833 – March 3, 1835	23rd	Elected in 1833. Lost re-election.
John Taliaferro (Fredericksburg)	Anti-Jacksonian	March 4, 1835 – March 3, 1837	24th 25th 26th 27th	Elected in 1835. Re-elected in 1837. Re-elected in 1839. Re-elected in 1841. Retired.
John Taliaferro (Fredericksburg)	Whig	March 4, 1837 – March 3, 1843	24th 25th 26th 27th	Elected in 1835. Re-elected in 1837. Re-elected in 1839. Re-elected in 1841. Retired.
William Lucas (Charlestown)	Democratic	March 4, 1843 – March 3, 1845	28th	Elected in 1843. Lost re-election.
Henry Bedinger III (Charlestown)	Democratic	March 4, 1845 – March 3, 1849	29th 30th	Elected in 1845. Re-elected in 1847. Lost re-election.
Richard Parker (Berryville)	Democratic	March 4, 1849 – March 3, 1851	31st	Elected in 1849. Elected Virginia Circuit Court judge.
Charles J. Faulkner (Martinsburg)	Whig	March 4, 1851 – March 3, 1853	32nd	Elected in 1851. Redistricted to the 8th district.
Zedekiah Kidwell (Fairmont)	Democratic	March 4, 1853 – March 3, 1857	33rd 34th	Elected in 1853. Re-elected in 1855. Retired.
Sherrard Clemens (Wheeling)	Democratic	March 4, 1857 – March 3, 1861	35th 36th	Elected in 1857. Re-elected in 1859. Retired.
William G. Brown (Kingwood)	Union	March 4, 1861 – March 3, 1863	37th	Elected in 1861. Retired.
District inactive		March 4, 1863 – June 19, 1863	38th	Civil War
District moved to West Virginia June 20, 1863
District re-established March 4, 1885
John R. Tucker (Lexington)	Democratic	March 4, 1885 – March 3, 1887	49th	Elected in 1884. Retired.
Jacob Yost (Staunton)	Republican	March 4, 1887 – March 3, 1889	50th	Elected in 1886. Lost re-election.
Henry S. Tucker III (Staunton)	Democratic	March 4, 1889 – March 3, 1897	51st 52nd 53rd 54th	Elected in 1888. Re-elected in 1890. Re-elected in 1892. Re-elected in 1894. Retired.
Jacob Yost (Staunton)	Republican	March 4, 1897 – March 3, 1899	55th	Elected in 1896..
Julian M. Quarles (Staunton)	Democratic	March 4, 1899 – March 3, 1901	56th	Elected in 1898. Retired.
Henry D. Flood (Appomattox)	Democratic	March 4, 1901 – December 8, 1921	57th 58th 59th 60th 61st 62nd 63rd 64th 65th 66th 67th	Elected in 1900. Re-elected in 1902. Re-elected in 1904. Re-elected in 1906. Re-elected in 1908. Re-elected in 1910. Re-elected in 1912. Re-elected in 1914. Re-elected in 1916. Re-elected in 1918. Re-elected in 1920. Died.
Vacant		December 9, 1921 – March 20, 1922	67th	
Henry S. Tucker III (Lexington)	Democratic	March 21, 1922 – July 23, 1932	67th 68th 69th 70th 71st 72nd	Elected to finish Flood's term. Re-elected in 1922. Re-elected in 1924. Re-elected in 1926. Re-elected in 1928. Re-elected in 1930. Died.
Vacant		July 24, 1932 – November 7, 1932	72nd	
Joel W. Flood (Appomattox)	Democratic	November 8, 1932 – March 3, 1933	72nd	Elected to finish Tucker's term. Retired.
District dissolved March 4, 1933
District re-established January 3, 1953
Joel T. Broyhill (Arlington)	Republican	January 3, 1953 – December 31, 1974	83rd 84th 85th 86th 87th 88th 89th 90th 91st 92nd 93rd	Elected in 1952. Re-elected in 1954. Re-elected in 1956. Re-elected in 1958. Re-elected in 1960. Re-elected in 1962. Re-elected in 1964. Re-elected in 1966. Re-elected in 1968. Re-elected in 1970. Re-elected in 1972. Lost re-election.
Vacant		December 31, 1974 – January 3, 1975	93rd	
Joseph L. Fisher (Arlington)	Democratic	January 3, 1975 – January 3, 1981	94th 95th 96th	Elected in 1974. Re-elected in 1976. Re-elected in 1978. Lost re-election.
Frank R. Wolf (Vienna)	Republican	January 3, 1981 – January 3, 2015	97th 98th 99th 100th 101st 102nd 103rd 104th 105th 106th 107th 108th 109th 110th 111th 112th 113th	Elected in 1980. Re-elected in 1982. Re-elected in 1984. Re-elected in 1986. Re-elected in 1988. Re-elected in 1990. Re-elected in 1992. Re-elected in 1994. Re-elected in 1996. Re-elected in 1998. Re-elected in 2000. Re-elected in 2002. Re-elected in 2004. Re-elected in 2006. Re-elected in 2008. Re-elected in 2010. Re-elected in 2012. Retired.
Barbara Comstock (McLean)	Republican	January 3, 2015 – January 3, 2019	114th 115th	Elected in 2014. Re-elected in 2016. Lost re-election.
Jennifer Wexton (Leesburg)	Democratic	January 3, 2019 – January 3, 2025	116th 117th 118th	Elected in 2018. Re-elected in 2020. Re-elected in 2022. Retired citing a diagnosis of progressive supranuclear palsy.
Suhas Subramanyam (Brambleton)	Democratic	January 3, 2025 – present	119th	Elected in 2024. Re-elected in 2026.

== Historical district boundaries ==
The Virginia Third District started in 1788 covering the counties of New Kent, Elizabeth City, Warwick, York, Charles City, Chesterfield, Henrico, Hanover and James City.

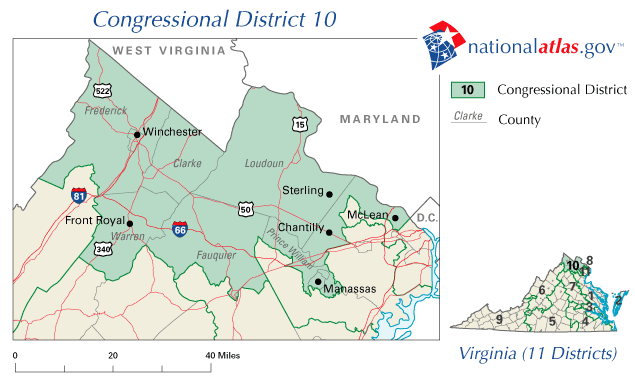
2003–2013

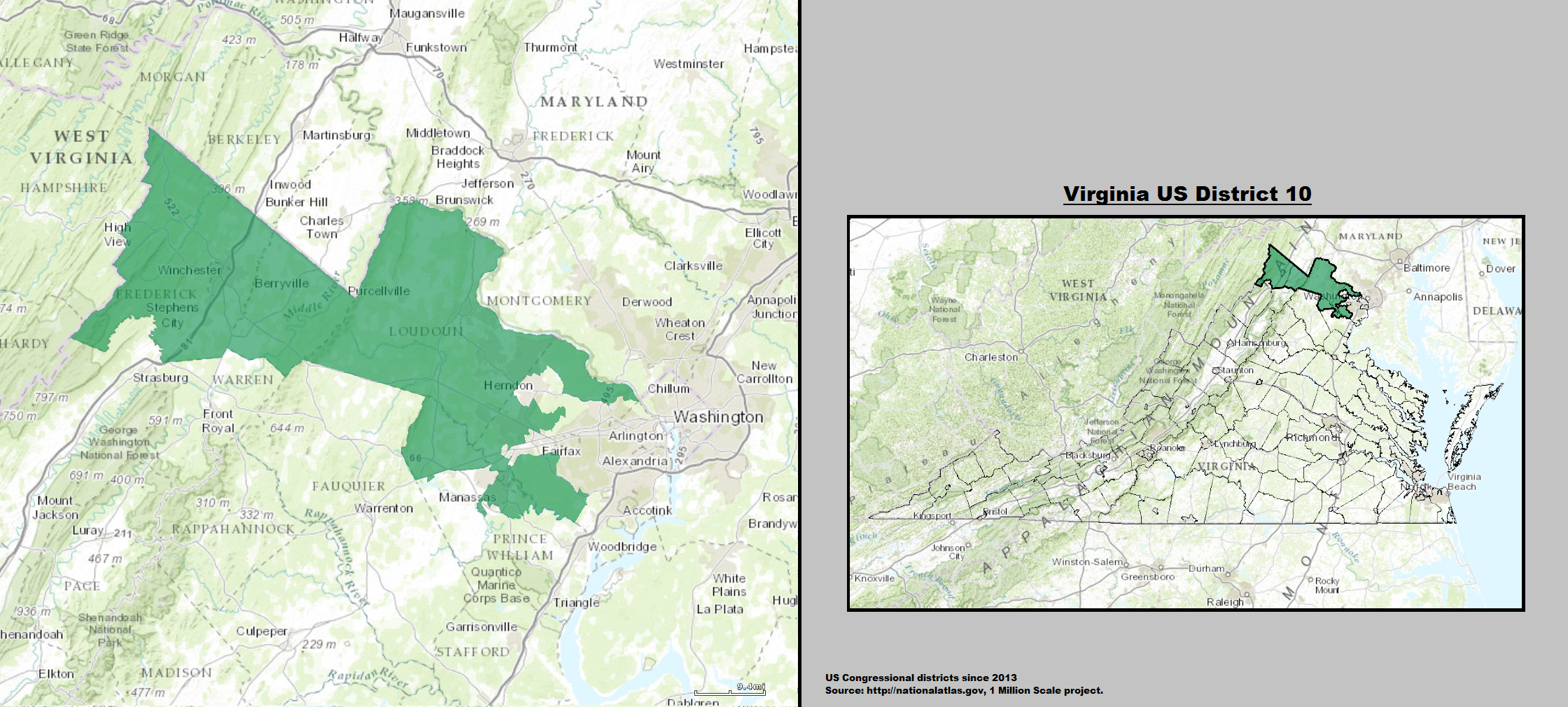
2013–2023

== See also ==
- Virginia's congressional districts
- List of United States congressional districts
- Virginia's 10th congressional district election, 2018
