= County Center, Virginia =

County Center
- CDP
- Location in Prince William County and the state of Virginia.
- Coordinates: 38°40′24″N 77°21′2″W
- Country: United States
- State: Virginia
- County: Prince William
- Founded: March 29, 2002
- Named for: McCoart Government Center

Government
  - Type: Board of Directors
  - President of the Board of Directors: Michael Ullmann (Nonpartisan)

Area
  - Total: 2.00 sq mi (5.18 km^{2})
- Elevation: 212 ft (65 m)

Population (2010)
  - Total: 3,270
  - Estimate (2021): 4,045
  - Density: 1,630/sq mi (631/km^{2})
- Time zone: UTC−5 (Eastern (EST))
  - Summer (DST): UTC−4 (EDT)
- ZIP Codes: 22192
- Area codes: 703, 571
- FIPS code: 51-19571
- GNIS feature ID: 2631346
- Website: pwcchoa.com

County Center is a census-designated place in Prince William County, Virginia, United States. The population as of the 2010 census was 3,270. In 2021, the United States Census Bureau estimated it to be 4,045. It is notable for including the county's McCoart Government Center off Prince William Parkway, along with adjoining Pfitzner Stadium, former home field of the Potomac Nationals, now the Fredericksburg Nationals.

== History ==
On March 29, 2002, the Declarant of developers who owned the land that made up County Center established the Prince William County Center Owners' Association, a not for profit corporation, to provide services to County Center's residents.

== Recreational and cultural activities ==
The Prince William County Center Clubhouse, located on Wermuth Way (the headquarters of the Association), can be rented out for private functions.

=== Parks and recreation ===
County Center is home to a few green spaces, with approximately 1.5 miles of trails.

County Center is home to the western part of Old Hickory Golf Club, designed by architect Tim Freeland. County Center is also near the Lake Ridge Golf Course in Lake Ridge.

County Center is about three miles from the Neabsco Greenway Trail, four miles from the Lakeridge Marina Waterfront Trail and roughly six miles from the Bull Run Occoquan Trail.

Airport Creek, a small tributary of the Occoquan Reservoir, is located in County Center.

County Center is home to River Falls Pool on Chanceford Drive, and the community pool behind the Clubhouse.

The Association operates two tennis courts in County Center.

Earl M. Cunard Park, a Prince William County park, is located off of Ridgefield Village Drive and is home to about half a mile of trails and two basketball courts.

The Prince William County Liberty Memorial features four steel bars from the World Trade Center which fell from the sky during the September 11, 2001 attacks. A plaque at the memorial features the inscribed names of the 22 residents of the Prince William County area who died in the attacks that day.

The G. Richard Pfitzner Stadium was the home of the Potomac Nationals Minor League Baseball team from 1984 until 2019, when they relocated to Fredericksburg. The "Pfitz" also hosts community events, such as outdoor movies during the summer. Adjacent to the stadium is NOVA BMX, a bicycle motocross track sponsored by Barnes and Thornburg.

== Transportation ==
Three major state highways directly serve County Center: Virginia State Route 294 (Prince William Parkway), which connects County Center to Manassas, Virginia State Route 28 (Centreville Road), and Virginia State Route 234 (Dumfries Road, which then becomes Prince William Parkway), in the west, and Woodbridge, Interstate 95, and U.S. Route 1 in the east; Virginia State Route 642 (Hoadly Road), which forms part of the CDP's western border and connects it to Virginia State Route 234 and Independent Hill in the south; and Virginia State Route 663 (Davis Ford Road), which forms part of the CDP's western border and connects it to Virginia State Route 612 and Buckhall in the north.

County Center is served by two bus stations: Prince William Parkway at McCoart Government Center, along the 96 route, which connects it to Manassas in the west and Dale City in the east, and Prince William Parkway at Marblestone Drive, which connects it to Lake Ridge in the north and Dale City in the south.

== Geography ==
County Center is located in southeastern Prince William County. Neighboring communities are Lake Ridge to the east and Dale City to the south.

According to the United States Census Bureau, the County Center CDP has a total area of 2.0 square miles.

The community is drained by Airport Creek, an east-flowing tributary of the Occoquan Reservoir, which then flows south into the Occoquan River watershed, and eventually the tidal Potomac River.

== Climate ==
The climate in this area is characterized by hot, humid summers and generally mild to cool winters. According to the Köppen climate classification system, County Center has a humid subtropical climate, abbreviated "Cfa" on climate maps.

Climate data for County Center, Virginia, 1930–present
| Month | Jan | Feb | Mar | Apr | May | Jun | Jul | Aug | Sep | Oct | Nov | Dec | Year |
|---|---|---|---|---|---|---|---|---|---|---|---|---|---|
| Record high °F (°C) | 77 (25) | 76 (24.4) | 85 (29.4) | 95 (35) | 96 (35.6) | 100 (37.8) | 104 (40) | 103 (39.4) | 101 (38.3) | 93 (33.9) | 85 (29.4) | 75 (23.9) | 104 (40) |
| Average high °F (°C) | 43.7 (6.5) | 45.7 (7.6) | 56.3 (13.5) | 67.3 (19.6) | 76.8 (24.9) | 84.3 (29.1) | 88.3 (31.3) | 86.5 (30.3) | 80.6 (27) | 69.1 (20.6) | 57.6 (14.2) | 46.4 (8) | 66.9 (19.4) |
| Average low °F (°C) | 24.2 (-4.3) | 25 (-3.9) | 33 (0.6) | 42.2 (5.7) | 52.2 (11.2) | 60.4 (15.8) | 65.3 (18.5) | 63.9 (17.7) | 57.1 (13.9) | 44.7 (7.1) | 35.3 (1.8) | 27.1 (-2.7) | 44.2 (6.8) |
| Record low °F (°C) | -8 (-22.2) | -21 (-29.4) | -5 (-20.6) | 19 (-7.2) | 29 (-1.7) | 40 (4.4) | 48 (8.9) | 40 (4.4) | 33 (0.6) | 19 (-7.2) | 9 (-12.8) | -2 (-18.9) | -21 (-29.4) |
| Average precipitation inches (mm) | 2.4 (62) | 2.5 (63) | 2.9 (73) | 2.9 (74) | 3.5 (88) | 3.4 (85) | 3.5 (88) | 3.4 (86) | 3 (76) | 2.7 (68) | 2.6 (67) | 3 (76) | 35.7 (906) |
| Average snowfall inches (cm) | 4.9 (12.4) | 6.4 (16.3) | 2.4 (6.1) | 0.1 (0.2) | 0 (0) | 0 (0) | 0 (0) | 0 (0) | 0 (0) | 0 (0) | 0.7 (1.8) | 2.4 (6.1) | 17 (43.2) |
| Average precipitation days | 6 | 6 | 7 | 8 | 8 | 7 | 8 | 7 | 5 | 5 | 6 | 6 | 81 |

== Government ==
County Center is a census-designated place within Prince William County; therefore, schools, roads, and law enforcement are provided by the county.

=== Board of directors ===
The board of directors is the executive branch of the community government, led by the president, currently Michael Ullmann, and the vice president, currently Julia Brown. All five members of the board are elected by the residents of County Center.

According to the Bylaws, the duties and responsibilities of the board include:

"(1) Provide goods and services in accordance with the Association Documents, and provide for the Upkeep of the Common Area and, to the extent provided in the Association Documents, of the lots.

(2) Designate, hire, dismiss and, where appropriate, compensate the personnel necessary to provide for the Upkeep of the Common Area, the general administration of the Association, and, to the extent provided in the Association Documents, of the Lots, and to provide goods and services, as well as purchase equipment, supplies and materials to be used by such personnel in the performance of their duties.

(3) Collect the Assessments, deposit the proceeds thereof in depositories designated by the board of directors and use the proceeds to carry out the Upkeep of the Property and other real estate and facilities (to the extent the Association is so authorized by the Association Documents) and the general administration of the Association.

(4) Adopt and amend any reasonable Rules and Regulations not inconsistent with the Association Documents.

(5) Open bank accounts on behalf of the Association and designate the signatories thereon.

(6) Enforce the provisions of the Association Documents.

(7) Act with respect to all matters arising out of any eminent domain proceeding affecting the Common Area.

(8) Notify the Owners of any litigation against the Association involving a claim in excess of ten percent of the total Annual Assessment.

(9) Obtain and carry insurance against casualties and liabilities, as provided in Article 10 of the Declaration, pay the premiums therefor and adjust and settle any claims thereunder.

(10) Pay the cost of all authorized goods and services rendered to the Association.

(11) Notify the appropriate Mortgagee of any default by an Owner in paying Assessments (which remains uncured for sixty days) or of any other default, simultaneously with the notice sent to the defaulting Owner.

(12) Provide an Association Disclosure Packet or Common Expense Statement with respect to a Lot within fourteen days (or as otherwise required by law) after a written request and payment of the appropriate fee in accordance with Section 6.6 of the Declaration.

(13) Prepare an annual budget in accordance with Article 6 of the Declaration.

(14) Adopt an annual budget and make Assessments to defray the Common Expenses of the Association, establish the means and methods of collecting such Assessments and establish the period of the installment payment, if any, of the Annual Assessment in accordance with Article 6 of the Declaration.

(15) Borrow money on behalf of the Association, when required for any valid purpose; provided, however, that either a Majority Vote of the Owners obtained at a meeting held for such purpose or written approval by Owners entitled to cast more than fifty percent of the total number of votes shall be required to borrow any sum in excess of ten percent of the total Annual Assessment for that fiscal year or, subject to Section 15.4 of the Declaration, mortgage any of the Common Area. The Board of Directors, by a vote of two-thirds of the total number of directors, shall have the right and power to assign and pledge all revenues to be received by the Association, including but not limited to Annual and Additional Assessments in order to secure the repayment of any sums borrowed by the Association from time to time.

(16) Sign deeds, leases, plats of resubdivision and applications for construction permits or similar documents for the Common Area as may be necessary or desirable in the normal course of the orderly development of the Property, at the request of the Declarant or on its own determination.

(17) Dedicate, lease or transfer any portion of the Common Area or grant or terminate easements, right-of-way or licenses over and through all the Common Area pursuant to Section 3.2 of the Declaration and subject to the restriction set forth in Section 15.4 of the Declaration.

(18) In its sole discretion, designate certain portions of the Common Area as Reserved Common Area, pursuant to Section 3.8 of the Declaration, and impose such restrictions and conditions on the use thereof as the Board of Directors deems appropriate.

(19) In accordance with Section 12.1 of the Declaration, suspend the right of any Owner or other occupant of a Lot, and the right of such Person's household or company, tenants, guests, customers, employees, agents and invitees to use the Common Area.

(20) Acquire, hold and dispose of Lots to enforce the collection of Assessments and mortgage the same without the prior approval of the Owners if such expenditures and hypothecations are included in the budget.

(21) Charge reasonable fees for the use of the Common Area, where appropriate, and for services and allow non-owners to use portions of the Common Area on a fee arrangement determined by the Board.

(22) Do anything else not inconsistent with the Act or the Association Documents."

The board also establishes committees which handle specific issues, appoints their chairpersons, and can choose to appoint their members or allow the chairperson to do so. The board must meet at least once a quarter, and can meet more often at its own discretion (not including special meetings); the board is allowed to meet anywhere in the Commonwealth of Virginia, but the Clubhouse is the standard meeting place.

=== Representation ===
The parts of County Center south of the Prince William Parkway, including the Clubhouse, are within Virginia's 11th congressional district, currently represented in Congress by Representative Gerry Connolly (D-Mantua), while the rest of County Center is within Virginia's 1st congressional district, currently represented in Congress by Representative Rob Wittman (R-Montross). County Center is represented by Hala Ayala (D-Lake Ridge) in the state House of Delegates, and the parts of County Center south of the Prince William Parkway are represented by Jeremy McPike (D-Dale City), while the rest of County Center is represented by George Barker (D-Clifton) in the state Senate.

== Local media ==
County Center lies within the distribution zone for two national newspapers, the Washington Post, and the Washington Times, as well as for the local Prince William Times. County Center is also covered by AOL's Patch service's Dale City and Lake Ridge-Occoquan divisions.

== Education ==
=== Primary and secondary schools ===
As a part of Prince William County, County Center is served by Prince William County Public Schools and private schools. County Center is served by one high school, Colgan High School, in nearby Independent Hill. Middle schoolers in County Center attend Benton Middle School.

==== Public elementary schools ====
- Penn Elementary School
- Westridge Elementary School

=== Colleges and universities ===
County Center is near multiple higher education centers, including Strayer University, Northern Virginia Community College – Woodbridge Campus, University of Valley Forge – Woodbridge Campus, Stratford University, and the Carolina University of Theology – Northern Virginia Campus.

=== Public libraries ===
County Center is served by the Chinn Park Library, a branch of Prince William County Public Libraries.

== Demographics ==
Historical population
| Census | Pop. | Note | %± |
|---|---|---|---|
| 2010 | 3,270 | | — |
| 2020 | 3,787 | | 15.8% |
U.S. Decennial Census; 2000 2010

County Center was first listed as a census designated place in the 2010 U.S. census formed from parts of the Dale City CDP and Lake Ridge CDP and additional area.

=== 2020 census ===
As of the 2020 census, County Center had a population of 3,787. The median age was 36.4 years. 29.7% of residents were under the age of 18 and 7.8% were 65 years of age or older. For every 100 females there were 85.8 males, and for every 100 females age 18 and over there were 82.5 males age 18 and over.

100.0% of residents lived in urban areas, while 0.0% lived in rural areas.

There were 1,213 households, of which 46.6% had children under the age of 18 living in them. Of all households, 55.0% were married-couple households, 10.0% were households with a male householder and no spouse or partner present, and 30.3% were households with a female householder and no spouse or partner present. About 15.9% of all households were made up of individuals and 3.6% had someone living alone who was 65 years of age or older.

There were 1,247 housing units, of which 2.7% were vacant. The homeowner vacancy rate was 0.4% and the rental vacancy rate was 4.7%.

Racial composition as of the 2020 census
| Race | Number | Percent |
|---|---|---|
| White | 1,256 | 33.2% |
| Black or African American | 1,358 | 35.9% |
| American Indian and Alaska Native | 19 | 0.5% |
| Asian | 444 | 11.7% |
| Native Hawaiian and Other Pacific Islander | 1 | 0.0% |
| Some other race | 242 | 6.4% |
| Two or more races | 467 | 12.3% |
| Hispanic or Latino (of any race) | 548 | 14.5% |

=== Demographic estimates ===
As of 2021, County Center has a median household income of $119,926.
