= Virginia State Route 234 =

State highway in Prince William County, Virginia, US

State Route 234

Route information
- Maintained by VDOT
- Length: 33.92 mi (54.59 km)
- Existed: 1933–present

Major junctions
- South end: US 1 in Dumfries
- I-95 in Dumfries; SR 294 / SR 649 in Brentsville; SR 28 in Manassas; I-66 near Manassas; US 29 near Gainesville
- North end: US 15 / SR 601 near Haymarket

Location
- Country: United States
- State: Virginia
- Counties: Prince William

Highway system
- Virginia Routes; Interstate; US; Primary; Secondary; Byways; History; HOT lanes
← SR 233	→ SR 235

Virginia State Route 234 (SR 234) is a primary state highway in the U.S. state of Virginia. It runs from U.S. Route 1 near Dumfries via Independent Hill as Dumfries Road, bypasses Manassas as Prince William Parkway, and has a brief concurrency with Interstate 66 for 2.27 miles (3.65 km) between exits 44 and 47 before continuing northwest via Catharpin to U.S. Route 15 near Woolsey as Sudley Road.

== Route description ==
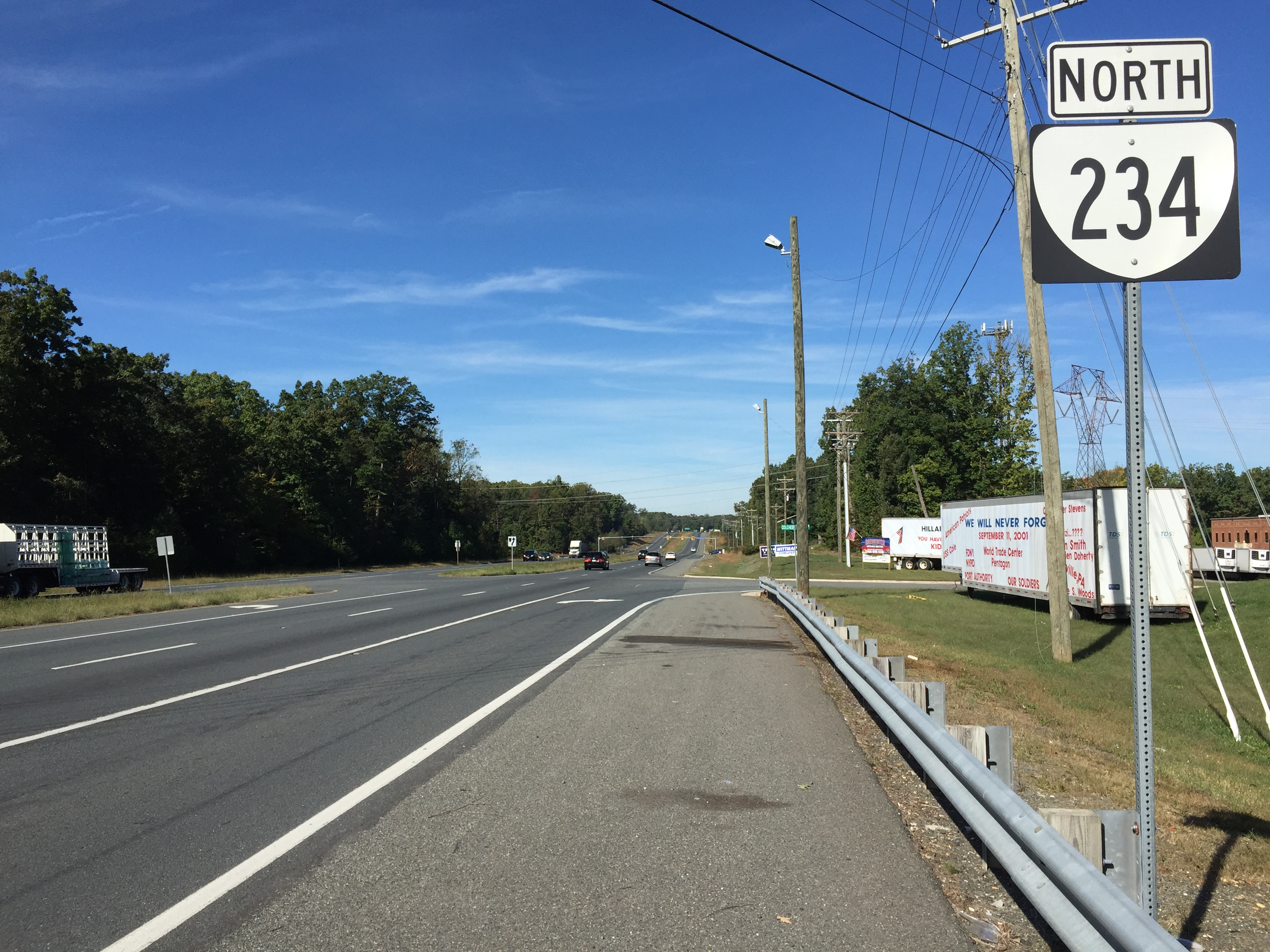
View north along SR 234 in Independent Hill

SR 234 begins at an intersection with US 1 (Jefferson Davis Highway) on the northern edge of the town of Dumfries. The state highway heads northwest as Dumfries Road, a six-lane divided highway that passes southwest of the Dumfries Road Commuter Lot, a park and ride facility, before it meets I-95 at a partial cloverleaf interchange. North of Dumfries, SR 234 parallels Quantico Creek and follows the border of Prince William Forest Park to the southwest. The state highway also passes many residential subdivisions on the highway's northbound side in the community of Montclair, where the highway reduces to four lanes at Country Club Drive. SR 234 curves to the north at Independent Hill, which the highway bypasses. The old alignment through the village, which contains the remains of the Greenwood Gold Mine, is designated SR 234 Old. SR 234 passes through the communities of Canova, Cornwell, and Lake Jackson, where the highway crosses the Occoquan River just east of the community's namesake reservoir. Just north of Lake Jackson, the state highway intersects Prince William Parkway (SR 294), which connects Manassas and Woodbridge.

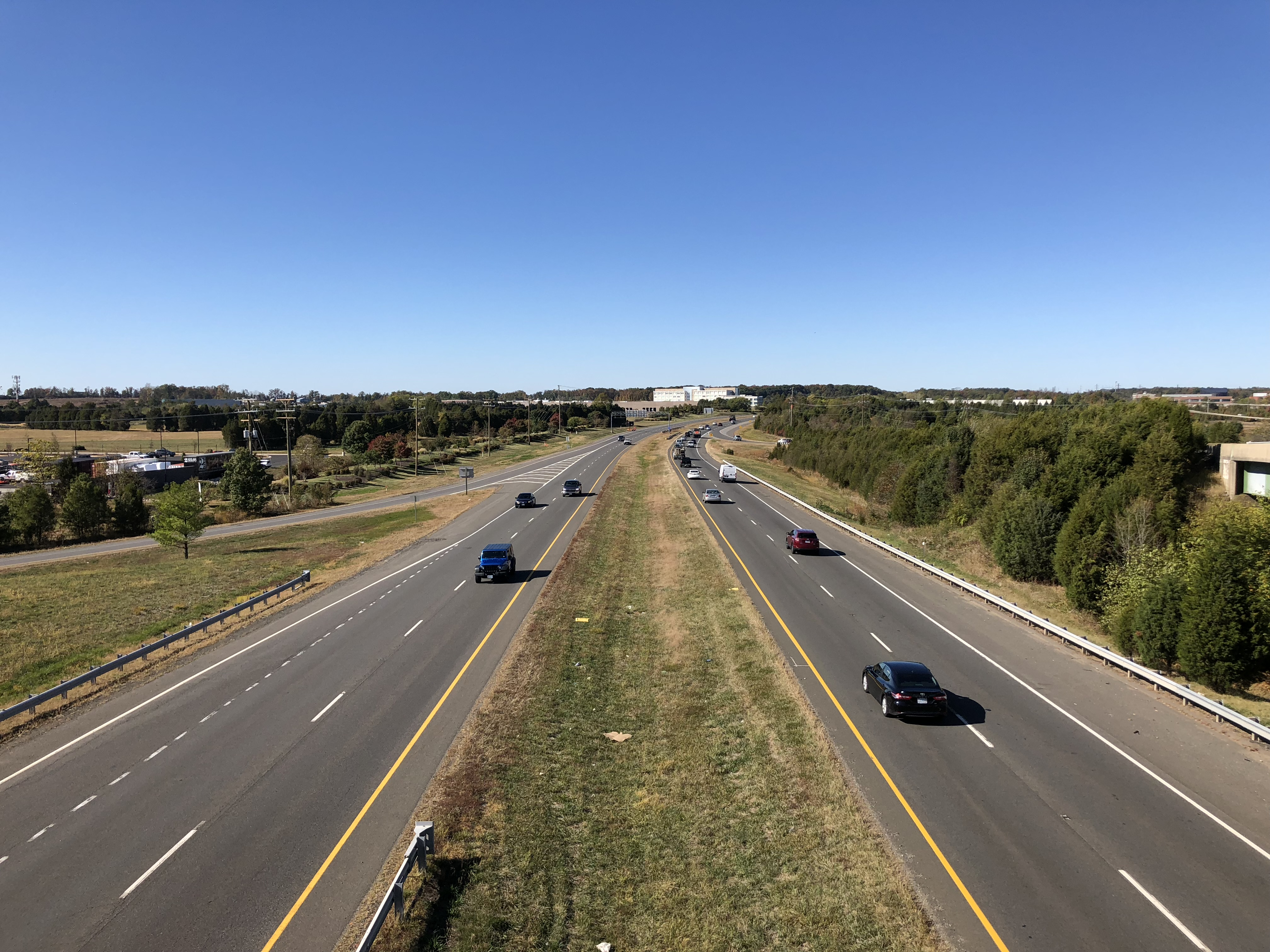
SR 234 just north of Manassas

Just north of Prince William Parkway, Dumfries Road turns north toward the city of Manassas as SR 234 Business. SR 234 continues northwest as Prince William Parkway, a four-lane divided highway western bypass of Manassas. The state highway passes to the east of Manassas Regional Airport, which is accessed via Clover Hill Road. Just north of the airport, SR 234 crosses over Norfolk Southern Railway's Washington District rail line, which is also used by Virginia Railway Express's Manassas Line, whose western terminus is at the Broad Run/Airport just to the west in the community of Bristow. Just north of the rail line, the state highway meets SR 28 (Nokesville Road) at a three-level interchange featuring flyover ramps from both directions of SR 28 to SR 234. SR 234 continues north past the Prince William Science and Technology Campus of George Mason University, which features the Hylton Performing Arts Center, then intersects SR 674 (Wellington Road) and Sudley Manor Drive, which connects Linton Hall to the southwest with Bull Run to the northeast. SR 234 continues northwest, intersecting Balls Ford Road before reaching a trumpet interchange with I-66, at exit 44 on I-66. SR 234 joins the interstate in a concurrency east for three miles to a partial cloverleaf interchange with Sudley Road at exit 47, where SR 234 leaves the concurrency and meets the northern end of SR 234 Business.

SR 234 heads north from I-66 as a four-lane divided highway that reduces to two lanes at the entrance to the Manassas Campus of Northern Virginia Community College, and then enters Manassas National Battlefield Park, site of the First and Second Battles of Bull Run. The state highway intersects US 29 (Lee Highway) within the battlefield park. After leaving the preserve, SR 234 passes through the community of Sudley Springs, where the highway crosses Little Bull Run and curves to the west. The state highway heads through the community of Catharpin before reaching its northern terminus at US 15 (James Madison Highway) in the hamlet of Woolsey north of Haymarket.

== History ==
Most of SR 234 southeast of Manassas, for 15.85 miles (25.51 km) from State Route 28 in Manassas towards State Route 31 (U.S. Route 1) at Dumfries, was added to the state highway system in 1928 as State Route 709. The final 2.50 miles (4.02 km) were added in 1929, making SR 709 a continuous Manassas-Dumfries route.

In the other direction, from Manassas northwest towards Gilberts Corner, 6.42 miles (10.33 km) were added in 1930 and 1931. In 1932, the rest of the road to Gilberts Corner, now State Route 705 and U.S. Route 15 north of Catharpin, was added to the state highway system.

SR 709 became State Route 234 in the 1933 renumbering, as did State Route 721 (Brunswick, Maryland to south of Purcellville, now State Route 287 and part of State Route 690). The gap from U.S. Route 50 at Aldie (west of Gilberts Corner) northwest to Philomont on State Route 734 and then north towards Purcellville on SR 690 was never filled.

In the 1940 renumbering, the northern piece of SR 234 (through Purcellville) became part of State Route 17. SR 234 was rerouted to continue northwest on SR 734 from Philomont to Bluemont (also never transferred to the primary system), where it absorbed the short State Route 245 to State Route 7. At the same time, a short piece of SR 234 south of Gilberts Corner also became U.S. Route 15. Also around that time, SR 234 was rerouted to head west rather than northwest from Catharpin, using a longer piece of new US 15 (from Woolsey north to Gilberts Corner). The piece at Bluemont was transferred to the secondary system in 1943, truncating SR 234 back to Gilberts Corner and beyond to its current end at US 15.

In 2005, the Commonwealth of Virginia designated Route 234 between U.S. Route 1 and Interstate 66 as the Ronald Wilson Reagan Memorial Highway.

== Recent construction ==
The 2005 widening of SR 234 to four lanes in the areas of Independent Hill and Canova have resulted in some minor realignments. A former stretch of SR 234 through Canova has been renamed Canova Drive, and SR 234 was moved about 1 block east. At Independent Hill, Bristow Road has been extended onto former SR 234, and SR 234 itself was realigned about 300 meters north.

During the late 1990s the SR 234 Bypass was constructed to route through traffic from I-66 to the southeast around downtown Manassas. The existing portion of SR 234 was renamed SR 234 Business.

=== SR 234 and Balls Ford Road interchange ===
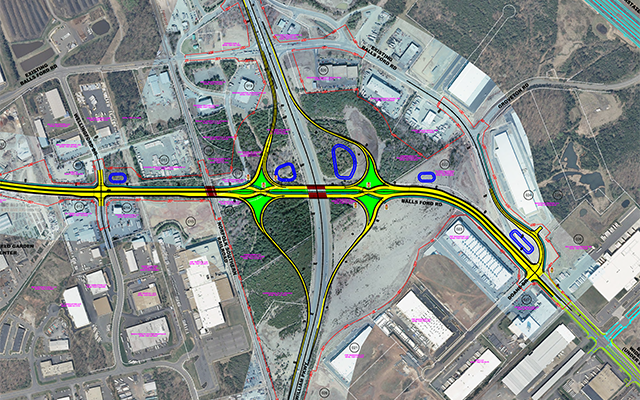
A rendering of the new intersection of SR 234 at Balls Ford Road, complete with a realignment of Balls Ford Road.

As a part of the Transform 66 project, the previous at-grade intersection of SR 234 and Balls Ford Road has been converted to a diverging diamond interchange at a cost of $167 million. As a part of this project, Balls Ford Road was realigned about 0.50 miles (0.80 km) south, where the interchange was constructed, and a new grade-separated bridge was built over the Norfolk Southern Railroad Line. In addition, Balls Ford Road was widened from a two lanes street to a four-lane divided roadway between its intersection at Devlin Road / Wellington Road through the interchange to Doane Drive. This project coincides with a separate project to widen Balls Ford Road between Doane Drive to Ashton Avenue. Construction bagan in fall 2020 and was completed in late 2022.

=== SR 234 and University Boulevard intersection ===
A quadrant roadway intersection exists at the intersection of SR 234 and University Boulevard in Manassas. Construction began in fall 2020 and was completed in fall 2022.

== Parkway initiatives ==
=== Bi-County Parkway ===
The Northern Virginia Transportation Alliance has recommended a new limited access highway extending SR 234 past its intersection with I-66. The highway would junction and re-connect with current SR 234 in Catharpin near the Manassas National Battlefield, and then follow current SR 659 to US 50 in Loudoun County. The goal of the project is to connect Prince William County and Loudoun county to alleviate congestion between Manassas and Washington Dulles International Airport. While the Loudoun County Commonwealth Transportation Board has approved the project, many Prince William County residents oppose the plan. In March 2016, the Prince William County Board of Supervisors voted to remove the Bi-County Parkway from its long-range planning blueprint.

=== Tri-County Parkway ===
The Northern Virginia Transportation Alliance has also proposed a Tri-County Parkway. The highway would start near the intersection of SR 234 and SR 28 and follow Godwin Drive to I-66. It would then follow SR 621 east of Manassas National Battlefield Park, ultimately connecting to Loudoun County Parkway. The project would link Loudoun, Fairfax, and Prince William Counties and provide an alternate route between Manassas, I-66 and Washington Dulles International Airport. Some Prince William County supervisors support construction to extend Godwin Drive, as opposed to the Tri-County Parkway, due to the lower cost and lesser disruptive impact on residents and businesses. The project is supported by Prince William Supervisor Pete Candland.

== Movie filming ==
A completed portion of the bypass was used prior to it being open to traffic as a scene in the 1998 disaster film, Deep Impact. About 2,100 extras and 1,870 vehicles were used to stage the traffic jam scene for that film.

== Major intersections ==
County	Location	mi	km	Destinations	Notes
Prince William	Dumfries	0.00	0.00	US 1 (Jefferson Davis Highway) – Triangle, Woodbridge, Weems-Botts Museum	Southern terminus
Prince William		0.55	0.89	I-95 – Richmond, Washington	Exit 152 (I-95); partial cloverleaf interchange
Prince William	Independent Hill	7.90	12.71	SR 619 west (Bristow Road) to SR 646 / SR 3245 – Quantico National Cemetery, Prince William Forest Park	Former SR 234 north; eastern terminus of SR 619
Prince William	Independent Hill	8.90	14.32	SR 3245 south (Independent Hill Drive) to SR 646 / SR 619 – Quantico National Cemetery, Prince William Forest Park	Former SR 234 south; northern terminus of SR 3245
Prince William	Brentsville	14.50	23.34	SR 294 east (Prince William Parkway) / SR 649 west (Brentsville Road) – Woodbridge	Prince William Parkway transitions from SR 294 to SR 234 north; western terminus of SR 294; eastern terminus of SR 649
Prince William	Brentsville	14.68	23.63	SR 234 Bus. north (Dumfries Road) – Manassas, Novant Health UVA Health System Prince William Medical Center	Southern terminus of SR 234 Business
Prince William	Brentsville	16.59	26.70	Clover Hill Road – Manassas Regional Airport	
City of Manassas		18.20	29.29	SR 28 to US 17 – Manassas	Interchange
Prince William		19.20	30.90	SR 840 (University Boulevard) – George Mason University-Prince William Science and Technology campus Campus	
Prince William		20.02	32.22	SR 674 (Wellington Road)	
Prince William	Wellington	22.15	35.65	SR 621 (Balls Ford Road) to SR 234 Bus.	Interchange
Prince William	Wellington	22.75	36.61	I-66 west – Front Royal	Southern end of concurrency with I-66; exit 44 (I-66); northwestern terminus of Prince William Parkway
Prince William		25.02	40.27	I-66 east / SR 234 Bus. south (Sudley Road) – Washington, Manassas	Northern end of concurrency with I-66; exit 47 (I-66); northern terminus of SR 234 Business
Prince William		26.33	42.37	US 29 (Lee Highway) to I-66 – Warrenton, Washington	
Prince William	Woolsey	33.92	54.59	US 15 (James Madison Highway) / SR 601 (Waterfall Road) – Culpeper, Leesburg	Northern terminus
1.000 mi = 1.609 km; 1.000 km = 0.621 mi: Concurrency terminus; Route transition; Unopened

== Related routes ==
State Route 234 Business
- Location: Manassas
- Length: 6.95 mi (11.18 km)
- Existed: 1933–present

=== Route 234 Business (Manassas) ===
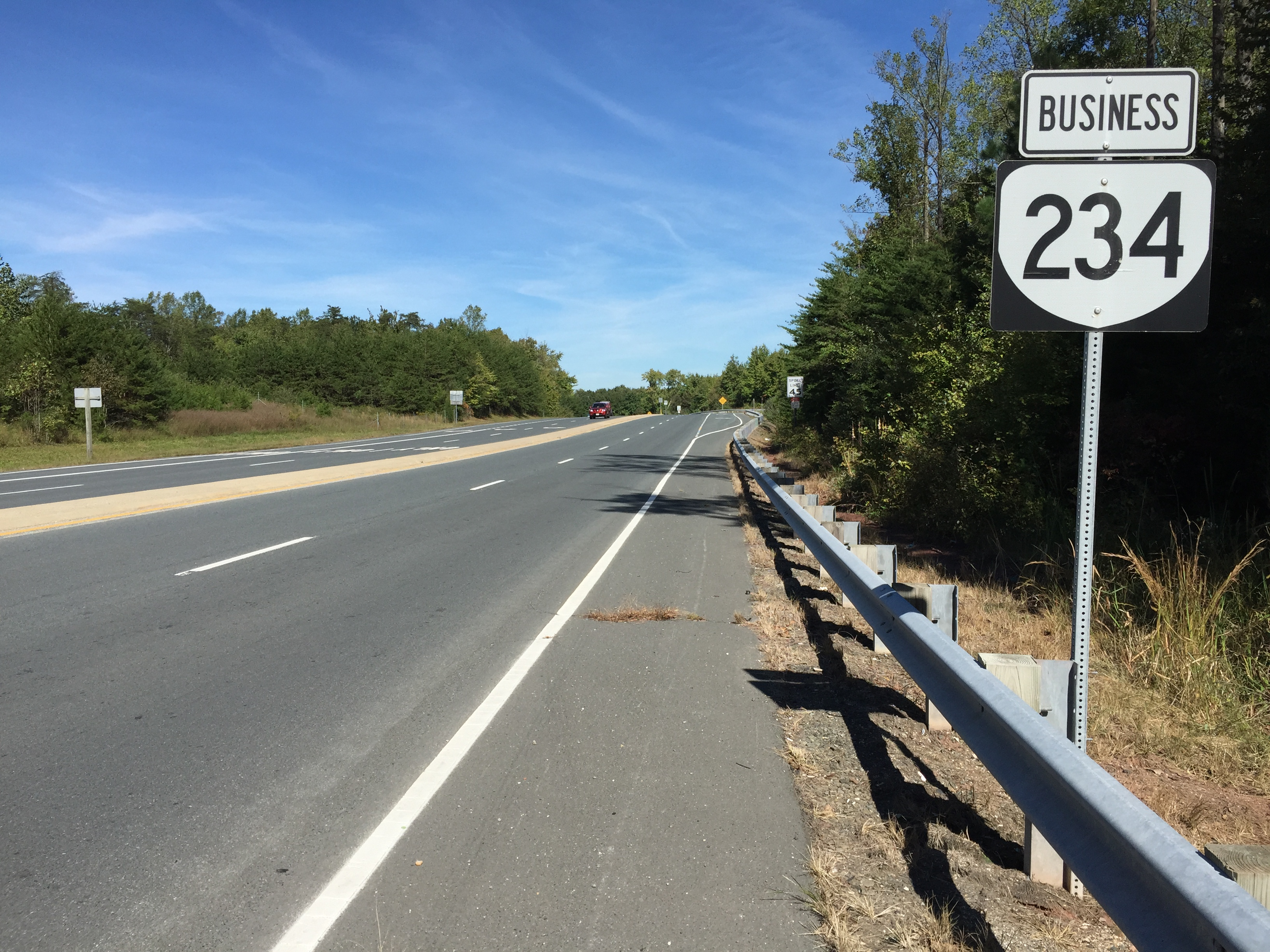
View north at the southern end of SR 234 Bus. at SR 234 in Manassas

State Route 234 Business (SR 234 Bus. or 234-BR on some maps) in Manassas is a bannered primary state highway in the U.S. state of Virginia, and traverses both Prince William County and the City of Manassas. SR 234 Business is known by three names: Dumfries Road in Prince William County and Manassas, Grant Avenue in the City of Manassas, and Sudley Road in the City of Manassas and Prince William County.

SR 234 Business starts in the south as Dumfries Road as a four lane undivided highway. As it passes by the Prince William County fairgrounds before it enters the City of Manassas, it becomes two lanes. After entering the city, Dumfries Road passes by residential neighborhoods and becomes a four-lane divided road, and crosses Wellington Road. At Wellington Road SR 234 Business changes to Grant Avenue, which is a four lane undivided highway that passes by a townhouse development (Georgetown South) and retail developments before entering Old Town Manassas and crossing over SR 28. Shortly after this point Grant Avenue reduces to two lanes, then divides into a boulevard with spaces for on-street parking, and passes by homes, some of which are antebellum in architecture.

When Grant Avenue meets Sudley Road, SR 234 Business turns to the northwest along Sudley Road. This road is a four-lane divided highway that passes by the Manassas U.S. Post Office, the Prince William Hospital (part of the Novant Health System), the Manassas Mall, and several business establishments. SR 234 Business ends at the intersection with I-66, that also carries SR 234. SR 234 continues northward from there along Sudley Road.

SR 234 Business was first formed as part of SR 234. When the Prince William Parkway / Manassas Bypass was completed, it was numbered SR 234, and the section through Manassas was renamed SR 234 Business.

County	Location	mi	km	Destinations	Notes
Prince William		0.00	0.00	SR 234 (Prince William Parkway) – Dumfries, Manassas	Southern terminus
City of Manassas		2.53	4.07	Prince William Street – Manassas station, Manassas Museum	
City of Manassas		2.63– 2.68	4.23– 4.31	SR 28 (Center Street / Church Street) – Bristow, Centreville	One-way pair
City of Manassas		3.45	5.55	Sudley Road / Grant Avenue to SR 28 north	
City of Manassas		4.59	7.39	Godwin Drive – George Mason University-Prince William Science and Technology campus Campus	
Prince William		6.95	11.18	I-66 / SR 234 – Front Royal, Washington, D.C., Manassas National Battlefield Park, Northern Virginia Community College-Manassas	Northern terminus; exit 47 (I-66)
1.000 mi = 1.609 km; 1.000 km = 0.621 mi

< SR 708	District 7 State Routes; 1928–1933	SR 710 >
