= Innovation, Virginia =

Census-designated place in Virginia, US

- Census-designated place
- Location within Virginia Location within the United States
- Coordinates: 38°45′15″N 77°31′13″W
- Country: United States
- State: Virginia
- County: Prince William

Area
  - Total: 2.90 sq mi (7.52 km^{2})
  - Land: 2.89 sq mi (7.48 km^{2})
  - Water: 0.019 sq mi (0.05 km^{2})
- Elevation: 222 ft (68 m)

Population (2020)
  - Total: 926
- Time zone: UTC-5 (Eastern (EST))
  - Summer (DST): UTC-4 (EDT)
- ZIP Code: 20109, 20110 (Manassas)
- Area codes: 703, 571
- FIPS code: 51-39916
- GNIS feature ID: 2807436

Innovation is an unincorporated area and census-designated place (CDP) in Prince William County, Virginia, United States. As of the 2020 census, it had a population of 926.

The CDP is in the central part of the county, bordered to the southeast by the independent city of Manassas. It is bordered to the north by the Bull Run CDP, and to the west by the Linton Hall CDP.

Virginia State Route 234 (Prince William Parkway) runs through the center of the community, leading northwest 4 miles (6 km) to Interstate 66 near Gainesville and southeast 18 miles (29 km) to Interstate 95 at Dumfries. State Route 28 runs along the southern edge of the Innovation CDP, leading east into Manassas and southwest 18 miles (29 km) to U.S. Route 17 at Bealeton.

== Demographics ==
Innovation first appeared as a census designated place in the 2020 U.S. census.
