= Wellington Road (Manassas, Virginia) =

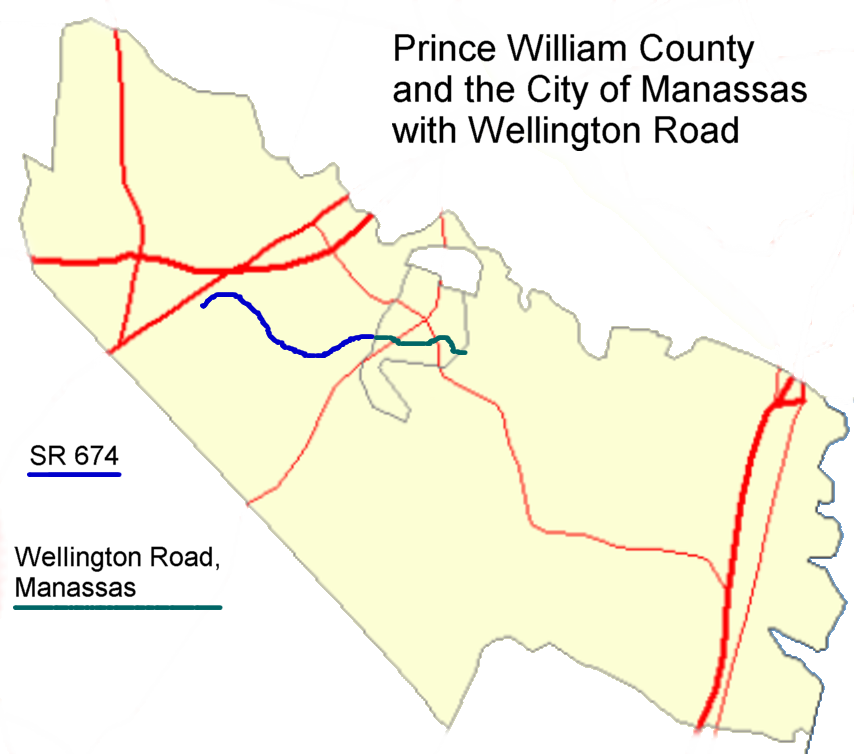
- Length: 3.80 mi (6.12 km)
- Location: Manassas, Virginia
- West end: SR 674 at the Prince William county line
- Major junctions: SR 28 in Manassas; SR 234 Bus. in Manassas
- East end: SR 294 (Prince William Parkway) in Manassas

Wellington Road in Manassas forms part of a major connector between eastern Prince William County and Gainesville. The main connecting route between these two communities is the Prince William Parkway with Interstate 66; however, Wellington Road provides a well-traveled backup route.

== Route description ==
Wellington Road begins in Manassas at the Prince William county line. Its first major intersection is SR 28, Nokesville Road to the south and Center Street to the north. Turning south on SR 28 will take the driver into Nokesville and Fauquier County. At this point Wellington Road widens into a four lane road.

VDOT has plans to create an interchange between Wellington Road and SR 28, mostly to grade-separate the crossing of SR 28 with nearby railroad tracks. This project was certified under the American Recovery and Reinvestment Act of 2009 on October 5, 2009, and the contract is expected to be let out in June 2010.

Shortly after Wellington Road crosses a total of 5 railroad tracks in two locations at-grade. The next major intersection is Clover Hill Road, which, to the south, intersects with SR 234 (Prince William Parkway) and continues into the Manassas Airport. The next major intersection is SR 234 Business, Grant Avenue to the north (leading to Manassas and I-66) and Dumfries Road to the south (leading toward SR 234, the Prince William Parkway, and eastern and southern Prince William County). Once past SR 234 Business, Wellington Road encounters Fairview Avenue as it makes a 90° turn to the southwest. Wellington Road ends at SR 294, the Prince William Parkway, and Liberia Road (Manassas, Virginia).

== History ==
Originally, Wellington Road in Manassas only ran from Godwin Drive to SR 234 Business. The remaining sections of the roadway were named Richmond Avenue and Fairview Avenue. A sharp curve in Wellington Avenue was straightened out, leaving behind Old Wellington Road. Richmond Avenue and Fairview Avenue crossed in a standard intersection, but the intersection was curved and only Fairview Avenue now intersects Wellington Road. In 2007, the Fairview Avenue portion of the route was renamed Wellington Road, and in 2008 the Richmond Avenue portion of the route was renamed Wellington Road.

== Major intersections ==
The entire route is in Manassas.

mi	km	Destinations	Notes
0.00	0.00	SR 674 (Wellington Road)	Continues as Wellington Road
0.78	1.26	SR 28 (Nokesville Road south, Center Street north) – Nokesville, Fauquier County, Manassas, Tysons Corner	Jughandle intersection
2.47	3.98	SR 234 Bus. (Dumfries Road south, Grant Avenue north) – Manassas, I-66, Catharpin	
3.80	6.12	SR 294 (Prince William Parkway) / Liberia Avenue – Manassas, Clifton, Woodbridge	
1.000 mi = 1.609 km; 1.000 km = 0.621 mi
