= Ben Sanders =

American baseball player (1865–1930)

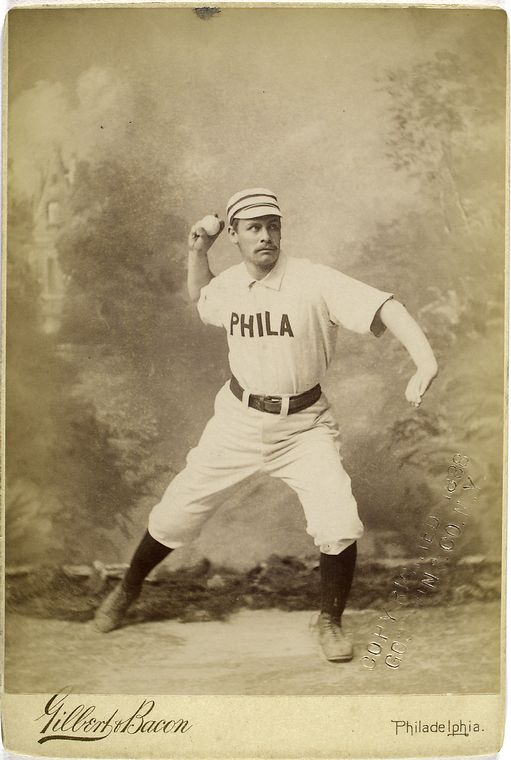
- 1888 baseball card of Sanders
- Pitcher
- Born: February 16, 1865; Catharpin, Virginia, U.S.
- Died: August 29, 1930 (aged 65); Memphis, Tennessee, U.S.
- Batted: Right Threw: Right

MLB debut
- June 6, 1888, for the Philadelphia Quakers

Last MLB appearance
- October 14, 1892, for the Louisville Colonels

MLB statistics
- Win–loss record: 80-70
- Earned run average: 3.24
- Strikeouts: 468
- Stats at Baseball Reference

Teams
- Philadelphia Quakers (1888–1889); Philadelphia Athletics (1890–1891); Louisville Colonels (1892)

Career highlights and awards
- Led the National League in shutouts in 1888; Pitched a no-hitter on August 22, 1892

Alexander Bennett "Ben" Sanders (February 16, 1865 – August 29, 1930) was an American Major League Baseball player who pitched a total of five seasons for three teams.

== Career ==
Born in Catharpin, Virginia, Sanders debuted on June 6, 1888 with the Philadelphia Quakers of the National League. As a pitcher, he displayed good control, but he used an unorthodox delivery which ended with him off-balance, and with his back turned toward home plate. This made it difficult for him to react quickly on batted balls in his area of responsibility, particularly bunts. On September 18 of that rookie season, Sanders lost a perfect game when his pitching opponent, Gus Krock, singled with one out in the 9th inning for the Chicago Colts. Sanders still achieved a 6–0 shutout victory.

He pitched two seasons for the Quakers, winning 38 games against 28 losses, including a rookie season in which he won 19 games, had a 1.90 earned run average, and led the league in shutouts with eight, and base on balls per 9 innings.

For the 1890 season, Ben jumped to the newly created Players' League, and won 19 games and lost 18 for the Philadelphia Athletics who later joined the American Association for the 1891 season. He finished his career with the Louisville Colonels of the National League, playing his final game on October 14, 1892. He had a record of 12–19, but on August 22, 1892, he pitched a no-hitter against the Baltimore Orioles, a 6–2 victory, the first no-hitter in the National League in which the losing team scored at least one run.

== Post-career ==
Sanders died in Memphis, Tennessee, at the age of 65, and is interred at Sudley United Methodist Church Cemetery in his hometown of Catharpin, Virginia.

== See also ==
- List of Major League Baseball annual shutout leaders
- List of Major League Baseball no-hitters

Achievements
Preceded by Jack Stivetts	No-hitter pitcher August 22, 1892	Succeeded by Bumpus Jones
