= Canova, Virginia =

Canova
- Unincorporated community
- Location within the state of Virginia Canova (Virginia) Canova (the United States)
- Coordinates: 38°40′37″N 77°26′31″W
- Country: United States
- State: Virginia
- County: Prince William
- Elevation: 358 ft (109 m)
- Time zone: UTC−5 (Eastern (EST))
  - Summer (DST): UTC−4 (EDT)

Canova is an unincorporated community in Prince William County, Virginia, United States. The community is located on Canova Drive, which is a former section of State Route 234 (Dumfries Road) and about 1.5 miles (2.4 km) north of Hoadly Road. The town consists of a church and multiple housing areas. There was once a country store and gas station, but after SR 234 (Dumfries Road) was realigned and widened in 2005, the road bypassed the town and forced it to close.
