= Ben Lomond Plantation =

Historic house in Virginia, United States

- Ben Lomond
- U.S. National Register of Historic Places
- Virginia Landmarks Register
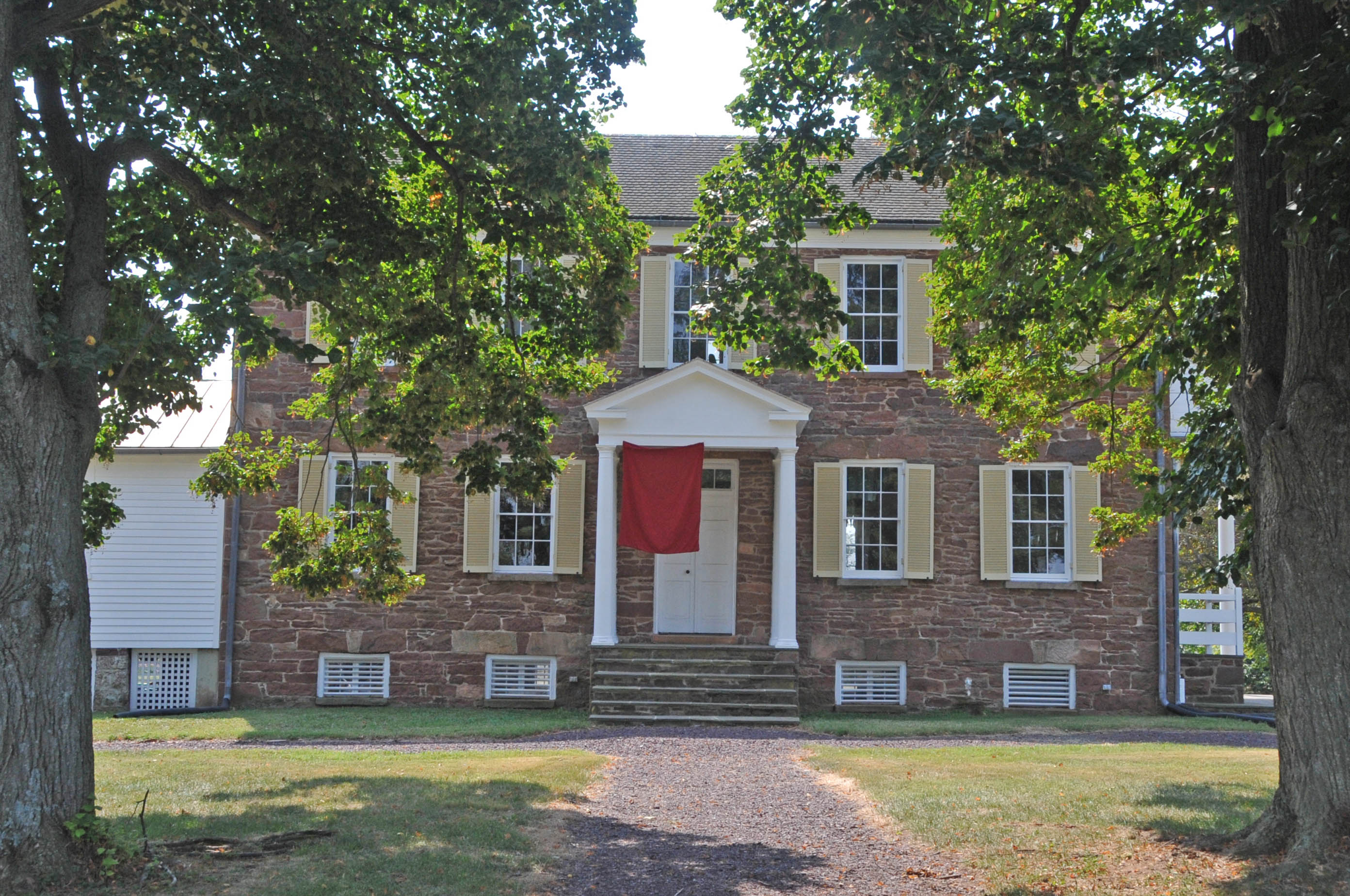
- Ben Lomond

- Location within Northern Virginia Location within Virginia Location within the United States
- Location: Northwest of Manassas at 10321 Sudley Manor Dr., Bull Run, Virginia
- Coordinates: 38°47′18″N 77°30′21″W
- Area: 4.5 acres (1.8 ha)
- Built: 1837
- NRHP reference No.: 80004214
- VLR No.: 076-0004

Significant dates
- Added to NRHP: July 30, 1980
- Designated VLR: May 20, 1980

Ben Lomond, also known as Ben Lomond Plantation, is a historic plantation house located at Bull Run, Prince William County, Virginia. It was built in 1837, and is a two-story, five-bay, red sandstone dwelling with a gable roof. The house has a central-hall plan and one-story frame kitchen addition. One-story pedimented porches shelter the main (north) and rear (south) entries. Also on the property are the contributing frame two-story tenant's house, brick pumphouse, and a bunkhouse dated to the early 20th century; and a meat house, dairy, and slave quarters dated to the late-1830s.

It was listed on the National Register of Historic Places in 1980.

The house is owned by the County and is open for tour as a Civil War-period historic house museum.
