= Manassas Mall =

- Location: Bull Run, Virginia, United States
- Coordinates: 38.7733°N 77.5054°W
- Address: 8300 Sudley Rd, Manassas, Virginia
- Opened: 1972
- Developer: Interstate Properties
- Manager: Spinoso Real Estate Group LLC
- Owner: Lionheart Capital LLC
- Num. of stores: 80+
- Num. of anchor tenants: 5 (4 open, 1 coming soon)
- Floor area: 824,893 sq ft (76,635.1 m^{2})
- Floors: 1

Manassas Mall is a shopping center located in Bull Run, Virginia (near Manassas). Built in 1972, it is owned by Lionheart Capital LLC and managed by Spinoso Real Estate Group. formerly by Vornado Realty Trust which shelved its regional mall holdings in 2014. The mall is anchored by Macy's, Walmart, and Floor & Decor, There is also a bowling alley and an indoor go-kart track. There has also been plans filed to turn the former At Home anchor store into an events center. The plans for this are currently pending.

== History ==
The mall was built by Interstate Properties, with Grant City and Montgomery Ward serving as the original anchors. Hecht's later took over the Grant's space. Leggett and Sears were added in the 1980s. At this point, the mall was opened by Interstate Properties.

As part of the Belk acquisition of Leggett, this location was liquidated in March 1997. J. C. Penney assumed the former Leggett location. Also that year, the Hecht's relocated to a new store, with Target Corporation building a new store on the former Hecht's site. After Montgomery Ward closed, Sears moved into the former Montgomery Ward building. Hecht's became Macy's in September 2006. Walmart would end up building a new Supercenter, in turn demolishing the west wing with the new Walmart opening up around 2010. On February 3, 2013, Target would end up closing due to underperforming in sales. In 2015, it was announced At Home would replace J C. Penney which would close.

In February 2020, Sears was permanently closed due to bankruptcy. In December 2023, Floor & Decor opened in a majority of the former Sears space. The former auto center remains vacant. On June 16, 2025, it was announced that At Home would be closing as part of a plan to close 26 stores nationwide, and the store closed on August 24, 2025.

In November, 2025, the owners of Manassas Mall submitted a plan to turn the former At Home store into an expo center. The current anchor space is of decent size to accommodate special events.
