= Prince William Parkway =

Road in Prince William County, Virginia, US

Route information
- Length: 24.39 mi (39.25 km) 8.32 mi (13.39 km) on SR 234; 16.07 mi (25.86 km) on SR 294
- Component highways: SR 234; SR 294

Major junctions
- West end: I-66 near Gainesville
- SR 28 in Manassas; SR 234 south / SR 649 in Brentsville; I-95 in Woodbridge
- East end: US 1 in Woodbridge

Location
- Country: United States
- State: Virginia
- Counties: Prince William

Highway system
- Virginia Routes; Interstate; US; Primary; Secondary; Byways; History; HOT lanes
← SR 293	→ I-295

The Prince William Parkway is a road in Prince William County, Virginia. The road carries two designations. Starting in the east at the intersection with U.S. Route 1 (US 1) in Woodbridge to the west until intersecting with Dumfries Road (Virginia State Route 234 or SR 234) south of Manassas, it carries State Route 294 (formerly SR 3000). At Dumfries Road, the Prince William Parkway assumes the SR 234 designation until ending at Interstate 66 (I-66) near Gainesville. Most of the route is a suburban at-grade expressway.

== History ==
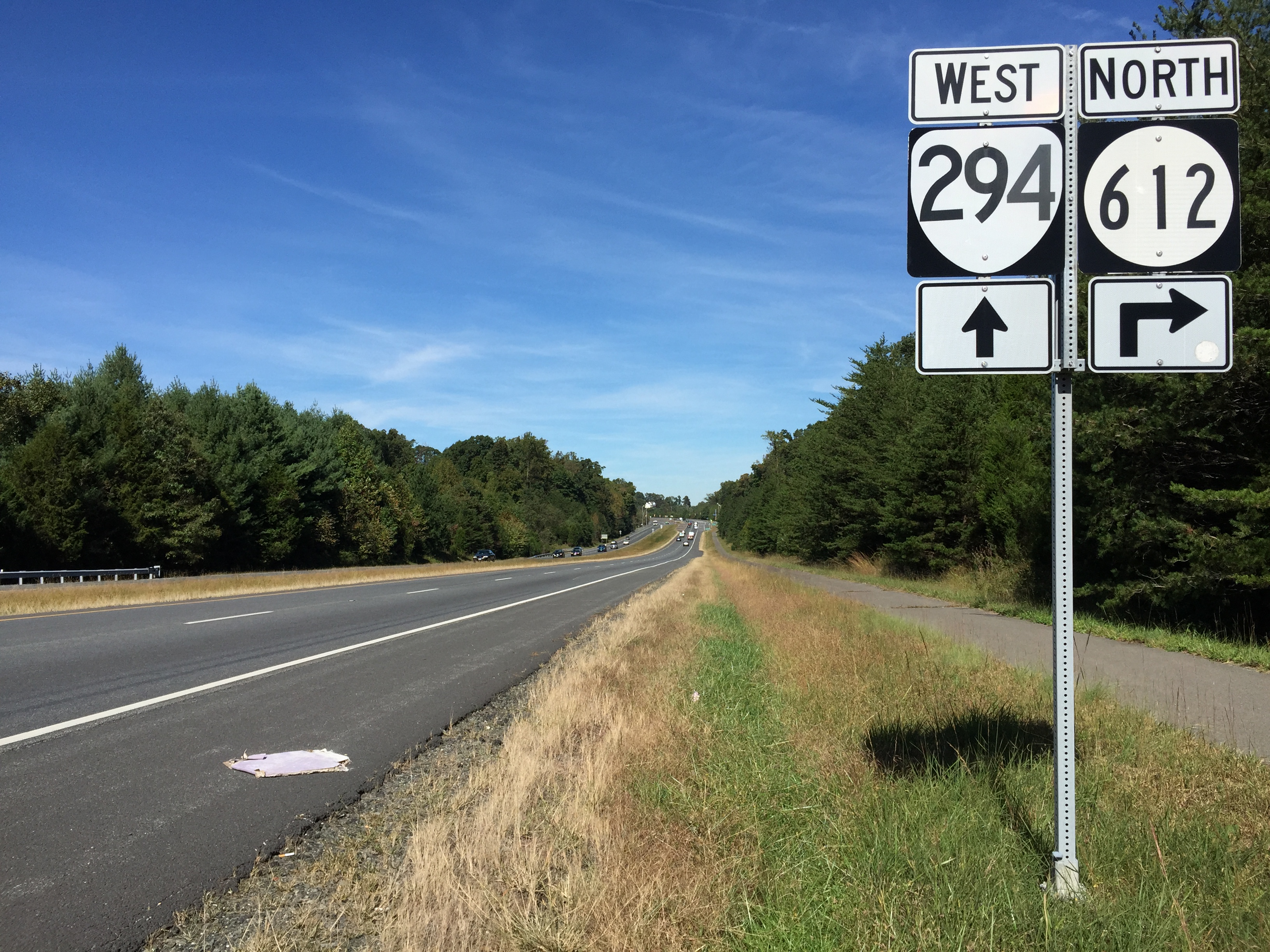
View west along SR 294 in Buckhall

SR 294 from I-95 to Dumfries Road was built by Prince William County in the mid-1990s. The SR 234 portion from Dumfries Road to I-66 was built by the Virginia Department of Transportation (VDOT) in late–1990s as a bypass of the old SR 234 through Manassas. The existing portion of SR 234 was renamed SR 234 Business. The last portion of the Prince William Parkway, an extension of SR 294 from I-95 to US 1, was built by Prince William County in 2005. On February 16, 2012, the former route designation for the Prince William Parkway, SR 3000, was changed to SR 294 by VDOT when the Commonwealth Transportation Board approved the transfer of the secondary road to a primary road for better maintenance of the parkway. Signage has been updated to reflect the new numbering along with "old SR 3000" signs.

== Honorary names ==
The SR 294 portion from I-95 to its intersection with Liberia Avenue and SR 663 (Wellington Road) has been designated the Kathleen K. Seefeldt Parkway for Kathleen Seefeldt, the former chairman of the Prince William Board of County Supervisors. The SR 234 portion from Dumfries Road to I-66 has been designated the Ronald Wilson Reagan Highway for Ronald Reagan.

== Future ==
=== SR 234 and Balls Ford Road interchange ===
As a part of the Transform 66 project, the current at-grade intersection of SR 234 and Balls Ford Road will be converted to a diverging diamond interchange at a cost of $167 million. As a part of this project, Balls Ford Road will be realigned about 0.50 miles (0.80 km) south, where the interchange will be constructed, and a new grade-separated bridge will be built over the Norfolk Southern Railroad Line. In addition, Balls Ford Road would be widened from a two lanes street to a four-lane divided roadway between its intersection at Devlin Road / Wellington Road through the interchange to Doane Drive. This project coincides with a separate project to widen Balls Ford Road between Doane Drive to Ashton Avenue. Construction is expected to begin in fall 2020 and be completed in late 2022.

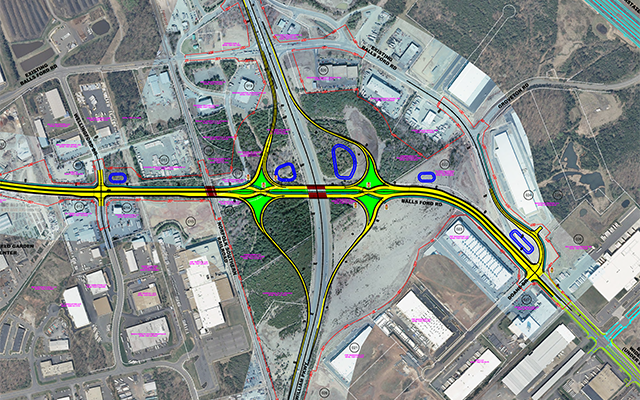
A rendering of the new intersection of SR 234 at Balls Ford Road.

=== SR 234 and University Boulevard intersection ===
A quadrant roadway intersection is planned at the intersection of SR 234 and University Boulevard in Manassas. Construction is expected to start in fall 2020 and be completed in fall 2022.

== Major intersections ==
County	Location	mi	km	Destinations	Notes
Prince William	Wellington	0.00	0.00	I-66 / SR 234 north – Front Royal, Washington, DC	Northwestern terminus of Prince William Parkway; northern end of concurrency with SR 234
Prince William	Wellington	0.60	0.97	SR 621 (Balls Ford Road) to SR 234 Bus.	Interchange
Prince William		2.82	4.54	SR 674 (Wellington Road)	
Prince William		3.72	5.99	SR 840 (University Boulevard) – George Mason University-Prince William Science and Technology campus Campus	
City of Manassas		4.73	7.61	SR 28 (Nokesville Road) to US 17 – Manassas	Interchange
Prince William	Brentsville	6.50	10.46	Clover Hill Road – Manassas Regional Airport	
Prince William	Brentsville	8.19	13.18	SR 234 Bus. north – Manassas, Novant Health UVA Health System Prince William Medical Center	Southern terminus of SR 234 Business
Prince William	Brentsville	8.32	13.39	SR 234 south (Dumfries Road) / SR 294 begins / SR 649 west (Brentsville Road) to I-95 – Dumfries	Southern end of concurrency with SR 234; western end of concurrency with SR 294; western terminus of SR 294
Prince William	Brentsville	8.32 0.00	13.39 0.00	Prince William Parkway transitions from SR 234 to SR 294	
City of Manassas		2.02	3.25	SR 663 west (Wellington Road) to SR 234 Bus. north Liberia Road to I-66 east / SR 28	Eastern terminus of SR 663
Prince William	Brentsville	3.81	6.13	SR 612 (Yates Ford Road) – Clifton	
Prince William	Dale City	10.55	16.98	SR 641 north (Old Bridge Road) / Touchstone Circle – Lake Ridge	Southern terminus of SR 641
Prince William		13.47	21.68	Smoketown Road – Sentara Northern Virginia Medical Center	
Prince William		13.90	22.37	Worth Avenue – Potomac Mills	
Prince William		14.15	22.77	Telegraph Road to SR 849 (Caton Hill Road)	
Prince William		14.50	23.34	SR 849 west (Caton Hill Road)	Interchange; westbound exit and eastbound entrance; eastern terminus of SR 849
Prince William	Woodbridge	14.92	24.01	I-95 / I-95 Express north – Washington, Richmond	Exit 158 (I-95)
Prince William	Woodbridge	16.07	25.86	US 1 (Richmond Highway) to I-95 / East Longview Drive – Dumfries, Lorton	Southeastern terminus; eastern end of concurrency with SR 294; eastern terminus of SR 294
1.000 mi = 1.609 km; 1.000 km = 0.621 mi: Concurrency terminus; Incomplete access; Route transition; Unopened
