= Hoadly, Virginia =

Unincorporated community in Virginia, US

Coordinates: 38°40′49″N 77°21′33″W

Hoadly is an unincorporated community in Prince William County, in the U.S. state of Virginia.
