= Broad Run station =

VRE station in Prince William County, Virginia

Broad Run–Airport
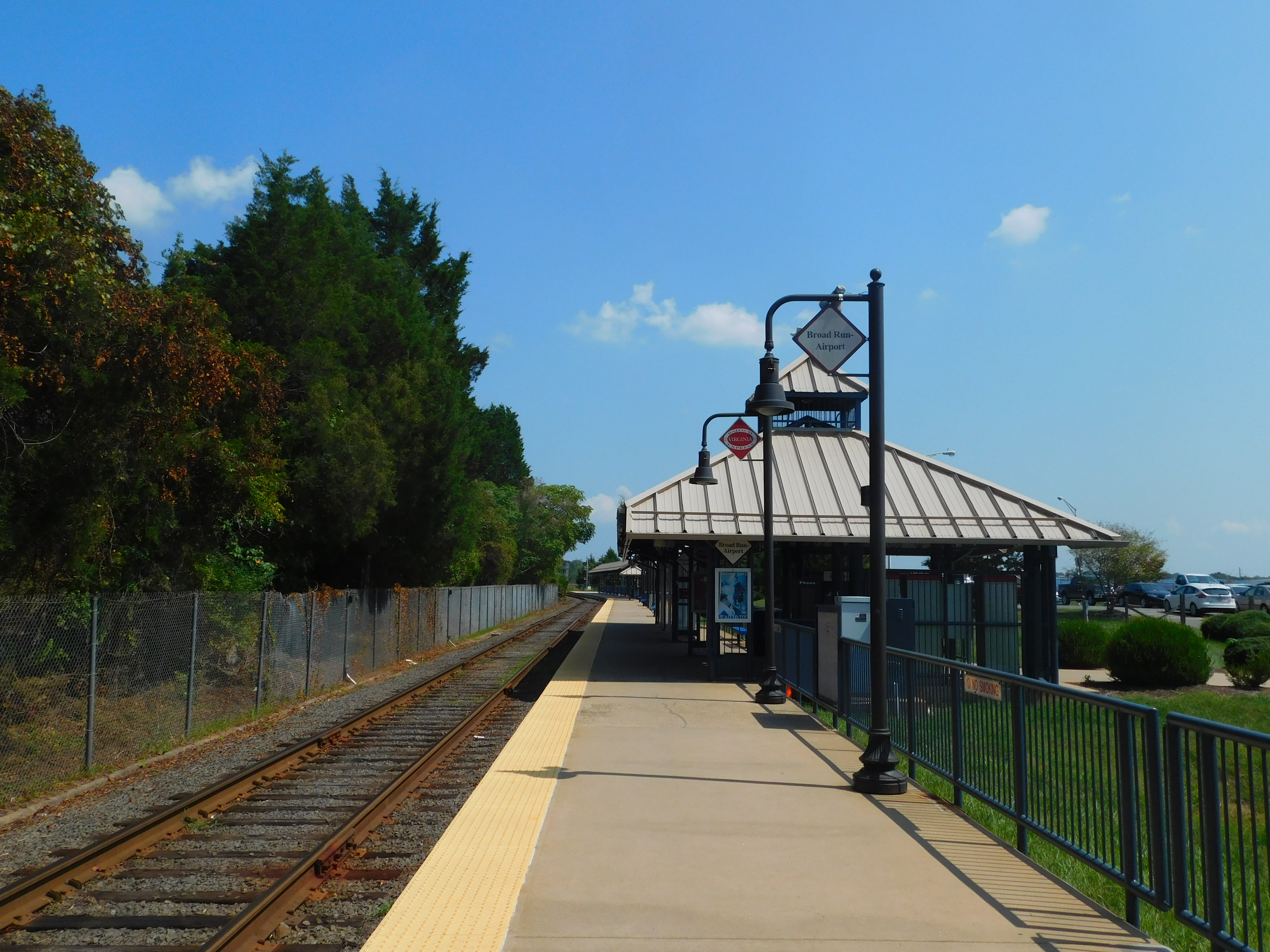
- Broad Run station in August 2018

General information
- Location: 10637 Piper Lane; Bristow, Virginia; United States
- Coordinates: 38°43′46″N 77°31′33″W
- Platforms: 1 side platform
- Tracks: 1

Construction
- Parking: 885 parking spaces
- Cycle facilities: Yes
- Accessible: Yes

Other information
- Fare zone: 6

History
- Opened: 1992

Passengers
- 2012: 1,290 daily boardings

Services
Preceding station	Virginia Railway Express	Following station
Terminus	Manassas Line	Manassas toward Union Station
Location

Broad Run station is the terminal station for the Virginia Railway Express Manassas Line. It is located at 10637 Piper Lane in the Bristow section of unincorporated Prince William County, Virginia, United States, adjacent to Manassas Regional Airport. It has parking for 885 cars. The station is located on a siding that leads off the two-track main line. The siding continues to a layover yard.

Amtrak's Cardinal, Crescent and Northeast Regional pass next to the station, but do not stop.

The station opened in 1992 with the inauguration of the line. On March 17, 2017, the VRE Operations Board voted to expand the Broad Run station instead of an extension to Haymarket. This might include relocating the station, as well as expanding the rail yard and parking facilities. The expansion proposition had been shelved due to cost.
