= Catharpin, Virginia =

Catharpin
- Unincorporated community
- Location within the state of Virginia Catharpin (Virginia) Catharpin (the United States)
- Coordinates: 38°51′15″N 77°34′19″W
- Country: United States
- State: Virginia
- County: Prince William
- Time zone: UTC−5 (Eastern (EST))
  - Summer (DST): UTC−4 (EDT)

Catharpin is a hamlet in Prince William County, Virginia, United States. Catharpin lies on State Route 234 to the northwest of Manassas National Battlefield Park.

== Geography ==
Catharpin is characterized by rolling fields, wide meadows, and gravel/dirt roads, and many of the rural folk capitalize on the abundant land and have farms with livestock. It is not uncommon to see horses roaming on 50 acres (200,000 m^{2}) of land.

== Notable people ==
- Jennie Dean (1848–1913), African American educator and missionary
- Ben Sanders (1865–1930), former MLB pitcher for the Philadelphia Phillies, Philadelphia Athletics, and Louisville Colonels
