= Buckhall, Virginia =

Census-designated place in Virginia, US

- Census-designated place
- Location in Prince William County and the state of Virginia.
- Coordinates: 38°43′N 77°26′W
- Country: United States
- State: Virginia
- County: Prince William

Population (2020)
  - Total: 20,420
- Time zone: UTC−5 (Eastern (EST))
  - Summer (DST): UTC−4 (EDT)
- ZIP code: 20111-12
- GNIS feature ID: 2629765

Buckhall is an unincorporated community in the census-designated place (CDP) of the same name, in Prince William County, Virginia, United States. Its population was 20,420 as of the 2020 Census.

== Demographics ==
Historical population
Census	Pop.	Note	%±
2020	20,420		—
U.S. Decennial Census; 2000 2010

Buckhall was first listed as a census designated place in the 2010 U.S. census.

=== 2020 census ===
As of the 2020 census, Buckhall had a population of 20,420. The median age was 38.9 years. 24.3% of residents were under the age of 18 and 12.3% of residents were 65 years of age or older. For every 100 females there were 97.2 males, and for every 100 females age 18 and over there were 96.1 males age 18 and over.

93.7% of residents lived in urban areas, while 6.3% lived in rural areas.

There were 6,395 households in Buckhall, of which 40.1% had children under the age of 18 living in them. Of all households, 69.8% were married-couple households, 11.7% were households with a male householder and no spouse or partner present, and 14.4% were households with a female householder and no spouse or partner present. About 12.7% of all households were made up of individuals and 5.1% had someone living alone who was 65 years of age or older.

There were 6,587 housing units, of which 2.9% were vacant. The homeowner vacancy rate was 0.9% and the rental vacancy rate was 4.2%.

Racial composition as of the 2020 census
Race	Number	Percent
White	12,089	59.2%
Black or African American	2,142	10.5%
American Indian and Alaska Native	128	0.6%
Asian	2,128	10.4%
Native Hawaiian and Other Pacific Islander	19	0.1%
Some other race	1,384	6.8%
Two or more races	2,530	12.4%
Hispanic or Latino (of any race)	3,195	15.6%

== Origins ==
It is where the remnants of the original small town are now, that Buckhall School (formerly Oak Hill School) a one-room school house, was built in 1865, around which the village then grew up.

The Buckhall Church (now Buckhall United Methodist Church) was built (ca. 1905) nearby, beside what is now Prince William Parkway, and still stands as of 2015. An addition was added onto the original church in 1988, and an even larger addition was completed in April 2007, while still preserving and retaining the older, historic Civil War era church building structure.

== Buckhall Fire Dept. ==
The Buckhall Volunteer Fire Department (County Fire Station #516) is located on Yates Ford Drive just off the Prince William Parkway.

== Major highways ==
- SR 234 (Dumfries Road)

- connects to Interstate 66, and (Lee Highway) nine miles north of Buckhall.

- SR 294 (Prince William County Parkway)

- connects to Virginia State Route 28 (Centerville Road) one mile north of Buckhall, and to Interstate 95, eleven miles south of Buckhall.
