= Loch Lomond, Virginia =

- Census-designated place (CDP)
- Location in Prince William County and the state of Virginia.
- Coordinates: 38°46′50″N 77°28′56″W
- Country: United States
- State: Virginia
- County: Prince William

Area
  - Total: 0.73 sq mi (1.9 km^{2})
  - Land: 0.73 sq mi (1.9 km^{2})
  - Water: 0 sq mi (0.0 km^{2})
- Elevation: 190 ft (58 m)

Population (2010)
  - Total: 3,701
  - Density: 5,000/sq mi (1,900/km^{2})
- Time zone: UTC−5 (Eastern (EST))
  - Summer (DST): UTC−4 (EDT)
- FIPS code: 51-46328
- GNIS feature ID: 1760938

Loch Lomond is a census-designated place (CDP) in Prince William County, Virginia, United States. As of the 2020 census, Loch Lomond had a population of 4,050. It is named after a loch in northern Scotland, Loch Lomond.

== Geography ==
Loch Lomond is located at 38°46′50″N 77°28′56″W (38.780614, −77.482188).

According to the United States Census Bureau, the CDP has a total area of 0.7 square mile (1.9 km^{2}), all land.

== Demographics ==
=== 2020 census ===
As of the 2020 census, Loch Lomond had a population of 4,050. The median age was 34.9 years. 26.3% of residents were under the age of 18 and 10.4% of residents were 65 years of age or older. For every 100 females there were 109.2 males, and for every 100 females age 18 and over there were 110.3 males age 18 and over.

100.0% of residents lived in urban areas, while 0.0% lived in rural areas.

There were 1,058 households in Loch Lomond, of which 44.5% had children under the age of 18 living in them. Of all households, 57.8% were married-couple households, 17.3% were households with a male householder and no spouse or partner present, and 20.5% were households with a female householder and no spouse or partner present. About 14.6% of all households were made up of individuals and 5.5% had someone living alone who was 65 years of age or older.

There were 1,083 housing units, of which 2.3% were vacant. The homeowner vacancy rate was 0.8% and the rental vacancy rate was 3.6%.

Racial composition as of the 2020 census
Race	Number	Percent
White	1,463	36.1%
Black or African American	184	4.5%
American Indian and Alaska Native	58	1.4%
Asian	166	4.1%
Native Hawaiian and Other Pacific Islander	4	0.1%
Some other race	1,648	40.7%
Two or more races	527	13.0%
Hispanic or Latino (of any race)	2,393	59.1%

=== 2000 census ===
As of the 2000 census, there were 3,411 people, 1,048 households, and 865 families residing in the CDP. The population density was 4,668.9 inhabitants per square mile (1,802.7/km^{2}). There were 1,063 housing units at an average density of 1,455.0 per square mile (561.8/km^{2}). The racial makeup of the CDP was 79.39% White, 7.01% African American, 0.26% Native American, 2.11% Asian, 0.06% Pacific Islander, 8.88% from other races, and 2.29% from two or more races. Hispanic or Latino of any race were 14.10% of the population.

There were 1,048 households, out of which 40.4% had children under the age of 18 living with them, 69.6% were married couples living together, 8.2% had a female householder with no husband present, and 17.4% were non-families. 13.1% of all households were made up of individuals, and 3.9% had someone living alone who was 65 years of age or older. The average household size was 3.25 and the average family size was 3.51.

In the CDP, the population was spread out, with 29.3% under the age of 18, 7.6% from 18 to 24, 31.5% from 25 to 44, 23.9% from 45 to 64, and 7.6% who were 65 years of age or older. The median age was 35 years. For every 100 females, there were 106.9 males. For every 100 females age 18 and over, there were 104.1 males.

The median income for a household in the CDP was $69,674, and the median income for a family was $70,970. Males had a median income of $40,177 versus $34,402 for females. The per capita income for the CDP was $21,604. About 6.2% of families and 7.3% of the population were below the poverty line, including 11.5% of those under age 18 and none of those age 65 or over.

The residents of Loch Lomond are represented in the Virginia House of Delegates by Danica Roem.
