= Washington Manassas Airport =

Airport in Virginia, United States

Washington Manassas Airport Harry P. Davis Field
- Logo in use since August 2026.

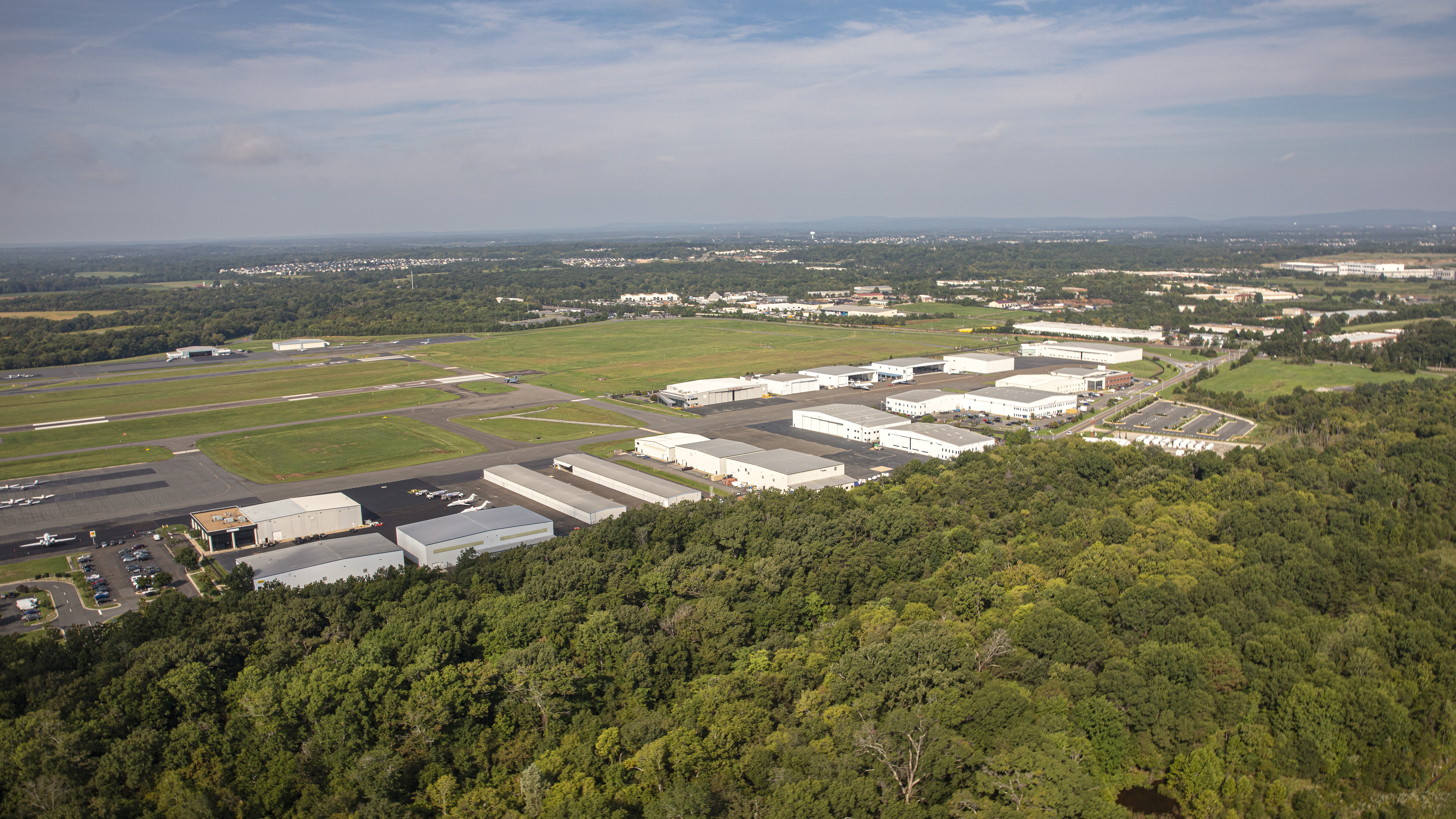
- HEF airfield in 2021.
- IATA: MNZ; ICAO: KHEF; FAA LID: HEF

Summary
- Airport type: Public
- Owner: City of Manassas
- Serves: Washington, D.C. metropolitan area
- Location: Manassas, Virginia, U.S.
- Opened: 1964 (current facility); 1931
- Time zone: EST (UTC−05:00)
  - Summer (DST): EDT (UTC−04:00)
- Elevation AMSL: 192 ft (59 m)
- Coordinates: 38°43′17″N 077°30′56″W
- Public transit access: Virginia Railway Express: Broad Run–Airport station
- Website: https://flyhef.com

Map
- Location within Virginia Location within the United States

Runways
Direction	Length		Surface
Direction	ft	m	Surface
16L/34R	6,200	1,890	Asphalt
16R/34L	3,715	1,132	Asphalt

Statistics (2023)
- Aircraft operations: 102,414
- Based aircraft: 417
- Source: Federal Aviation Administration

Washington Manassas Airport (IATA: MNZ, ICAO: KHEF, FAA LID: HEF) – formerly named Manassas Regional Airport and also known as Harry P. Davis Field – is a public airport located in Manassas, Virginia, 40 miles (64 km) west-southwest of Washington, D.C. The airport is undergoing major reconstruction, and is slated to begin commercial passenger flight operations in Spring 2027 as the fourth commercial airport servicing the Washington Metropolitan area.

Virginia’s largest general aviation airport, HEF serves law enforcement, military, and medivac aircraft and numerous flight schools. In the National Plan of Integrated Airport Systems, HEF is a reliever airport for the much larger Dulles International Airport (IAD) located 15 miles (24 km) to its north, as well as Ronald Reagan Washington National Airport (DCA). All lie within the heavily controlled Washington, D.C., Special Flight Rules Area.

== History ==
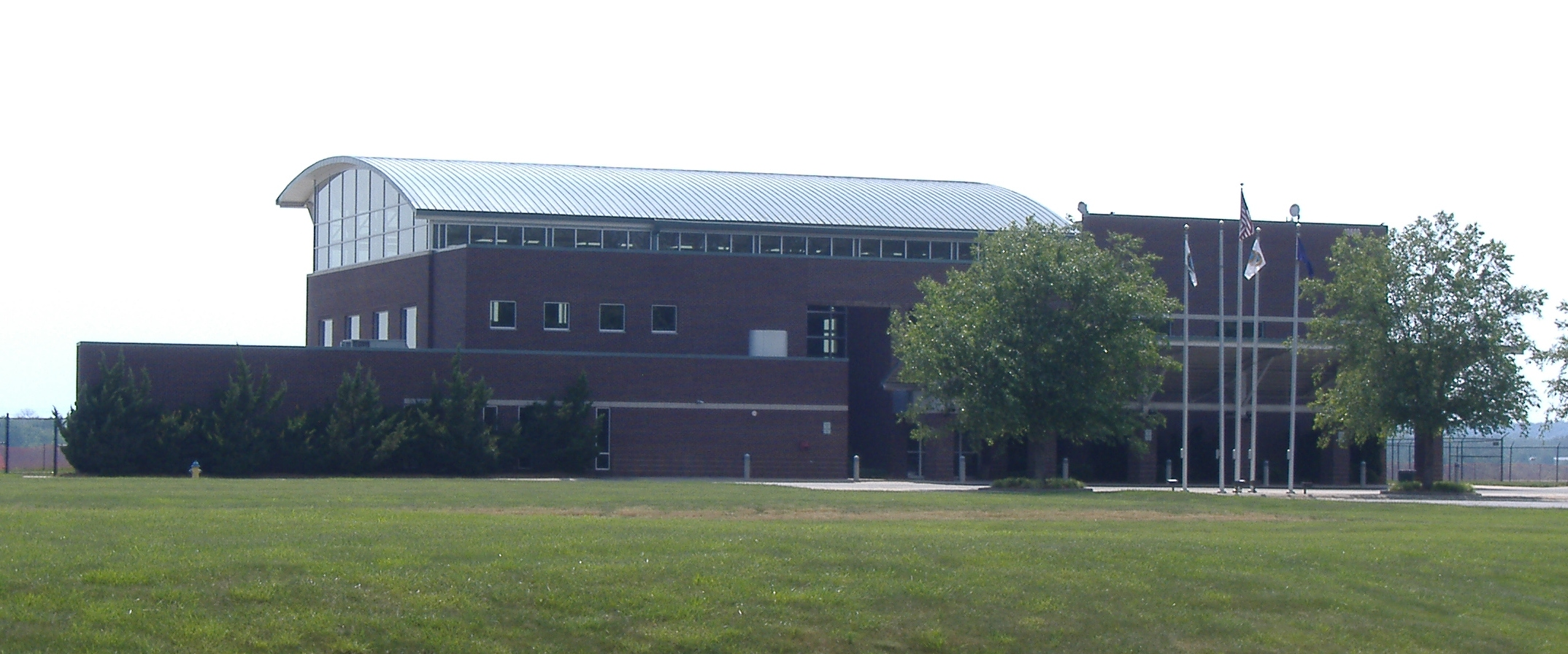
The HEF terminal building before renovations.

An airport for Manassas was proposed in 1930, when the mayor was Harry P. Davis. It was built in 1931 on 94 acres (0.38 km^{2}) along Virginia Route 234, in the area now known as Manaport Shopping Center. Originally owned privately, the Town of Manassas bought the airport in 1945. Resulting from the impact of airport activity on nearby housing development, the airport opened in its current location in December 1964. The new airport opened with a single 3,700-by-100-foot (1,128 m × 30 m) paved runway. The airport's IATA code was changed from WOU to the current MNZ between mid-1976 and mid-1977. In 1992, a 70-foot (21 m) air traffic control tower was disassembled at Centennial Airport near Denver, sent to Manassas, and reassembled in Manassas, where it continues to stand today. A new terminal was built in 1996.

The airport saw commercial airline service by Colgan Airways in the 1970s and 1980s with flights to Washington Dulles International Airport and continuing onto Binghamton, NY. Colgan was based at the Manassas airport and flew Beechcraft 99 and Beechcraft 1900 commuter aircraft. From late 1985 through early 1987 Colgan teamed up with New York Air and was known as New York Air Connection providing feeder flights for the larger carrier. In early 1987 New York Air merged into Continental Airlines and Colgan operated as a Continental Express feeder carrier, with service to Manassas ending soon after. Colgan returned to Manassas in the mid-1990s operating under their own brand and providing flights to Washington Dulles. Its discontinuance marked the end of the airport's commercial passenger operations.

=== Washington Manassas Airport ===
In June 2023, the City of Manassas received a proposal from airport operator Avports to relaunch commercial passenger flights, with interest from multiple airlines. The City Council approved the proposal unanimously on July 24, 2023, and stated that they expected commercial operations to resume in two years.

On May 12, 2026, the FAA approved the city's renaming of Manassas Regional Airport to Washington Manassas Airport, a change reportedly sought by commercial airlines for search engine optimization. The airport immediately publicly rebranded. Soon after, the airport announced it had allocated $38 million for the purchase of a new control tower. A $50 million project to expand and renovate the passenger terminal and add additional gates, jetways, and parking is underway. The Federal Aviation Administration formally granted a Part 139 Commercial Airport Operating Certificate on August 31, 2026. On October 20, 2026, Manassas broke ground on a 145-foot (44 m) air traffic control tower. The Federal Aviation Administration is funding $26 million, the Commonwealth of Virginia is contributing $1 million, and the City of Manassas is covering $14 million. The control tower is expected to take two years to build. Commercial flights are targeted to begin at the end of 2027.

== Facilities ==
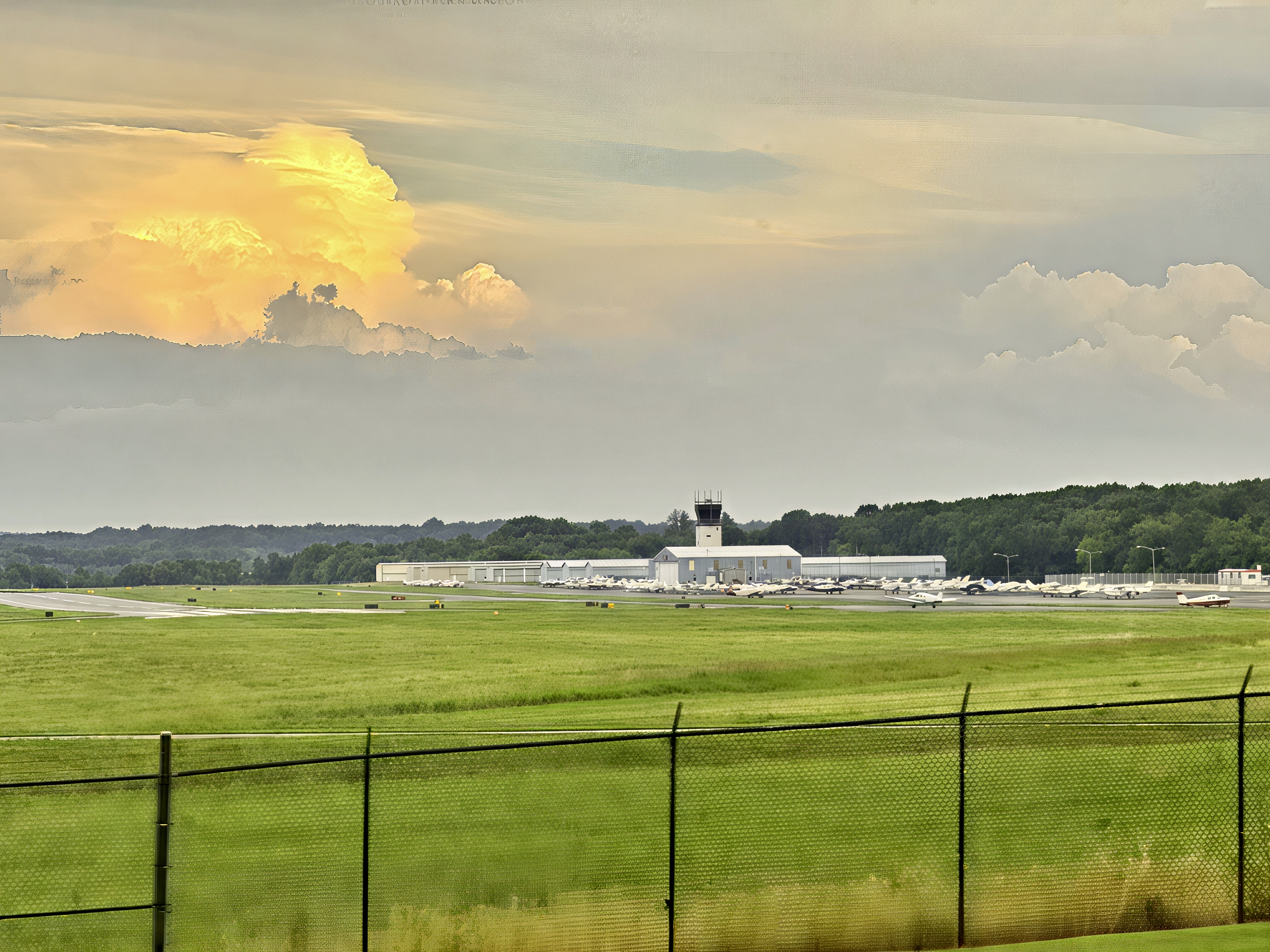
Hangars and control tower at Manassas Regional Airport

The airport covers 888 acres (359 ha) at an elevation of 192 feet (59 m). It has two asphalt runways: 16L/34R is 6,200 x 100 feet (1,737 x 30 m) and 16R/34L is 3,715 x 75 feet (1,132 x 29 m).

In the year ending December 31, 2021 the airport had 87,900 aircraft operations, average 241 per day: 98% general aviation, 1% air taxi and 1% military. 374 aircraft were then based at this airport: 287 single-engine aircraft, 46 multi-engine aircraft, 24 jets, and 17 helicopters.

Manassas houses 26 businesses operating onsite ranging from airframe, powerplant, and avionics maintenance, as well as flight schools and aircraft charter. APP Jet Center and Chantilly Air are the airport's two fixed base operators (FBOs) with Chantilly Air opening in March, 2021. Dulles Aviation had previously run the first FBO at the airport from the 1980s until closing its doors in May 2019 and was responsible for a lot of the airport's growth.

One operator at the airport is Quest Diagnostics, who operate PC-12s and TBM 700s at the airfield. Quest Diagnostics specialize in transporting medical samples and tests across the US. They grew massively during the COVID-19 pandemic as the need for rapid transportation of tests and specimens grew exponentially.

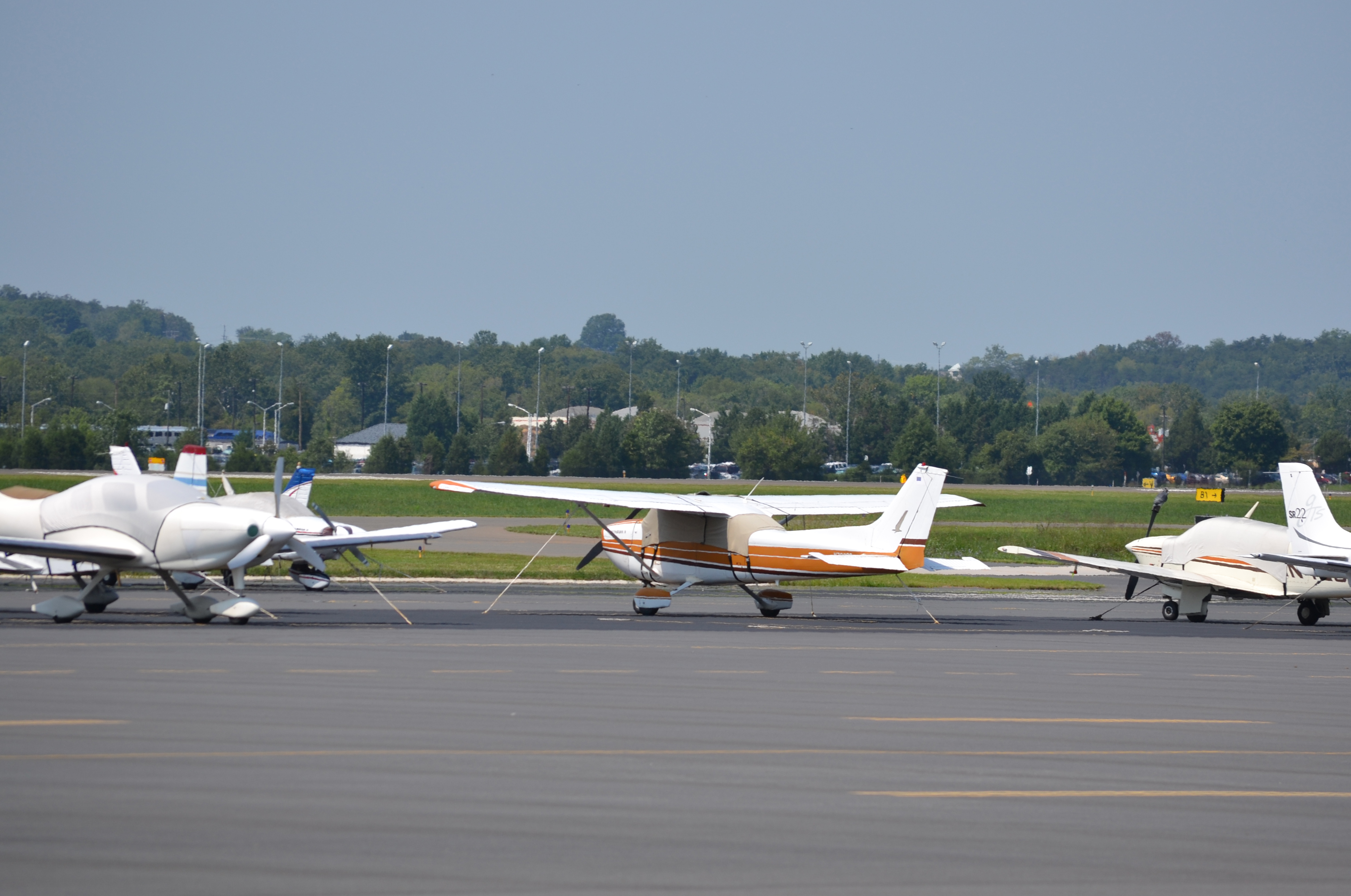
Small planes at Manassas Regional Airport

== See also ==
- Broad Run/Airport (VRE station)
- Colgan Air (formerly headquartered on airport grounds)
- City of Manassas
