= Linton Hall, Virginia =

- Census-designated place (CDP)
- Location in Prince William County and the state of Virginia.
- Coordinates: 38°45′15″N 77°34′50″W
- Country: United States
- State: Virginia
- County: Prince William

Area
  - Total: 8.3 sq mi (21.4 km^{2})
  - Land: 8.3 sq mi (21.4 km^{2})
  - Water: 0 sq mi (0.0 km^{2})
- Elevation: 246 ft (75 m)

Population (2020)
  - Total: 41,754
  - Density: 5,050/sq mi (1,950/km^{2})
- Time zone: UTC−5 (Eastern (EST))
  - Summer (DST): UTC−4 (EDT)
- Area codes: 571, 703
- FIPS code: 51-45957
- GNIS feature ID: 1852916

Linton Hall is a census-designated place (CDP) in Prince William County, Virginia, United States, which includes unincorporated Bristow. As of the 2020 census, Linton Hall had a population of 41,754.

According to the United States Census Bureau, residents of Linton Hall had an average commute of 46.3 minutes each way between 2005 and 2007, the longest average commute for the period in the nation. The average commute in the United States for the period was 25.1 minutes. The chairman of the Prince William Board of County Supervisors said commutes were especially long for residents during the period studied because the county had not finished building roads to support the new residential areas that had just been built.

== History ==
The area is named for Linton Hall Military School (now Linton Hall School), a school founded by Benedictine nuns on the site of the former Linton's Ford Plantation. Linton's Ford was inherited by Sister Mary Baptista, John Linton's daughter, and upon her death the land was inherited by the Benedictine order for the purpose of educating poor boys and girls. The Benedictine monastery remains part of the school through the present day.

Over the last century the Benedictine nuns sold most of the school property, primarily to real estate developers, which created the Braemar subdivision, a series of upscale housing developments with a large homeowners association.

The Linton family cemetery is located inside the Braemar subdivision. The site was surveyed by the Prince William County Archaeologist, Prince William County Historical Society and County Arborist for potential restoration in 2006. While it was the intent of the nuns at Linton Hall to maintain ownership of the cemetery, it was determined that, due to loss of land records for that space during the Civil War (attributed to the burning of the Brentsville Courthouse), the cemetery was "unowned" and remains in this status today.

== Geography ==
Linton Hall is located at 38°45′15″N 77°34′50″W (38.754262, −77.580487).

According to the United States Census Bureau, the CDP has a total area of 8.3 square miles (21.4 km^{2}), all land.

== Demographics ==
Historical population
Census	Pop.	Note	%±
2000	8,620		—
2020	41,754		—
U.S. Decennial Census; 2000 2010 2020

Linton Hall was first listed as a census designated place in the 2000 U.S. census.

=== 2020 census ===
As of the 2020 census, Linton Hall had a population of 41,754. The median age was 35.1 years. 30.8% of residents were under the age of 18 and 6.4% of residents were 65 years of age or older. For every 100 females there were 99.4 males, and for every 100 females age 18 and over there were 95.2 males age 18 and over.

99.5% of residents lived in urban areas, while 0.5% lived in rural areas.

There were 12,139 households in Linton Hall, of which 55.1% had children under the age of 18 living in them. Of all households, 72.2% were married-couple households, 9.1% were households with a male householder and no spouse or partner present, and 15.1% were households with a female householder and no spouse or partner present. About 10.8% of all households were made up of individuals and 2.8% had someone living alone who was 65 years of age or older.

There were 12,343 housing units, of which 1.7% were vacant. The homeowner vacancy rate was 0.2% and the rental vacancy rate was 6.1%.

Racial composition as of the 2020 census
Race	Number	Percent
White	23,483	56.2%
Black or African American	5,024	12.0%
American Indian and Alaska Native	147	0.4%
Asian	5,716	13.7%
Native Hawaiian and Other Pacific Islander	44	0.1%
Some other race	2,059	4.9%
Two or more races	5,281	12.6%
Hispanic or Latino (of any race)	5,740	13.7%

=== 2000 census ===
As of the census of 2000, there were 8,620 people, 2,733 households, and 2,347 families residing in the CDP. The population density was 1,043.0 inhabitants per square mile (402.7/km^{2}). There were 2,851 housing units at an average density of 345.0 per square mile (133.2/km^{2}). The racial makeup of the CDP was 87.55% White, 6.69% African American, 0.19% Native American, 2.65% Asian, 0.13% Pacific Islander, 1.08% from other races, and 1.72% from two or more races. Hispanic or Latino of any race were 3.98% of the population.

There were 2,733 households, out of which 57.3% had children under the age of 18 living with them, 78.7% were married couples living together, 5.0% had a female householder with no husband present, and 14.1% were non-families. 9.1% of all households were made up of individuals, and 0.4% had someone living alone who was 65 years of age or older. The average household size was 3.12 and the average family size was 3.34.

In the CDP, the population was spread out, with 35.4% under the age of 18, 4.4% from 18 to 24, 46.3% from 25 to 44, 12.1% from 45 to 64, and 1.8% who were 65 years of age or older. The median age was 30 years. For every 100 females, there were 99.0 males. For every 100 females age 18 and over, there were 96.1 males.

=== 2007 estimate ===
According to a 2007 estimate, the median income for a household in the CDP was $115,581, and the median income for a family was $122,487. Males had a median income of $56,073 versus $38,771 for females. The per capita income for the CDP was $30,804. About 1.9% of families and 2.8% of the population were below the poverty line, including 2.0% of those under age 18 and 18.0% of those age 65 or over.
