= Bull Run, Prince William County, Virginia =

Census-designated place in Virginia, US

Bull Run, Virginia
- Census-designated place (CDP)
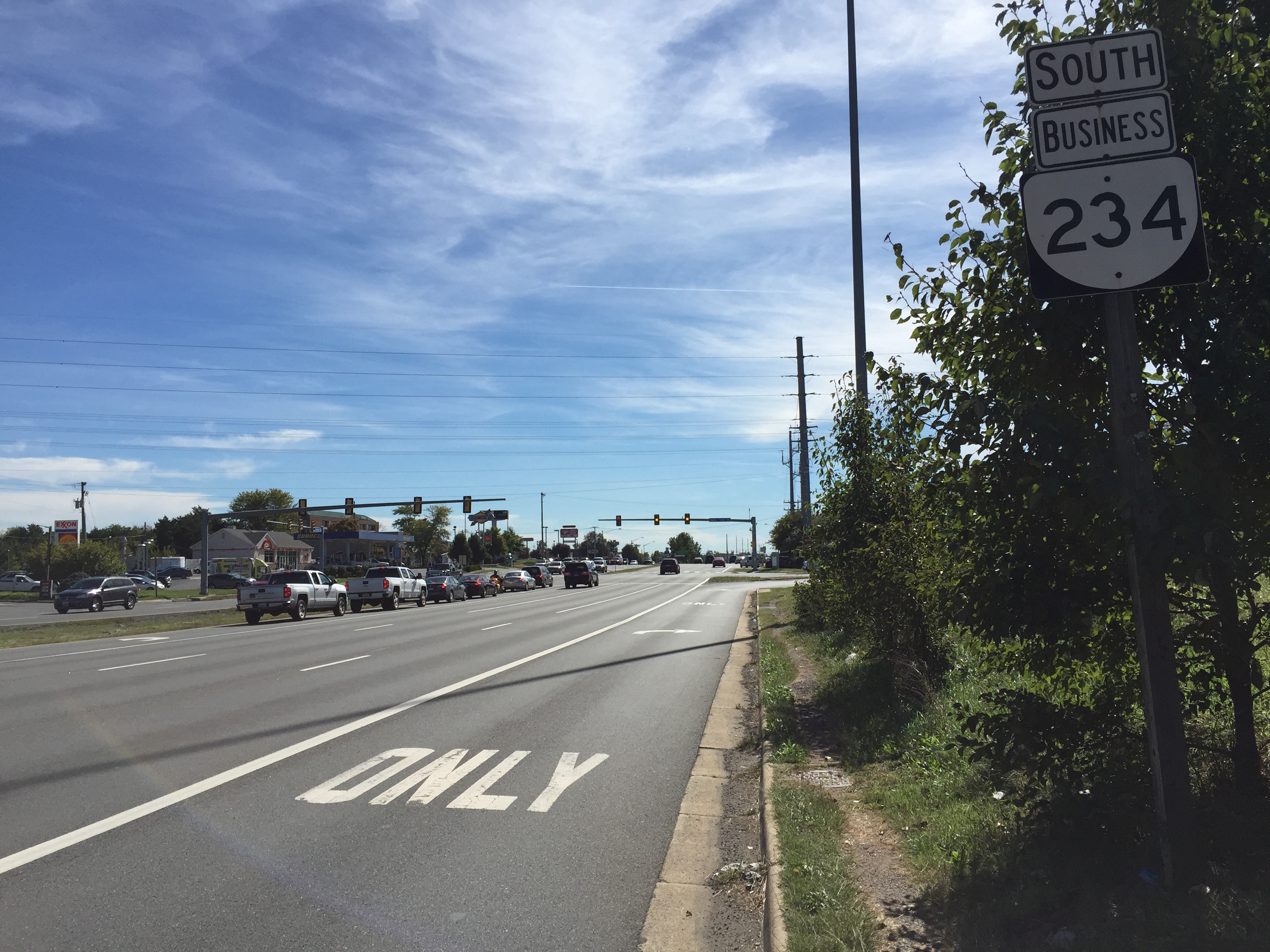
- Sudley Road in Bull Run

- Location in Prince William County and the state of Virginia.
- Coordinates: 38°47′6″N 77°31′25″W
- Country: United States
- State: Virginia
- County: Prince William

Area
  - Total: 2.7 sq mi (6.9 km^{2})
  - Land: 2.7 sq mi (6.9 km^{2})
  - Water: 0 sq mi (0.0 km^{2})
- Elevation: 285 ft (87 m)

Population (2010)
  - Total: 14,983
  - Density: 4,238/sq mi (1,636.2/km^{2})
- Time zone: UTC−5 (Eastern (EST))
  - Summer (DST): UTC−4 (EDT)
- Area codes: 571, 703
- FIPS code: 51-11230
- GNIS feature ID: 1867585

Bull Run is a census-designated place (CDP) in Prince William County, Virginia, United States. The population was 14,983 at the 2010 census.

== History ==
Two major battles of the Civil War, the First Battle of Bull Run and the Second Battle of Bull Run, took place in the vicinity of Bull Run.

Ben Lomond Plantation was listed on the National Register of Historic Places in 1980.

== Geography ==
Bull Run is located at 38°47′6″N 77°31′25″W (38.785090, −77.523577).

According to the United States Census Bureau, the CDP has a total area of 2.7 square miles (6.9 km^{2}), all land.

== Demographics ==
As of the 2010 census, there were 14,983 people, 5,602 households, and 3,334 families residing in the CDP. There were 5,946 housing units. The racial makeup of the CDP was 46.9% White, 20.1% Black or African American, 0.6% American Indian and Alaska Native, 7.2% Asian, 0% Native Hawaiian and Other Pacific Islander, 19.7% from other races, and 5.6% from two or more races. Hispanic or Latino of any race were 36.9% of the population.

There were 5,602 households, out of which 39.4% had children under the age of 18 living with them, 16.4% had a female householder with no husband present, and 40.5% were non-families. 29.3% of all households were made up of individuals, and 4.3% had someone living alone who was 65 years of age or older. The average household size was 2.67 and the average family size was 3.30.

In the CDP, the population was spread out, with 26.7% under the age of 18, 3.5% from 18 to 21, 41.8% from 25 to 44, 16.5% from 45 to 64, and 3.7% who were 65 years of age or older. The median age was 29.4 years.

As reported in the 2017 American Community Survey, the median income for a household in the CDP was $67,244, and the median income for a family was $64,558. Male full-time workers had a median income of $46,424 versus $48,497 for females. The per capita income for the CDP was $29,612. About 10.0% of families and 10.5% of the population were below the poverty line, including 12.8% of those under age 18 and 20.4% of those age 65 or over.
