= Virginia State Route 784 (Prince William County) =

Highway in Prince William County, Virginia

State Route 784

Route information
- Maintained by VDOT
- Length: 7.95 mi (12.79 km)

Major junctions
- West end: SR 642 in Dale City
- SR 640 in Dale City; I-95 at the Dale City/Woodbridge line
- East end: US 1 in Woodbridge

Location
- Country: United States
- State: Virginia

Highway system
- Virginia Routes; Interstate; US; Primary; Secondary; Byways; History; HOT lanes

Virginia State Route 784 in Prince William County, Virginia, United States is a 7.95-mile (12.79 km) secondary state highway officially named Dale Boulevard for its entire route. It is a divided highway and acts as a major northwest-southeast thoroughfare through the southeastern area of Prince William County, serving Dale City (the road's namesake) as well as the Potomac Mills community and southern Woodbridge area.

== Route description ==
=== Dale City ===
State Route 784/Dale Boulevard begins at the SR 642 (Hoadly Road)/SR 643 (Purcell Road) intersection in northern Dale City where it continues southeast serving many residential areas and providing primary access to parks, schools, and shopping plazas in the area. SR 784 then intersects Ridgefield Road and soon Delaney Road and eventually heads south into central Dale City at the intersection with SR 640 (Minnieville Road). The road continues southeast from there and passes through more residential areas before intersecting Benita Fitzgerald Drive then Gideon Drive (which heads north towards Potomac Mills) and heading east passing the PRTC OmniRide Transit Center and forming a cloverleaf interchange with Interstate 95.

=== Woodbridge ===
After crossing I-95, SR 784 enters Woodbridge, continuing southeast and shortly intersecting with Potomac Center Boulevard, providing access north to the Sentara Northern Virginia Medical Center and the Stonebridge at Potomac Town Center shopping center, and Neabsco Mills Road, which heads south providing access to the Northern Virginia Community College Woodbridge Campus and Freedom High School. SR 784 then ends at U.S. Route 1, with continuation beyond the southeastern terminus as Rippon Boulevard heading towards the Potomac River.

== Major intersections ==
The entire route is in Prince William County.

Location	mi	km	Destinations	Notes
Dale City	0.00	0.00	SR 642 (Hoadly Road) / SR 643 (Purcell Road)	Northwestern terminus of SR 784; continuation northwest beyond terminus as SR 643 (Purcell Road)
Dale City	1.12	1.80	Nottingdale Drive, Princedale Drive	
Dale City	1.77	2.85	Queensdale Drive, Mapledale Avenue	Access to Mapledale Plaza shopping center
Dale City	2.07	3.33	Ridgefield Road	
Dale City	2.33	3.75	Quate Lane, Lindendale Road	
Dale City	2.66	4.28	Delaney Road	
Dale City	3.32	5.34	Hillendale Drive, Kaiser Court	Access to PRTC Hillendale Communter Lot and John D. Jenkins Neighborhood Park
Dale City	3.82	6.15	Glendale Road	
Dale City	3.97	6.39	Gemini Way	Access to PRTC Dale City Commuter Lot
Dale City	4.10	6.60	Gerry Lane, Central Plaza	Access to Center Plaza shopping center and Dale City Neighborhood Library
Dale City	4.21	6.78	SR 640 (Minnieville Road)	
Dale City	4.35– 4.47	7.00– 7.19	Forestdale Shopping Center access roads	Access to Forestdale Shopping Center
Dale City	4.66	7.50	Forestdale Avenue	
Dale City	5.14	8.27	Forestdale Avenue	
Dale City	5.52	8.88	Cloverdale Road	
Dale City	5.77	9.29	Barksdale Street, Cherrydale Drive	
Dale City	6.04	9.72	Benita Fitzgerald Drive	
Dale City	6.19	9.96	Birchdale Avenue	
Dale City	6.47	10.41	Ashdale Avenue, Ashdale Circle	
Dale City	6.59	10.61	Gideon Drive	Access to PRTC OmniRide Transit Center and Potomac Mills
Dale City	6.82	10.98	Ashdale Plaza	Access to Ashdale Plaza shopping center
Dale City–Woodbridge line	6.86– 7.40	11.04– 11.91	I-95 – Richmond, Washington, D.C.	Cloverleaf interchange
Woodbridge	7.58	12.20	Potomac Center Boulevard, Neabsco Mills Road	Access to Stonebridge at Potomac Town Center, Sentara Northern Virginia Medical Center, Northern Virginia Community College Woodbridge Campus, and Freedom High School
Woodbridge	7.95	12.79	US 1 (Jefferson Davis Highway)	Southeastern terminus of SR 784; continuation southeast beyond terminus as Rippon Boulevard
1.000 mi = 1.609 km; 1.000 km = 0.621 mi

== Places along State Route 784 ==
- Andrew Leitch Park
- Dale City Neighborhood Library
- Freedom High School
- John D. Jenkins Neighborhood Park
- Northern Virginia Community College Woodbridge Campus
- PRTC OmniRide Transit Center
- Stonebridge at Potomac Town Center

== Public transportation ==
The Potomac and Rappahannock Transportation Commission (PRTC) operates a local bus route along SR 784/Dale Boulevard, along with two commuter lots nearby the road, the Hillendale Commuter Lot and Dale City Commuter Lot.

== Dale City Independence Day Parade ==
Since July 4, 1970, Dale City has held a nearly 2.5 mi (4.0 km) annual Independence Day parade along SR 784/Dale Boulevard from Mapledale Avenue and Queensdale Drive at Mapledale Plaza to the Center Plaza at Gemini Way near Minnieville Road. The parade usually consists of parade floats, marching bands from local schools, churches, and community groups, martial arts and cheerleading performances, and convoys of motorcycles, police cars and fire engines, and PRTC buses. For 2018, the parade had an estimated 10,000 spectators and it is considered to be the largest 4 July parade in Virginia.

Due to the COVID-19 pandemic, the 2020 Dale City Independence Day Parade was cancelled, therefore cancelling what would have been the 50th consecutive year the parade has been held on July 4 since its first year in 1970.
