= Potomac Mills, Prince William County, Virginia =

Potomac Mills
- CDP
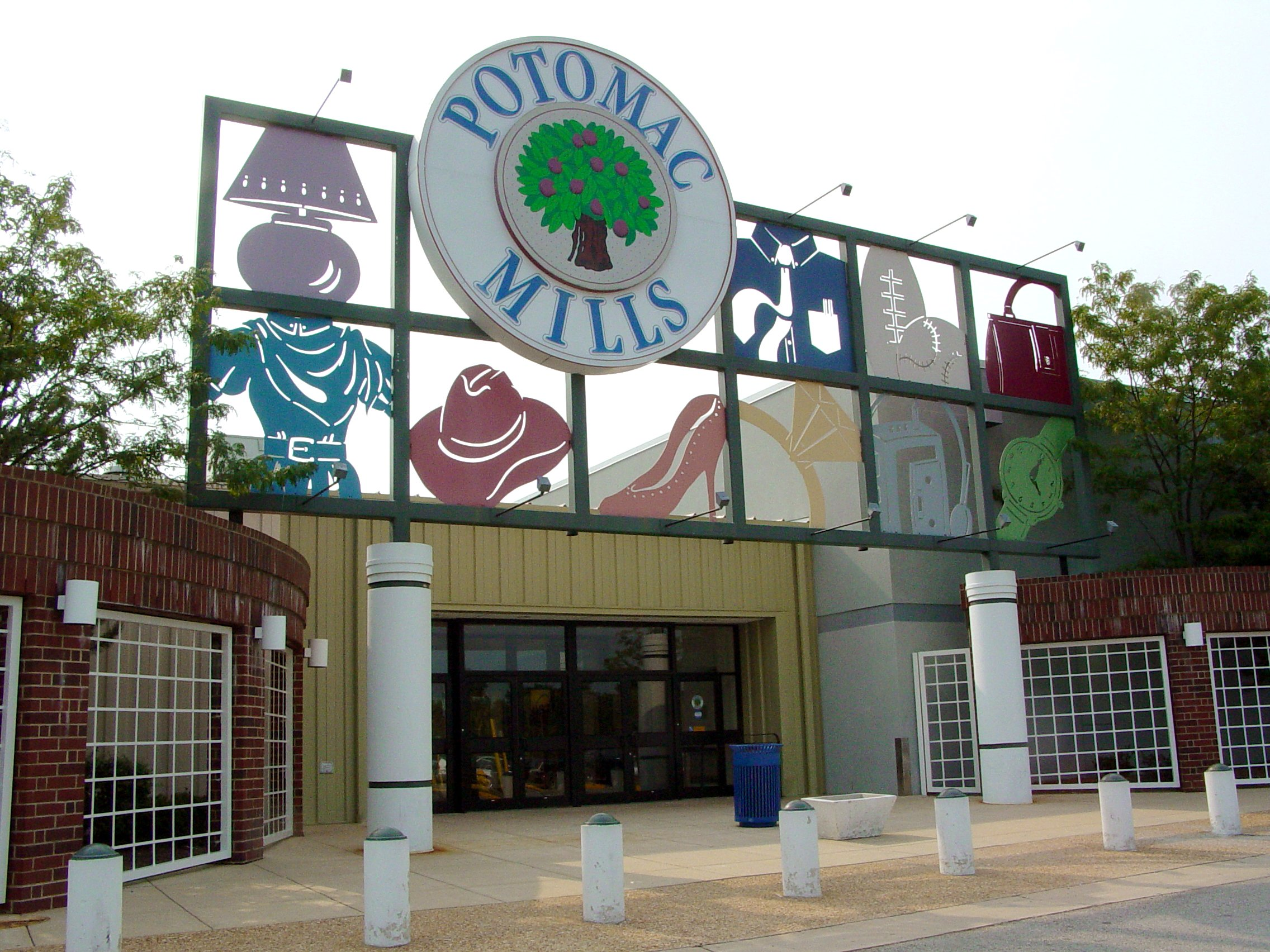
- Entrance to Potomac Mills mall

- Location in Prince William County and the state of Virginia.
- Coordinates: 38°39′20″N 77°18′9″W
- Country: United States
- State: Virginia
- County: Prince William

Population (2010)
  - Total: 5,614
- Time zone: UTC−5 (Eastern (EST))
  - Summer (DST): UTC−4 (EDT)
- ZIP codes: 22192
- FIPS code: 51-64152
- GNIS feature ID: 2629769

Potomac Mills is a census-designated place in Prince William County, Virginia, United States. The population as of the 2010 Census was 5,614. It consists of the Potomac Mills mall and surrounding residential and commercial area, adjoining Dale City and Lake Ridge.

Potomac Mills largely overlaps with the unincorporated community of Bethel.

== Demographics ==
Historical population
Census	Pop.	Note	%±
2010	5,614		—
2020	6,332		12.8%
U.S. Decennial Census; 2010 2020

Potomac Mills was first listed as a census designated place in the 2010 U.S. census formed from part of Dale City CDP and additional area.
