= Woodbridge, Virginia =

- Census-designated place
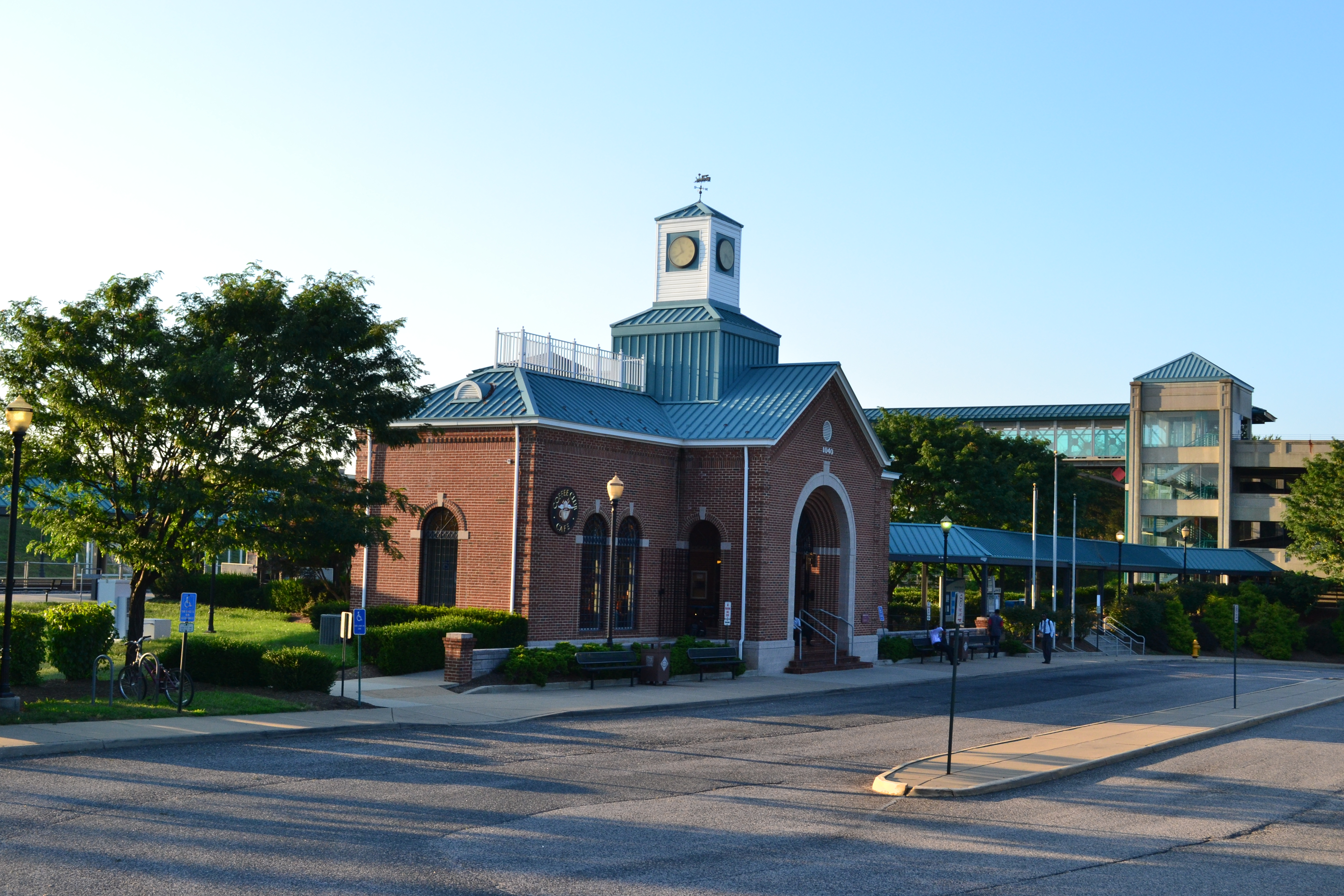
- Woodbridge Railway Station

- Location of Woodbridge in Prince William County and Virginia

- Location within Virginia Location within the United States
- Coordinates: 38°38′37″N 77°15′39″W
- Country: United States
- State: Virginia
- County: Prince William

Area
  - Total: 10.8 sq mi (28.0 km^{2})
  - Land: 10.5 sq mi (27.1 km^{2})
  - Water: 0.31 sq mi (0.8 km^{2})
- Elevation: 75 ft (23 m)

Population (2020)
  - Total: 44,668
  - Density: 4,270/sq mi (1,650/km^{2})
- Time zone: UTC−5 (Eastern (EST))
  - Summer (DST): UTC−4 (EDT)
- ZIP Codes: 22191–22193
- Area codes: 571, 703
- FIPS code: 51-87312
- GNIS feature ID: 1497222

Woodbridge is a census-designated place (CDP) in Prince William County, Virginia, United States, located 20 miles (32 km) south of Washington, D.C. Bounded by the Occoquan and Potomac rivers, Woodbridge had 44,668 residents at the 2020 census.

Woodbridge offers a variety of amenities for residents and visitors, including Potomac Mills Mall and Stonebridge at Potomac Town Center. Woodbridge is served by the Prince William County Public Schools, and the Woodbridge campus of Northern Virginia Community College borders the district. Sentara Northern Virginia Medical Center, a non-profit hospital, formerly Potomac Hospital, recently expanded and now has the capacity to serve 183 patients. Transportation includes access to Interstate 95, two VRE commuter train stations, bus service, and a local "slugging" system, offering residents a variety of transit options.

Woodbridge offers a wide range of recreational opportunities for resident and visitors. The Occoquan Bay National Wildlife Refuge is a natural habitat for a variety of plant and animal life including the bald eagles and ospreys. Veteran's Park and Leesylvania State Park are located on the Potomac River and provide swimming, boating, picnic and hiking services. Close by is Rippon Lodge, the oldest house in Prince William County, which is open for tours throughout the summer. Trails at Leesylvania Park lead to the ancestral home of the Lee family.

== Etymology ==
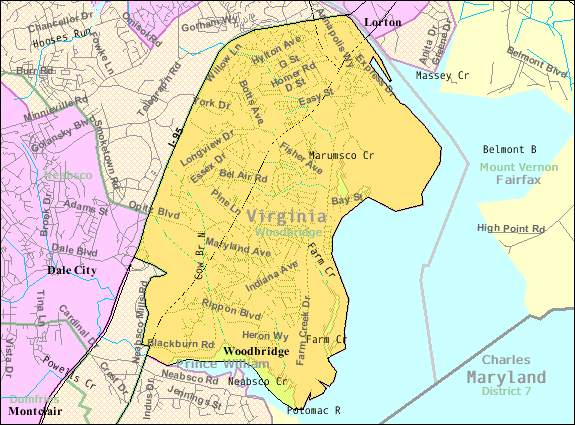
Map of Woodbridge, according to US Census Bureau

Woodbridge takes its name from a wooden toll bridge built in the 18th century to span the Occoquan River. The bridge was constructed by Thomas Mason, son of Founding Father George Mason, as part of the King's Highway, a colonial route that connected northern and southern settlements. The structure itself was built along the Occoquan connecting present day Woodbridge to Fairfax County, it became a recognizable landmark and eventually lent its name to the surrounding communities. Though the term "Woodbridge" does not appear frequently in early records, early 19th-century maps and land documents identify the bridge and nearby ferry sites as key transportation points in Prince William County. The area around the bridge gradually developed into a modest river town-like community, with its growth later influenced by river trade and the expansion of railroad lines later into the 19th century.

== History ==
=== Early era ===
Woodbridge was initially a village composed largely of plantations and later farms and industrial complexes. It dates to at least 1731, when Prince William County was formed out of the Stafford County, Virginia. The first Prince William County Courthouse was erected in Woodbridge, owing to its location halfway between Dumfries and Alexandria, the two largest cities then in Prince William County. With the incorporation of Fairfax County, Woodbridge ceased to be the center of the county, and municipal function eventually shifted westward into Brentsville and eventually to Manassas, where it is today.

In its early days, Woodbridge was dominated by two large plantations. Thomas Mason's Woodbridge Plantation, north of Marumsco Creek, would eventually become known as Deep Hole Plantation. The plantation of Belle Aire, owned initially by the Linton family and then by the Grayson family, was the other prominent plantation in the area. It was situated south of Marumsco creek and served as a field hospital during the Civil War. Belle Aire should not be confused with the Bel Air Plantation, located five miles inland.

The original bridge from which the community took its name was washed away in 1807 following a heavy storm. Subsequently, industrial and economic development shifted toward Occoquan, the next nearest river crossing. The bridge was not replaced until the 20th century, when an iron truss bridge was built. This bridge failed in 1972 during Hurricane Agnes and was eventually replaced by the current structure.

=== After the Second World War ===
During the post-war boom, the largely agrarian plantations were redeveloped as suburban subdivisions. On the grounds of the Deep Hole Plantation, the Army built the East Coast Radio Transmitting Station, which operated from 1950 to 1994. In 1995, the Army turned the land over to the U.S. Fish and Wildlife Service, and it became the Occoquan Bay National Wildlife Refuge. The area directly to the north was home to the Belmont Bay golf course community. Most of the Grayson farm was redeveloped as various subdivisions named after Marumsco Creek. Later, the Woodbridge postal delivery area became the hub that included Dale City and Lake Ridge, which had previously been forged as a planned community in the 1960s and 1970s.

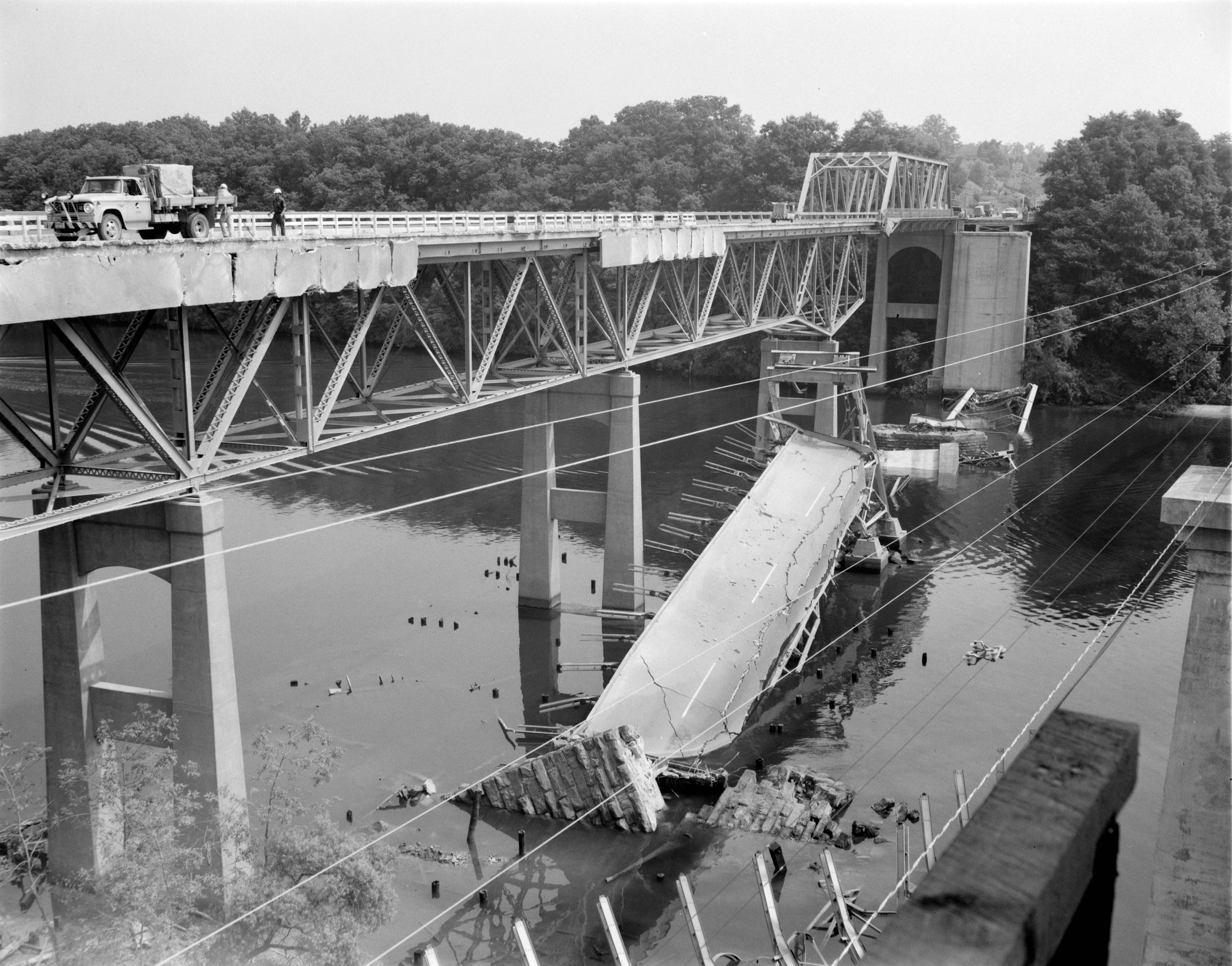
Remains of the Route 1 Bridge following Hurricane Agnes

The Freestone Point Confederate Battery and Rippon Lodge are listed on the National Register of Historic Places.

Tent city

Since c. 2003, numerous people have been trespassing in a 10-acre (4.0 ha) tent city adjacent to the Potomac Mills mall. It is tolerated by the private landlord. In 2018, part of the residents were directed to leave.

== Geography ==
Woodbridge is at 38°38′37″N 77°15′39″W (38.643517, −77.260843). It is located on the peninsula of Linton Neck. According to the United States Census Bureau, in 2000, the CDP has a total area of 10.8 square miles (28 km^{2}), of which 10.5 square miles (27 km^{2}) is land and 0.3 square miles (0.78 km^{2}), or 2.87%, is water. Woodbridge is about 20 miles (32 km) from Washington, D.C.

The 2010 census reconfigured Woodbridge so that the majority of its land area was redesignated Marumsco and Neabsco, Virginia. The southern border of Woodbridge was now Occoquan Road, with the area between Occoquan Road and Opitz Boulevard–Rippon Boulevard being part of Marumsco. All of the former Woodbridge CDP south of Marumsco was designated as Neabsco. However, the areas continued to be addressed Woodbridge. At the 2020 census, the Marumsco CDP was reincorporated into the Woodbridge CDP, and Neabsco was renamed Leesylvania.

=== Climate ===
Woodbridge has a humid subtropical climate, abbreviated as Cfa on climate maps.

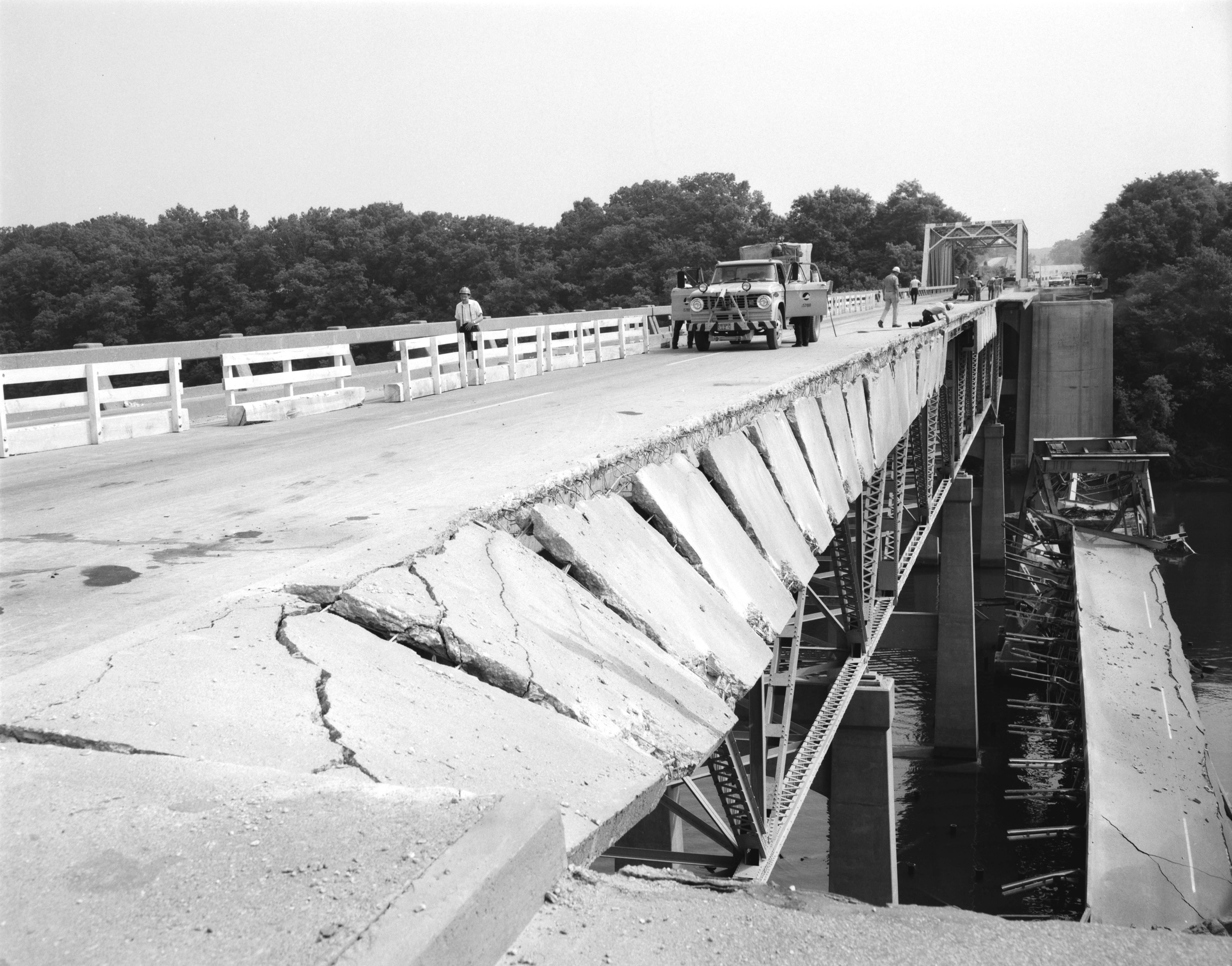
Damage to the Route 1 Bridge over the Occoquan during hurricane Agnes

Woodbridge

Climate chart (precipitation, max. and min. temperature)
J	F	M	A	M	J	J	A	S	O	N	D
2.8 43 24	2.7 46 26	3.6 55 33	3.5 66 42	4.4 74 51	3.9 84 61	3.8 87 66	3.5 86 64	4 80 57	3.4 68 45	3.5 57 36	3.1 46 28
- █ Average max. and min. temperatures in °F
- █ Precipitation totals in inches
- Source: USA.com (13 March, 2021)
Metric conversion
J	F	M	A	M	J	J	A	S	O	N	D
71 6 −4	69 8 −3	91 13 1	89 19 6	112 23 11	99 29 16	97 31 19	89 30 18	102 27 14	86 20 7	89 14 2	79 8 −2
- █ Average max. and min. temperatures in °C
- █ Precipitation totals in mm

=== Nearby towns and communities ===
- Dale City
- Dumfries
- Lake Ridge
- Lorton
- Montclair
- Occoquan

== Demographics ==
Historical population
Census	Pop.	Note	%±
1970	25,412		—
1980	24,004		−5.5%
1990	26,401		10.0%
2000	31,941		21.0%
2010	40,550		27.0%
2020	44,668		10.2%

=== 2020 census ===
As of the 2020 census, Woodbridge had a population of 44,668. The median age was 32.7 years. 26.4% of residents were under the age of 18 and 8.6% of residents were 65 years of age or older. For every 100 females there were 98.8 males, and for every 100 females age 18 and over there were 96.7 males age 18 and over.

100.0% of residents lived in urban areas, while 0.0% lived in rural areas.

There were 14,404 households in Woodbridge, of which 39.7% had children under the age of 18 living in them. Of all households, 43.3% were married-couple households, 20.3% were households with a male householder and no spouse or partner present, and 29.0% were households with a female householder and no spouse or partner present. About 23.8% of all households were made up of individuals and 5.8% had someone living alone who was 65 years of age or older.

There were 15,080 housing units, of which 4.5% were vacant. The homeowner vacancy rate was 1.1% and the rental vacancy rate was 6.0%.

Racial composition as of the 2020 census
Race	Number	Percent
White	11,211	25.1%
Black or African American	9,791	21.9%
American Indian and Alaska Native	506	1.1%
Asian	3,772	8.4%
Native Hawaiian and Other Pacific Islander	54	0.1%
Some other race	12,274	27.5%
Two or more races	7,060	15.8%
Hispanic or Latino (of any race)	20,329	45.5%

=== 2000 census ===
As of the census of 2000, there were 31,941 people, 10,687 households, and 7,769 families residing in the CDP. The population density was 3,047.8 inhabitants per square mile (1,176.8/km^{2}). There were 11,026 housing units at an average density of 1,052.1 per square mile (406.2/km^{2}). The racial makeup of the CDP was 56.34% White, 23.45% African American, 0.55% Native American, 4.90% Asian, 0.17% Pacific Islander, 9.62% from other races, and 4.96% from two or more races. Hispanic or Latino people of any race were 19.07% of the population.

There were 10,687 households, out of which 41.5% had children under the age of 18 living with them, 52.3% were married couples living together, 14.2% had a female householder with no husband present, and 27.3% were non-families. Of all households 20.4% were made up of individuals, and 3.9% had someone living alone who was 65 years of age or older. The average household size was 2.96 and the average family size was 3.40.

In the CDP, the population was spread out, with 30.0% under the age of 18, 10.7% from 18 to 24, 35.7% from 25 to 44, 17.0% from 45 to 64, and 6.7% who were 65 years of age or older. The median age was 30 years. For every 100 females, there were 102.5 males. For every 100 females age 18 and over, there were 100.2 males.

The median income for a household in the CDP was $75,525, and the median income for a family was $52,362. Males had a median income of $35,538 versus $28,587 for females. The per capita income for the CDP was $19,810. About 4.6% of families and 5.5% of the population were below the poverty line, including 7.7% of those under age 18 and 5.9% of those age 65 or over.

=== Housing values ===
The estimate median house or condo value was $294,156 as of 2008. As of 2013, the average home sale price was $222,940.

== Education ==
=== Public schools ===
Woodbridge is in the Prince William County Public Schools school division.

Nearby public high schools include:

- Forest Park Senior High School
- Freedom High School
- Gar-Field Senior High School
- C.D. Hylton Senior High School
- Potomac Senior High School
- Woodbridge Senior High School

Middle schools include:

- Fred Lynn Middle School
- Lake Ridge Middle School
- Rippon Middle School
- Woodbridge Middle School

Elementary schools include:

- Antietam Elementary School
- Belmont Elementary School
- Elizabeth Vaughan Elementary School
- Featherstone Elementary School
- Lake Ridge Elementary School
- Marumsco Hills Elementary School
- Neabsco Elementary School
- Occoquan Elementary School
- Potomac View Elementary School
- R. Dean Kilby Elementary School
- River Oaks Elementary School
- Springwoods Elementary School
- West Ridge Elementary School

=== Private education ===
Private high schools:

- Christ Chapel Academy (Pre–12)
- Heritage Christian School (K–12)
- Saint John Paul the Great Catholic High School

Private middle schools, elementary schools, and preschools:

- Academy Day Care (Pre-1)
- Cardinal Montessori School (Pre-4)
- Christ Chapel Academy (Pre-12)
- Cloverdale School (Pre-2)
- Manassas Christian School
- Manassas Christian School Academy
- Minnieland Private Day School (Pre-K)
- Prince William Academy (Pre-8)
- Riverview Baptist Day School (Pre-K)
- Saint Thomas Aquinas Regional School (Pre-8)
- Young World Development Center (Pre-4)

=== Colleges and universities ===
- Northern Virginia Community College, Woodbridge Campus
- Stratford University (permanently closed as of 2022)

== Attractions and culture ==
Woodbridge experienced its current development boom in the mid-1980s, after being a municipality composed largely of either farms or industrial complexes, as an annex of sorts of Dale City, which had been forged as a planned community in the 1960s and 1970s.

Woodbridge is home to Potomac Mills Mall (managed by Simon Property Group), one of the largest shopping centers in northern Virginia. Woodbridge is a suburban city because many of its residents are employed in nearby Washington, D.C.

Due in part to the I-95 and I-66 HOV waiver given to hybrid vehicles, many D.C. government workers have relocated to the area to take advantage of the lower-priced housing. However, in July 2006, the hybrid/HOV privilege was revoked. Vehicles registered prior to July 2006 were exempted from occupancy requirements in all (HOV) facilities in Virginia until July 1, 2009.

Other cultural resources include Rippon Lodge, one of the oldest houses in Prince William County, which was opened as a park and museum in October 2007.

=== Sports ===
Woodbridge was the former home of the Potomac Nationals minor league baseball club, before their relocation to Fredericksburg. Their former stadium, the Pfitzner Stadium, is located in Woodbridge. The stadium is now the site of many community events.

On May 24, 2022, the Washington Commanders announced potential plans for a new stadium complex in Woodbridge, to include a stadium, amphitheater, retail hub, and office space.

== Transportation ==
=== Highways ===
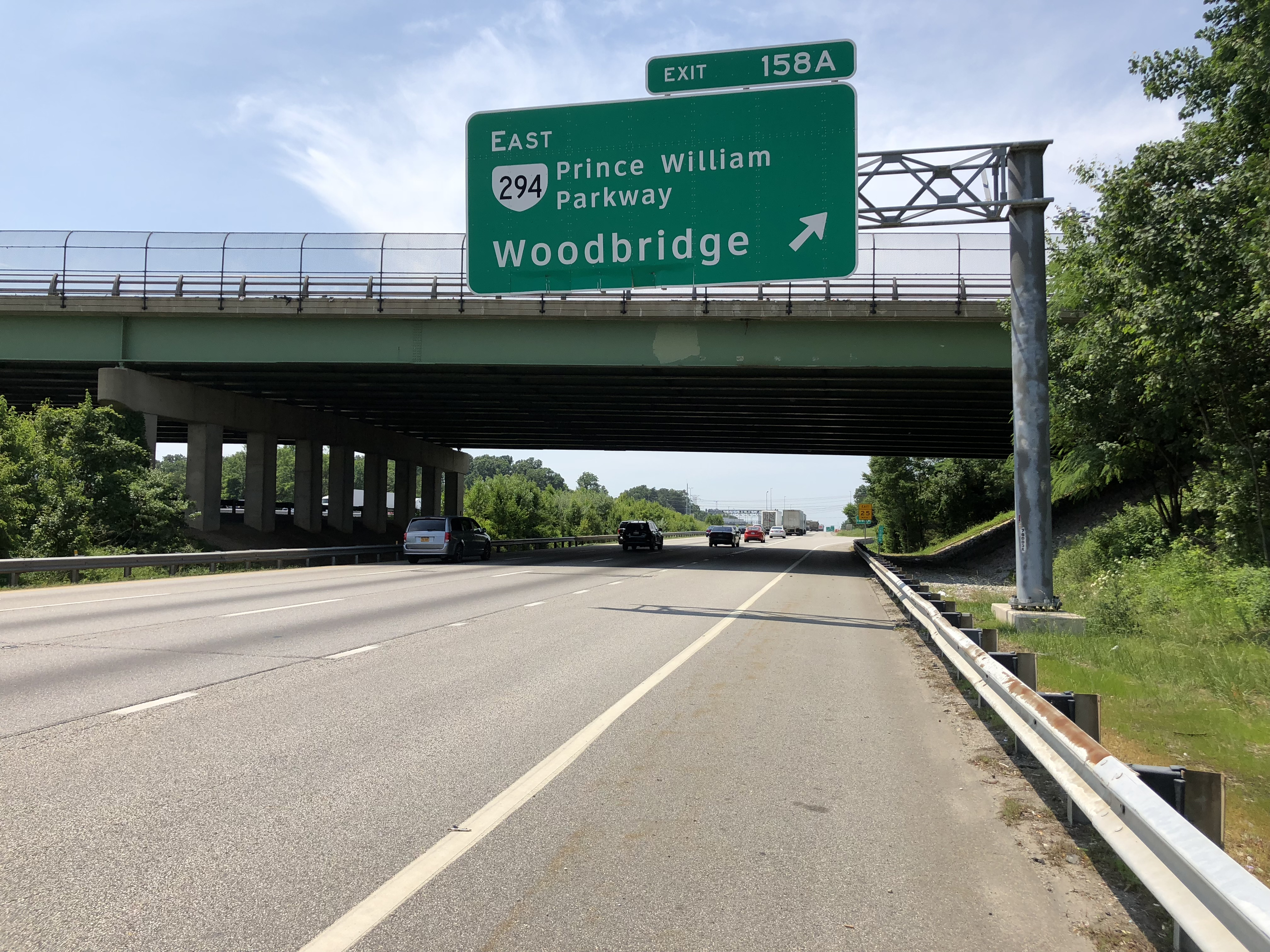
The VA Route 294 Woodbridge exit on I-95

Passing north—south through Woodbridge is U.S. Route 1, with Interstate 95, which forms the western boundary of the CDP, running parallel to it further west. Three other major routes, all of which have interchanges with I-95 and terminate at U.S. 1, are VA 123 (Gordon Boulevard), which runs north to Fairfax and ends in Arlington at the Washington, D.C. border, VA 294 (Prince William Parkway), which runs northeast to and ends in the Manassas area, and SR 784 (Dale Boulevard)—which heads northeast to Dale City and ends west of Hoadly. Other major roads in Woodbridge include SR 639 (Horner Road), SR 906 (Occoquan Road), and SR 2000 (Opitz Boulevard).

=== Public transportation ===
The Potomac and Rappahannock Transportation Commission (PRTC), which operates its OmniRide and OmniRide Local bus services throughout Prince William County, is headquartered in Woodbridge. Two routes operate in Woodbridge; the Woodbridge/Lake Ridge (WOODLOC) route—serving the two communities of Woodbridge and Lake Ridge, and the Route 1 (RT1LOC) route, which runs from the Woodbridge train station down to Quantico.

Woodbridge station, at 1040 Express Way, is owned by Virginia Railway Express (VRE) and serves Amtrak's Northeast Regional line and VRE's Fredericksburg Line. The train station receives bus service from the OmniRide Woodbridge/Lake Ridge and Route 1 routes.

== Notable people ==
- Zuill Bailey, three-time Grammy Award winning cellist
- Jeff Baker, professional baseball player
- Brian Bates, soccer player
- Brandon Brown, professional stock car racing driver
- Russell Davis, professional football player, Pittsburgh Steelers
- Michael Edwards, soccer player
- James Eike, birdwatcher and former president of the Virginia Society of Ornithology
- Benita Fitzgerald-Brown, 100 metres hurdles gold medal winner, 1984 Summer Olympics
- Christine Fox, acting U.S. Secretary of Defense
- William Grayson, Revolutionary-era Lawyer and military leader
- Da'Shawn Hand, professional football player, Miami Dolphins
- Emmylou Harris, singer, songwriter, musician, and Country Music Hall of Fame inductee
- Meyers Leonard, professional basketball player, Miami Heat, Milwaukee Bucks, and Portland Trail Blazers
- Tony Lilly, professional football player, Denver Broncos
- Nelson Martinez, professional soccer player, Loudoun United
- Tommy Richman, singer and songwriter
- David Robinson, professional basketball player, San Antonio Spurs
- Shaboozey, musician, singer-songwriter, filmmaker, and record producer
- Alex Taylor, distance runner
