= Dale City, Virginia =

- Census-designated place (CDP)
- Motto: The Friendliest Little City Around
- Location in Prince William County and the state of Virginia.
- Coordinates: 38°38′54″N 77°20′32″W
- Country: United States
- State: Virginia
- County: Prince William

Area
  - Total: 15.1 sq mi (39.0 km^{2})
  - Land: 15.1 sq mi (39.0 km^{2})
  - Water: 0 sq mi (0.0 km^{2})
- Elevation: 230 ft (70 m)

Population (2020)
  - Total: 72,088
  - Density: 4,873/sq mi (1,881.6/km^{2})
- Time zone: UTC−5 (Eastern (EST))
  - Summer (DST): UTC−4 (EDT)
- ZIP code: 22193
- Area codes: 571, 703
- FIPS code: 51-21088
- GNIS feature ID: 1496866

Dale City is a census-designated place (CDP) in Prince William County, Virginia, United States, located 25 miles (40 km) southwest of Washington, D.C. As of 2020, the total population was 72,088.

The community is roughly bounded by Hoadly Road to the northwest, Prince William Parkway to the north, Smoketown Road to the northeast, Gideon Drive to the east, and Cardinal Drive to the south.

== History ==
Dale City was the idea of real estate developer, Cecil Don Hylton, who chose the term because it aptly described the "hills and dales" of the rolling Virginia Piedmont, where he developed the community. Hylton began his career as a "huckster", a young man who sold farm goods and produce at the farmers' market in Washington, DC. He later began a sod business after several requests from his regular clients. Hylton ran several dozen trucks and pioneered new technologies in the industry. After the post-war housing boom, he moved into homebuilding. Throughout Hylton's career, he constructed apartments, commercial shopping centers, and over 22,000 homes. Along the way, he began his own sewer company, Dale Service Company, as well as the first cable television companies in Prince William County.

Hylton's company, Hylton Enterprises, began in Dale City in 1960 approximately one mile east of Interstate 95 and continued to build west towards Hoadly Road (State Route 642). By 1969, the first six communities were completed. Many more were added in the 1970s and 1980s.

Several places in Dale City are named after Hylton, such as C.D. Hylton High School and the Hylton Memorial Chapel. More recently, the Hylton Foundation underwrote a major new addition to Potomac Hospital in nearby Woodbridge. Hylton's companies have branched into new markets, especially real estate of existing houses. Hylton Realty now sells property in and near Dale City. Hylton Enterprises manages commercial properties still controlled by the Hylton family, including several shopping centers, as well as several oddly-shaped parcels of unimproved land. These parcels were land that could not be built on or were proffered to the county; Andrew Leitch Park is one such parcel that has been given to the local Park Authority.

Because Dale City was built before most of eastern Prince William County was developed, it has its own water and sewer systems, separate from the ones in Occoquan, Woodbridge, Dumfries, Triangle, and Lake Ridge. Water service is provided by Virginia-American Water Company, and since 2013, Virginia-American also provides sewer service to Dale City through their purchase of the Dale Service Corporation.

Russell House and Store is a historic early 19th century building, located on Minnieville Road.

== Communities ==
Each of the communities (often referred to as neighborhoods) ends in 'dale'. The streets along Dale Boulevard (generally but not limited to) proceed alphabetically when followed from east to west starting from Gideon Dr. and ending at Hoadly Rd.: Ashdale, Barksdale, Birchdale, Cherrydale, Cloverdale, Darbydale, Emberdale, Evansdale, Forestdale, Glendale, Hillendale, Kerrydale, Kirkdale, Lindendale (which includes Surrydale Ct.), Mapledale, Nottingdale, Orangedale, Princedale, Queensdale, Ridgedale, Silverdale, and Trentdale. Most street names in each neighborhood begin with the first letter of the neighborhood.

== Attractions and culture ==
Dale City is near Potomac Mills Mall, the fourth largest shopping mall in Northern Virginia at 1.54 million square feet, and the largest outlet mall in the United States.

Across from the Nottingdale and next to the Mapledale communities is Andrew Leitch Park, which includes a water park.

== Geography ==
Dale City is located at 38°38′54″N 77°20′32″W (38.648284, −77.342350).

According to the United States Census Bureau, the CDP has a total area of 15.0 square miles (39.0 km^{2}), all land.

Dale City is often confused to be a part of neighboring Woodbridge, due to the U.S. Postal Service grouping the area into the larger Woodbridge postal area. However both are proper and separate census designated place (CDP).

== Demographics ==
Historical population
Census	Pop.	Note	%±
2010	65,969		—
2020	72,088		9.3%

=== 2020 census ===
As of the 2020 census, Dale City had a population of 72,088. The median age was 35.1 years. 26.9% of residents were under the age of 18 and 9.8% of residents were 65 years of age or older. For every 100 females there were 96.8 males, and for every 100 females age 18 and over there were 95.2 males age 18 and over.

100.0% of residents lived in urban areas, while 0.0% lived in rural areas.

There were 20,958 households in Dale City, of which 45.0% had children under the age of 18 living in them. Of all households, 57.8% were married-couple households, 14.7% were households with a male householder and no spouse or partner present, and 22.7% were households with a female householder and no spouse or partner present. About 15.9% of all households were made up of individuals and 5.3% had someone living alone who was 65 years of age or older.

There were 21,451 housing units, of which 2.3% were vacant. The homeowner vacancy rate was 0.7% and the rental vacancy rate was 3.4%.

Racial composition as of the 2020 census
Race	Number	Percent
White	19,450	27.0%
Black or African American	17,476	24.2%
American Indian and Alaska Native	706	1.0%
Asian	8,136	11.3%
Native Hawaiian and Other Pacific Islander	93	0.1%
Some other race	15,343	21.3%
Two or more races	10,884	15.1%
Hispanic or Latino (of any race)	26,209	36.4%

=== 2010 census ===
As of the 2010 census, the racial breakdown was as follows:

- 35.1% White
- 28.8% Black
- 7.9% Asian
- 0.7% Native American or Native Alaskan
- 0.2% Native Hawaiian or Other Pacific Islander
- 27.2% Hispanic (10.7% Salvadoran, 3.6% Mexican, 2.3% Puerto Rican, 1.4% Honduran, 1.3% Guatemalan, 1.2% Peruvian, 1.0% Bolivian)

=== 2006 American Community Survey ===
According to the U.S. census American Community Survey of 2006, 31.3% of Dale City's population is foreign born.

The median income for a household in the CDP was $71,179, and the median income for a family was $72,021 (these figures had risen to $79,075 and $80,382 respectively as of a 2007 estimate). Males had a median income of $50,920 versus $43,389 for females. The per capita income for the CDP was $26,864. About 3.3% of families and 4.8% of the population were below the poverty line, including 5.2% of those under age 18 and 17.6% of those age 65 or over.

== Government ==
Being a census designated place (CDP), Dale City does not have an elected mayor and instead Prince William County directly administers the area.

=== Elected Officials ===
==== Federal Elected Officials ====
- U.S. Senior Senator – Mark R. Warner (D-VA)
- U.S. Junior Senator – Tim Kaine (D-VA)
- U.S. House Representative – Eugene Vindman (D-VA-07)

Dale City falls entirely into Virginia's 7th Congressional District.

==== State Elected Officials ====
- State Senator - Jeremy S. McPike (D-VA-29)
- State Delegate - Briana D. Sewell (D-VA-25)
- State Delegate - Luke E. Torian (D-VA-24)

Dale City falls entirely into Virginia's 29th Senate District

Dale City is roughly split into two House of Delegate Districts, with the 25th House of Delegates district in the northern half and the 24th House of Delegates district in the southern half.

== Economy ==
The community is almost entirely made of residential areas, with the majority of the population being commuters working in other parts of Northern Virginia and Washington, D.C.

There are some small shopping plazas however, with most featuring anchor grocery stores such as two Giant Foods, one Safeway, and one Food Lion. There is also an At Home on Dale Boulevard, that opened after a K-Mart in the same location closed down in 2014.

== Notable people ==
- Benita Fitzgerald-Brown – former American hurdler
- Eugene Vindman – U.S. representative
