= Stonebridge at Potomac Town Center =

Mixed-use in Prince William County, Virginia, U.S.

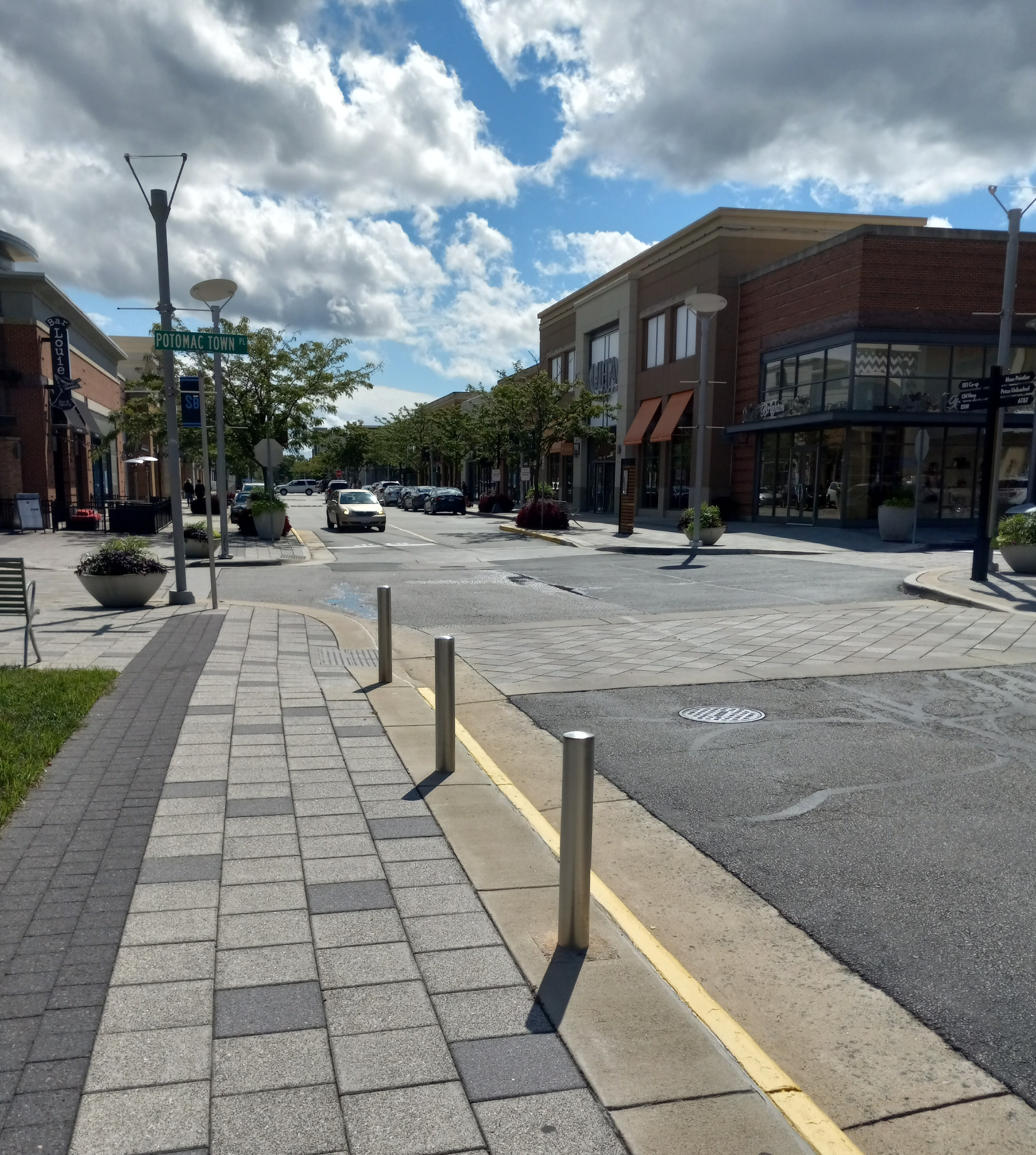
- Potomac Town Place looking southeast (September 2021)

General information
- Type: Mixed-use
- Location: Woodbridge, Virginia, U.S., 14801 Dining Way, 22191
- Coordinates: 38.629171°N 77.288060°W
- Opening: 2008; 18 years ago (first store); October 13, 2012; 14 years ago (grand opening)
- Owner: Kimco Realty Corporation
- Operator: Kimco Realty Corporation

Technical details
- Floor area: 482,631 square feet (44,837.9 m^{2})

Design and construction
- Architect: Streetsense
- Developer: The Mills Corporation (2003–2007); Roadside Development LLC and BlackRock, Inc. (2007–2012)

Other information
- Number of stores: 50+ (at peak)
- Parking: On-site parking lots; Neabsco-Potomac Commuter Garage

Website
- stonebridgeptc.com

Stonebridge at Potomac Town Center, also commonly referred to as Stonebridge PTC or simply Stonebridge, is a lifestyle center in Woodbridge, Virginia, United States. It features a mix of retail, office buildings, and apartments. The complex is adjacent to the Potomac Mills Mall.

It was developed by Roadside Development LLC, in a joint venture with BlackRock, Inc. The Mills Corporation was originally planned as the developer. Stonebridge is located along Interstate 95 just east of the freeway, with Opitz Boulevard (SR 2000) to the north, Dale Boulevard (SR 784) to the south, and Potomac Center Boulevard to the east. Continuous expansions to the center are made, with recent additions such as the Alamo Drafthouse Cinema and Potomac Town Center condominiums.

== History ==
=== 2003–2012: Development and opening ===
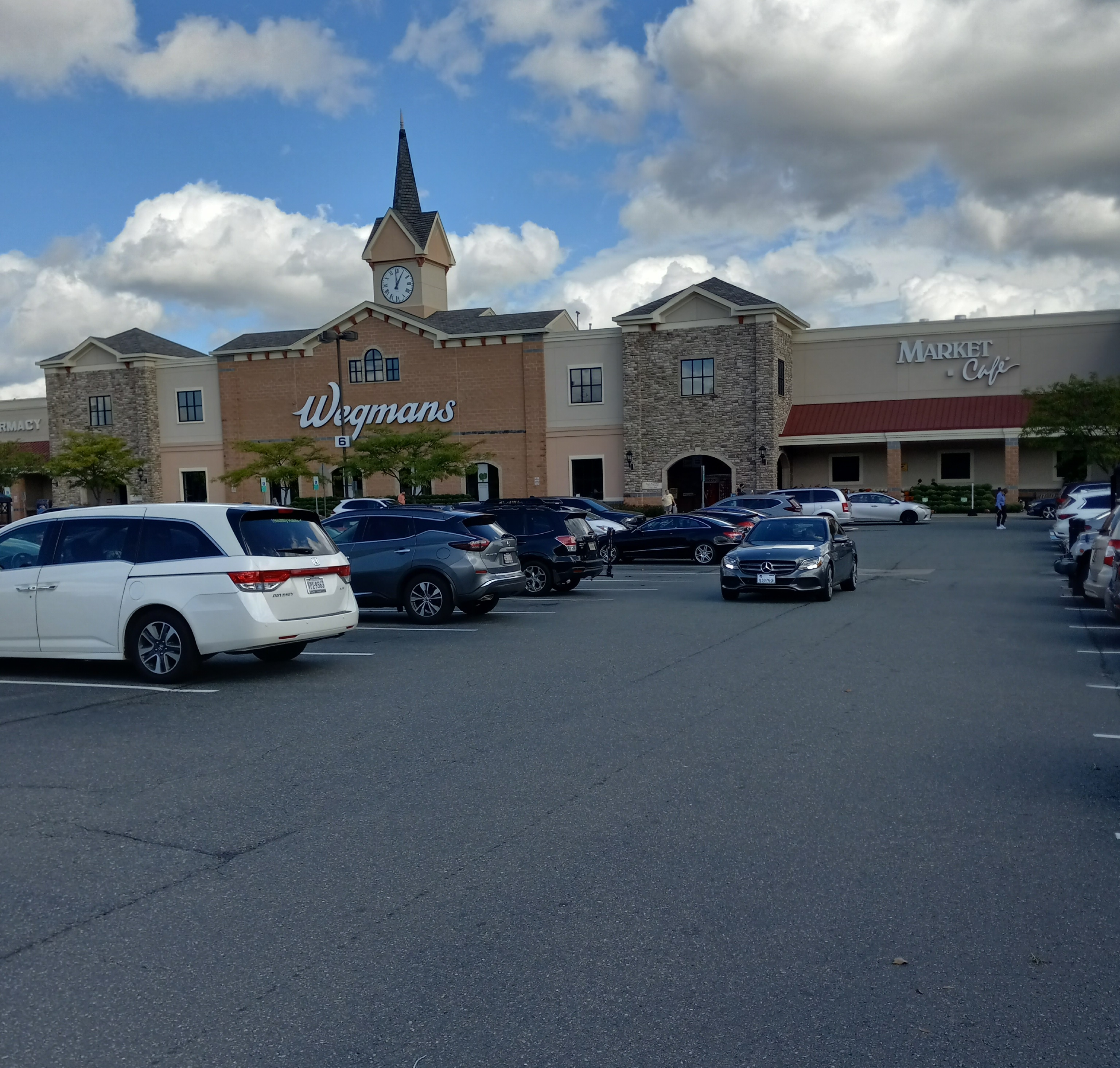
Wegmans (September 2021)

Planning on Stonebridge at Potomac Town Center started in the early 2000s, as part of Prince William County's broader initiative to promote mixed-use developments along the Interstate 95 corridor. This would help economically revitalize the eastern area of the county and the Woodbridge, Virginia area. The 2003 Potomac Communities Revitalization Plan designated the site of Stonebridge PTC as a "Regional Activity Center", suitable for commercial and residential services.

The original developer of the project, The Mills Corporation of Chevy Chase, Maryland, planned the complex to be adjacent to the Potomac Mills mall. However, the company was being investigated by the Securities and Exchange Commission (SEC) for its financial problems. As a result, The Mills Corporation invested approximately $225 million for the construction to Roadside Development and BlackRock in 2007.

Construction of Stonebridge first began in 2007, with the flagship store Wegmans opening in 2008 at the northern end as Phase I of the project. In the summer of 2012, a plot of forested area beside Stonebridge was chosen to be the new Potomac Nationals stadium, replacing their current home at Pfitzner Stadium along with a commuter parking garage. In August of that year, it was announced that Phase II of Stonebridge at Potomac Town Center would open in October, with construction continuing. Between 2010 and 2012, contractor Hensel Phelps constructed over 249,000 square feet (23,100 m^{2}) of multi-tenant retail shells across six separate buildings.

The grand opening of the shopping center was on October 13, 2012, with some businesses remaining under construction. A notable example is Old Navy, which did not open until November 2012.

=== 2013–2018: Early years ===
Toby Keith's I Love This Bar & Grill opened in December 2013, but abruptly closed permanently in May 2015. The JBG Companies acquired Stonebridge for $225 million on December 21, 2015. By then, the complex was 90% leased, featuring the Apple Store, DSW Designer Shoe Warehouse, and P. F. Changs.

In 2017, plans for the stadium were canceled and the team moved to Fredericksburg to a new stadium in 2020, and plans for only the commuter garage remained. The commuter garage would be the first in Prince William County and plans for the project will include a ramp providing access to the Interstate 95 Express Lanes.

It was announced in April 2017 that Alamo Drafthouse Cinema (operating as Alamo Drafthouse Cinema Woodbridge) would open at Stonebridge, being its fourth Virginia location and the largest movie theater in the Woodbridge area. This led to the forced closure of several tenants. Alamo had a soft opening on June 9, 2018, with a complete grand opening on June 14 following the premiere of Incredibles 2.

=== 2023–present ===
On August 25, 2023, Kimco Realty Corporation acquired the shopping center for $173 million. Crumbl Cookies opened at Stonebridge in early September 2023. In late May 2025, Cooper's Hawk Winery & Restaurant was announced to open next year, replacing Orvis. In June 2025, Brew Republic Bierworks was announced to close one month later, citing "landlord troubles."

The Neabsco-Potomac Commuter Garage had its grand opening in mid-November 2024, with 1,400 spaces and 70 electric vehicle charging stations.

== Residential ==
Stonebridge has two residential areas:

- Bell Stonebridge Apartments, formerly called Stonebridge Terrace prior to the Bell Partners acquisition, a 2-building 308-unit apartment complex located northeast of the shopping center.
- Potomac Town Center, a new small community of luxury townhome-style condominiums by Lennar.

== See also ==
- Arundel Mills Marketplace
- ArundelPreserve
- Tsawwassen Commons
- Concord Marketplace
- Village at Pittsburgh Mills
