= Farrs Corner, Virginia =

Unincorporated community in Virginia, United States

- Unincorporated community
- Location within Northern Virginia Location within Virginia Location within the United States
- Coordinates: 38°44′32″N 77°20′27″W
- Country: United States
- State: Virginia
- County: Fairfax
- Time zone: UTC-5 (Eastern (EST))
  - Summer (DST): UTC-4 (EDT)
- Area codes: 571 & 703
- GNIS feature ID: 1496892

Farrs Corner is an unincorporated community in Fairfax County, in the U.S. state of Virginia.

Located about five miles southeast of the Clifton town proper and two miles north of Lake Ridge CDP, it features a Fairfax Station address. It is named after the junction between Virginia State Route 643, when it is called "Henderson Road", and Virginia State Route 610, when it is called Wolf Run Shoals Road.

Nearby neighborhoods include the Bull Subdivision, Ashleigh of Clifton, Crestridge and Stillwell Acres.

== In popular culture ==
In the eleventh series X-Files episode 'This', Fox Mulder's address is given as the fictional 227700 Wallis Road, Farrs Corner.
