= Potomac Mills =

Shopping mall in Prince William County, Virginia, U.S.

Coordinates: 38.6434°N 77.2953°W

- Interior view (January 2025)
- Location: Woodbridge, Virginia, United States
- Address: 2700 Potomac Mills Circle
- Opened: September 19, 1985; 41 years ago
- Renovated: May 2008; August 2013; 2024–2025
- Previous names: Washington Outlet Mall (initially planned)
- Developer: Western Development Corporation; KanAm Grunderbesitz GmbH
- Manager: Simon Premium Outlets; The Mills: A Simon Company
- Owner: Simon Property Group
- Architect: Wah Yee Associates
- Num. of stores: 225 (at peak)
- Num. of anchor tenants: 20 (at peak)
- Floor area: 1,540,304 square feet (143,098.9 m^{2})
- Floors: 1
- Website: www.simon.com/mall/potomac-mills
- Building details
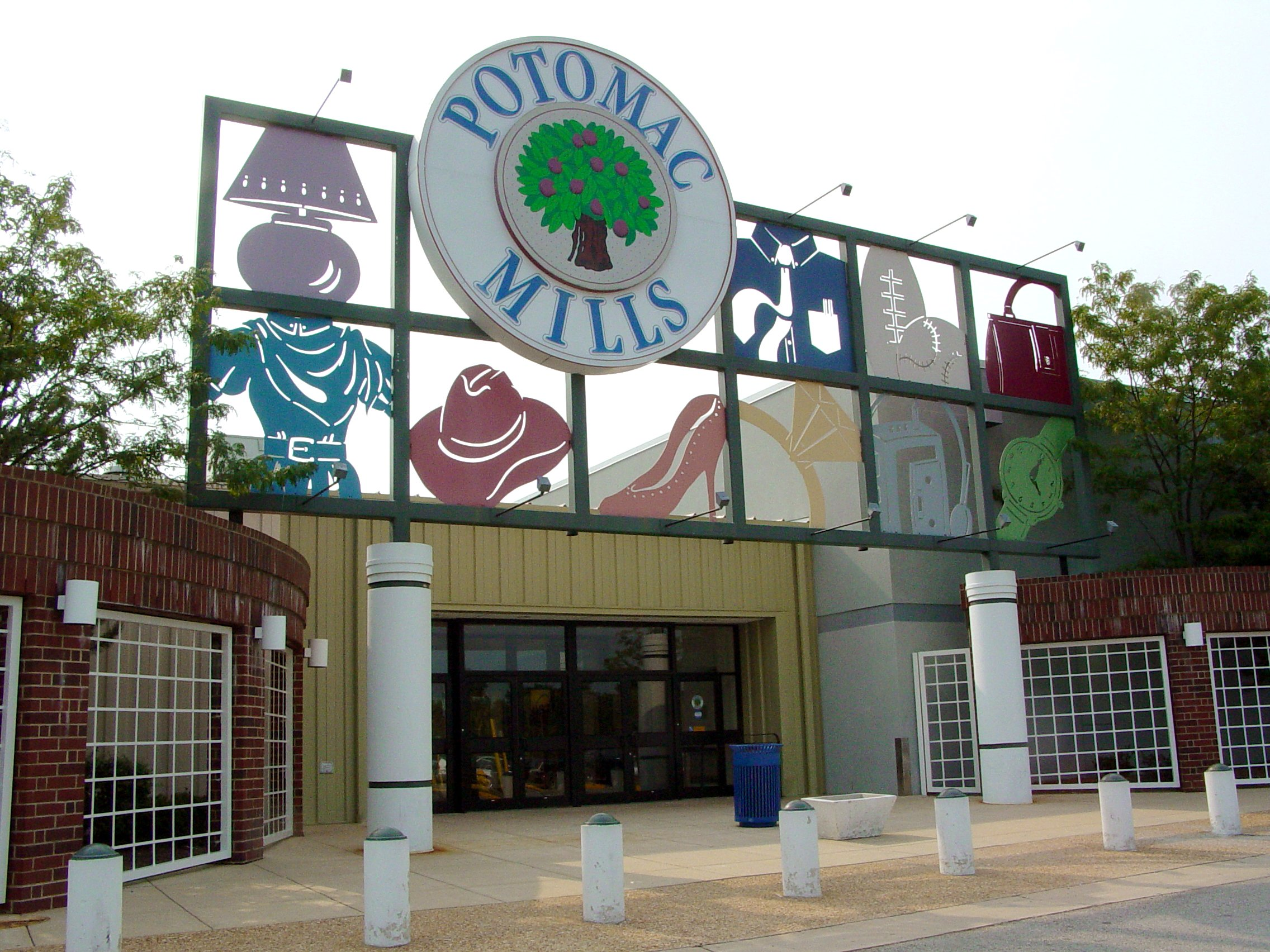
- Main entrance (August 2005)

General information
- Status: Operational

Renovating team
- Architects: Bartlett Hartley & Mulkey Architects (2024–2025)
- Renovating firm: Simon Property Group

Potomac Mills is a super-regional outlet mall in Woodbridge, Virginia, part of the Washington, D.C. metropolitan area. As the first Landmark Mills mall developed by the Western Development Corporation (which completed a corporate spin-off as the Mills Corporation in April 1994), the company and the mall were acquired by Simon Property Group in April 2007. The mall has its own census-designated place (CDP), called Potomac Mills, Prince William County, Virginia.

Simon claims it to be the largest outlet mall in Virginia. It has also been claimed to be the top tourist attraction in Virginia, but the commonwealth tourism board ranked it as tenth in 2004. Since its opening in 1985, the mall has undergone several renovations and anchor changes, including JCPenney's conversion into a department store in 2011, and housing Vans Skatepark from 2001 until its closure in 2004.

== History ==
=== 1984–2004: Development, opening, and early years ===
Washington, D.C.-based real estate developer Herbert S. Miller and his firm Western Development Corporation developed Potomac Mills as a prototype for a shopping center which would combine elements of a regional mall with discount retail, known as the Landmark Mills template. Originally called "Washington Outlet Mall" during planning stages, it was not planned to be enclosed until the last minute.

The 130 acres (53 ha) selected for construction were mostly farmland and woods, although it included several homes and businesses. The Prince William Board of Supervisors approved the first of several rezonings for the mall on February 21, 1984, after a fight over the proposed 140 feet (43 m)-tall, 1,260 square feet (117 m^{2}) illuminated sign. Potomac Mills began construction that same year near Opitz Boulevard and I-95. The mall was designed by Wah Yee Associates of Michigan, and was a joint venture involving the German-based KanAm Grunderbesitz GmbH, which helped develop and fund the project.

The first phase of the mall opened September 19, 1985. Comprising what are now Neighborhoods 1 and 2, it occupied approximately 650,000 square feet (60,000 m^{2}) and had parking for over 5,500 cars. The second phase, completed in 1986, added another 550,000 square feet (51,000 m^{2}) of retail space in Neighborhood 2, and AMC Theatres Potomac Mills 10. The IKEA location at Potomac Mills was one of the company's earliest retail outlets in America, and proved so popular that it eventually required a new, dedicated building adjacent to the primary Potomac Mills complex.

The success of Potomac Mills led to Western Development Corporation to develop the Landmark Mills portfolio, which included Franklin Mills in Philadelphia, Pennsylvania, Gurnee Mills in Lake County, Illinois, and Sawgrass Mills in South Florida. Western Development Corporation completed a corporate spin-off to form a public real estate investment trust (REIT) known as the Mills Corporation in April 1994. AMC Theatres expanded to 15 screens, and at around October 1996, The Mills Corporation, under new CEO Laurence C. Siegel, announced a 300,000-square-foot (28,000 m^{2}) expansion to add more entertainment-based chains, and theme restaurants to Potomac Mills, inspired by the development of Ontario Mills near Los Angeles, California; this would include expanding AMC Potomac Mills 15 to 30 screens. Around 2004, AMC Theatres relocated within the mall, and opened the expanded AMC Potomac Mills 18 movie theater.

In 1999, Waccamaw Corp. merged with HomePlace Stores Inc., and later downsized and rebranded the Potomac Mills Waccamaw Pottery to Waccamaw's HomePlace; a 61,640 sq ft (5,727 m^{2}) portion of the space was taken over by Vans Skatepark, which opened on April 15, 2000, and closed on December 31, 2004, due to high operating costs and the rise of free public parks. Waccamaw's HomePlace closed in June 2001.

=== 2006–2020: Simon Property Group ===
JCPenney Outlet Store entrance during liquidation (May 2011)

JCPenney storefront after department store conversion (August 2018)

By May 2006, The Mills Corp. was under investigation by the Securities and Exchange Commission due to its financial problems. As a result, in February 2007, the company's portfolio, including Potomac Mills, would be acquired by Simon Property Group and Farallon Capital Management for $1.64 billion. The acquisition was completed in April 2007, and Mills was rebranded The Mills: A Simon Company. A 152,000 sq ft (14,100 m^{2}) Costco Wholesale opened at the mall on May 5, 2007. In May 2008, Simon announced a 50,000-square-foot (4,600 m^{2}) expansion featuring new retail and restaurant space. The expansion was scheduled to start in the fall of 2008.

Bloomingdale's - The Outlet Store had its grand opening on August 20, 2010, as Bloomingdale's first outlet store. On June 2, 2011, an expansion to the mall's "Fashion District" in Neighborhood 1 would add Puma Outlet, Rockport Outlet, and a Tumi outlet concept store. Commuter parking spaces at Potomac Mills decreased by 75%. In May 2011, the JCPenney Outlet Store began liquidation sales, and closed its doors in July of that year. It was converted into a traditional department store in October 2011, as JCPenney announced that it would sell its outlet division to SB Capital Group to focus on its core retail operations and online businesses.

In March 2012, Simon Property Group acquired full control of the property by buying out Farallon's stake in 26 Landmark Mills malls for $1.5 billion. Bailey Banks & Biddle Outlet would debut on March 31, 2012. By August 25, 2013, the mall was undergoing interior renovations, with the additions of Janie and Jack, Starbucks Coffee, Cole Haan Outlet, Buy Buy Baby, Christmas Tree Shops, Kay Jewelers Outlet, and the relocations of Entry 5, Saks Off 5th and Books-A-Million. The Cheesecake Factory and Bobby's Burger Palace would anchor the new south entrance plaza.

By September 22, 2014, Kate Spade New York Outlet, Charlotte Russe, Express Factory Outlet, and a first-in-state The Limited Outlet had opened at Potomac Mills. Several other tenants were announced to debut, being Steve Madden, a Swarovski outlet concept for the holidays, A|X Armani Exchange, and a first-in-state Great American Cookies. A 78,000 sq ft (7,200 m^{2}) Gander Mountain store would open in late November 2014. In late May 2015, it was announced that Francesca's, rue21, Matchbox, and The North Face would debut at the mall throughout the summer and fall. Gander Mountain liquidated all of its stores in May 2017—including the Potomac Mills location—after filing for Chapter 11 bankruptcy.

==== Sign replacement ====
The Potomac Mills apple tree sign was damaged by high winds in 2011, and again in March 2018. The second incident bent and stressed its steel support poles, causing it to tilt precariously over Interstate 95, and forced the sign's dismantling. Near the end of March 2019, a new sign was unveiled, featuring an updated design.

After filing for Chapter 11 bankruptcy, Gymboree closed all remaining ≈540 Gymboree and Gymboree Outlet locations in early 2019, including the Potomac Mills location, though it would reopen in February 2020 inside The Children's Place, which acquired Gymboree. Throughout March and April 2019, Charlotte Russe also filed for Chapter 11 and closed all of its locations, which would be followed by Payless ShoeSource in late May 2019.

=== 2020–present ===
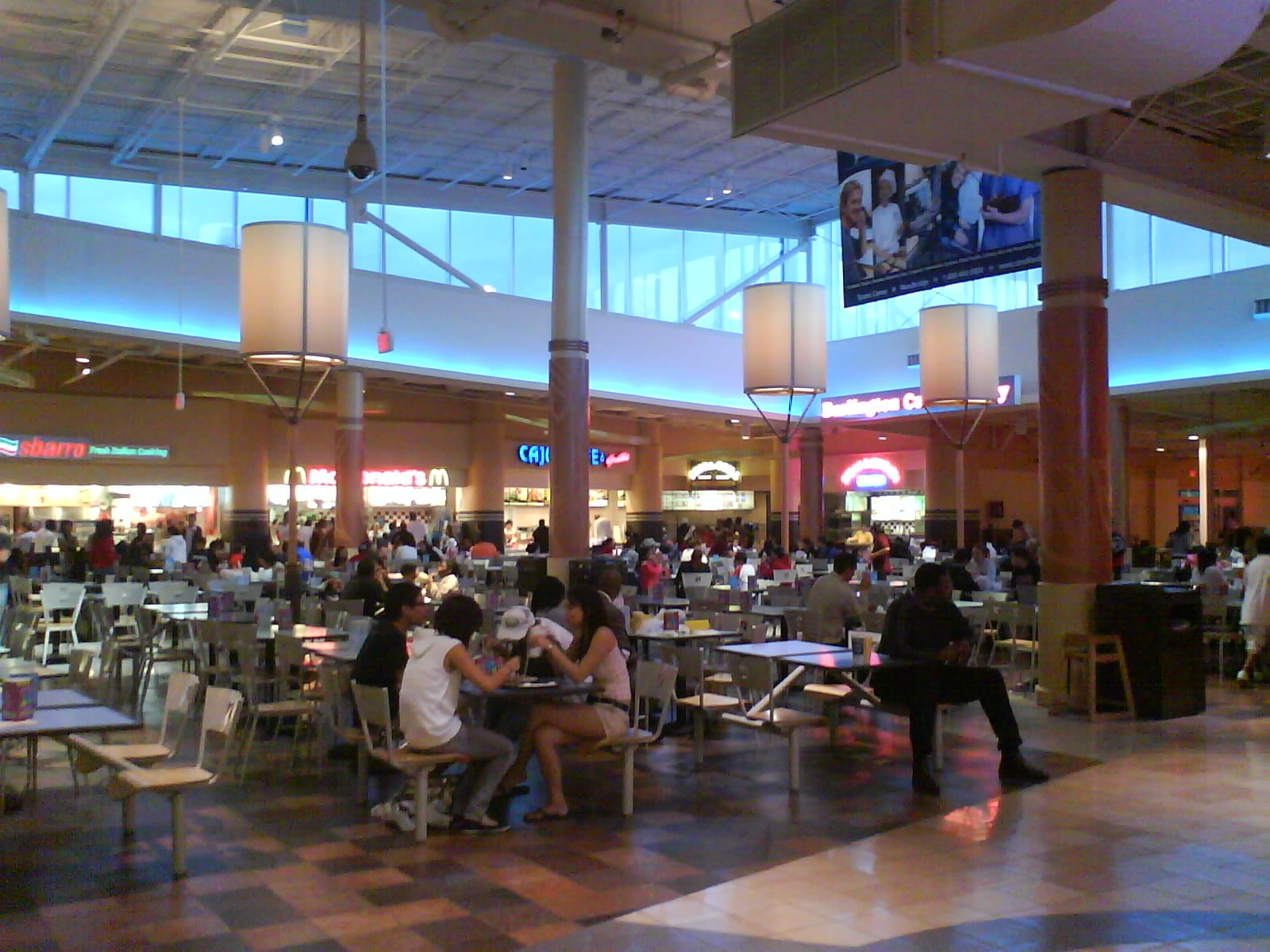
Food court pre-renovation (May 2008)

Potomac Mills, alongside other Simon properties, closed temporarily on March 17, 2020, due to the COVID-19 pandemic. The mall was originally going to reopen on March 30, but its closure was extended due to a stay-at-home order. Potomac Mills ultimately reopened on May 29, 2020, under strict social distancing guidelines.

Prince William County would acquire the former Gander Mountain building at auction in late March 2023 for $15.2 million, and announced that it would be redeveloped into a behavioral health center. On October 5, 2023, it was announced that the 40,766 sq ft (3,787.3 m^{2}) Saks Off 5th would be closing, with Primark filing building permits of over $1.7 million to take over the space.

In October 2024, Simon Property Group announced that Potomac Mills' food court would be renovated into a "food pavilion" branded as the Dining Pavilion at Potomac Mills. The renovation would add contemporary flooring and lighting, a new white-and-gray color palette, charging stations, and new seating. The architect for the renovation was Bartlett Hartley & Mulkey (BHM). Redevelopment on the former Gander Mountain space was announced on April 11, 2025 that it was delayed, as the building needed to meet stringent state behavioral health regulations, which took longer than initially budgeted. The Connections Prince William Crisis Receiving Center (CRC) ultimately opened on October 9, 2025.

Potomac Mills celebrated its 40th anniversary in September 2025. On April 17, 2026, Five Oaks Properties, LLC acquired the former Kaiser Permanente clinic at 14139 Potomac Mills Road for $5.5 million, which closed after Kaiser relocated to Minnieville Road. A redevelopment proposal, Potomac Lofts, with 130 condominiums, has been moving through local Prince William County review stages to add mixed-use housing to the area. The land would rezoned for residential use if approved. Slick City Action Park would open in 2026 in the former Buy Buy Baby anchor space.

== Gallery ==
Interior of JCPenney Outlet during liquidation (May 2011)

Costco entrance (August 2018)

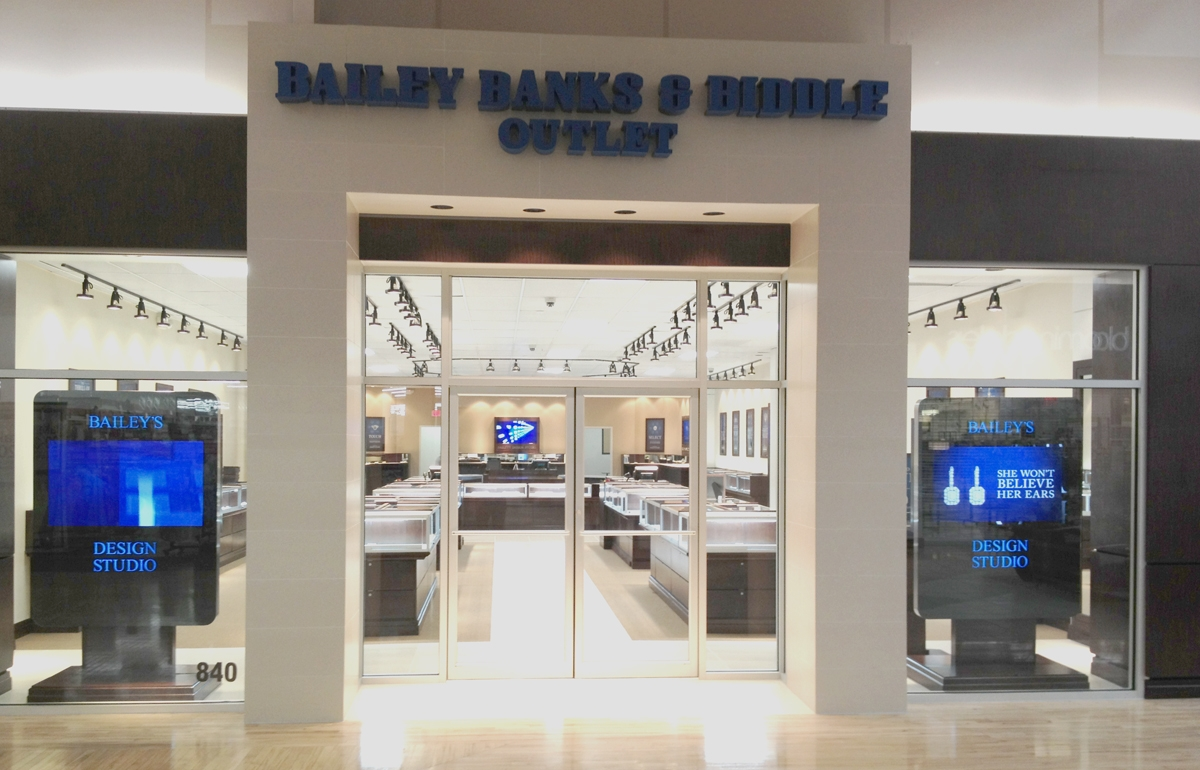
Bailey Banks & Biddle Outlet storefront (March 2012)

Build-A-Bear Workshop (August 2018)

Sbarro (August 2018)

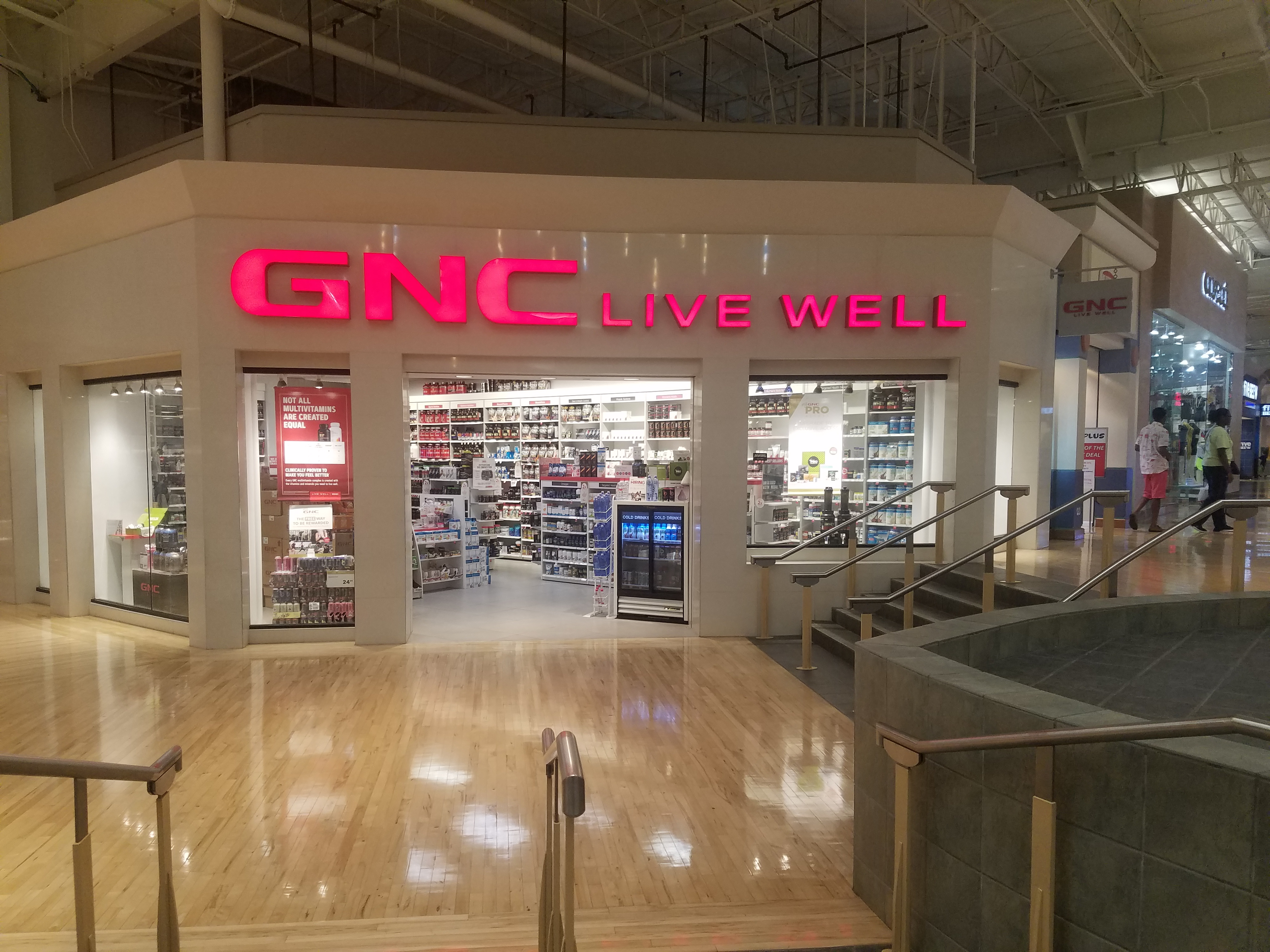
GNC entrance (August 2018)

== See also ==
- Arundel Mills
- Clarksburg Premium Outlets
