= Janie and Jack =

American children's clothing retailer

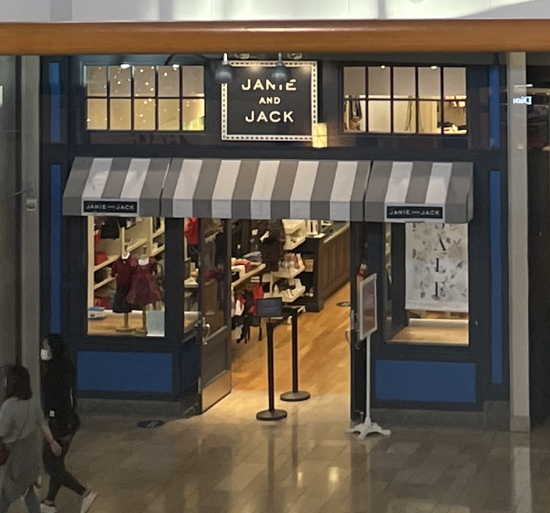
Janie and Jack location at Fashion Show Mall, Las Vegas Nevada

Janie and Jack is a children's clothing brand founded in 2002 in San Francisco, California. Their current product range includes clothing for newborns up to 24 months old, as well as boys and girls up to age 18. As of 2021, the brand currently operates 115 retail locations in the United States in addition to its online retail platform.

In addition to its independent locations, Janie and Jack products were also available as a clothing line through Gymboree until the retail corporation filed for Chapter 11 Bankruptcy protection in 2019. Janie and Jack was acquired shortly thereafter by Gap Inc. for US$35 Million. The remainder of the Gymboree brand was simultaneously acquired in March 2019 by American clothing retailer The Children's Place for US$76 Million. As of March 2021, Janie and Jack was sold to strategic investment firm Go Global Retail.

In February 2022, Janie and Jack debuted a collaboration with Kaavia James Union-Wade, the three-year-old daughter of retired NBA player Dwyane Wade and actress Gabrielle Union-Wade. The 41-piece collection ranged from $10.50 to US$74
