= Jane T. Elfers =

American retail executive

Jane T. Elfers is an American business executive who headed two large retail chains. She began her retail career at Macy's. She was chief executive officer of department store Lord & Taylor from 2000 to 2008 and was credited with its revitalization. She was unexpectedly forced out in a corporate reorganization. She was CEO and president of The Children's Place for 14 years, resigning by "mutual agreement" on May 20, 2024. The New York Times described her as "a blunt, forceful executive...one of the most admired figures in the New York fashion world."

She is a 1983 graduate of Bucknell University, and was a member of its board of trustees.
