= Bethel, Prince William County, Virginia =

Unincorporated community in Virginia, US

Coordinates: 38°39′19″N 77°18′25″W

Bethel is an unincorporated community in Prince William County, in the U.S. state of Virginia. Bethel is entirely encompassed by the CDP of Potomac Mills
