= Russell House and Store =

Coordinates: 38.653691°N 77.311600°W

Russell House and Store is a 19th-century historic general store building in Dale City, Virginia. A historical marker was erected at the house by the Hechinger Company in 1992, on behalf of the Prince William County Historical Commission.
