= Elizabeth Peet McIntosh =

American OSS officer and government official

- Born: Elizabeth Sebree Peet; March 1, 1915; Washington, D.C., United States
- Died: June 8, 2015 (aged 100); Lake Ridge, Virginia, United States
- Spouse(s): Alexander MacDonald (m. 1937–19??; divorced); Richard Heppner (m. 1946–1958; his death); Frederick McIntosh (m. 1962–2004; his death)

Elizabeth Peet McIntosh (born Elizabeth Sebree Peet; March 1, 1915 – June 8, 2015) was known for her undercover work during World War II for the OSS (forerunner of the CIA).

== Early life ==
She was the daughter of two reporters and raised in Honolulu, Hawaii. While in Hawaii, McIntosh studied and learned to speak Japanese. She attended the University of Washington and earned a degree in journalism in 1935. She married her first husband, Alexander MacDonald, in 1937. McIntosh was near the attack on Pearl Harbor while working as a correspondent for the Scripps Howard news service. She then returned to the Washington, D.C. area once World War II had begun in order to cover Eleanor Roosevelt and other government activities.

== Work in the OSS ==
In January 1943, she was asked to join the Office of Strategic Services because she had become fluent in Japanese. She was then sent to India in July 1944, where her main job was to intervene in the postcard communication that troops would send home to India while stationed in Japan. She became one of the few women assigned to Morale Operations, along with future chef Julia Child who she befriended, where she created "disinformation," or fake reports, documents and postcards, which would "undermine Japanese morale."

McIntosh also served with Detachment 202 in China, where she helped develop propaganda leaflets. While in China, one of her assignments was to help create a script for a popular Chinese fortune teller to read on the radio, with the goal of causing distress among the Chinese and Japanese who listened. The script said that "something terrible is going to happen to Japan. We have checked the stars and there is something we can't even mention because it is so dreadful and it is going to eradicate one whole area of Japan." Later that day, the US dropped the atom bomb on Hiroshima, something that McIntosh's team had not known about prior to writing the script.

During her career for the OSS, McIntosh delivered an explosive masquerading as a lump of coal – the device was dubbed "black Joe" – to a Chinese operative of the OSS. The agent took the dynamite aboard a train ferrying Japanese soldiers and waited for the opportune moment to toss it into the engine before jumping to safety. The train blew up as it crossed a bridge.

Recounting the story in 2011, she confessed to some initial guilt over the many deaths. But she quickly reconsidered, saying about the TNT, "I was just the one who handed it to the guy who did the job."

== Later life ==
McIntosh went on to work for the Joint Chiefs of Staff, Voice of America, the State Department, and the United Nations.

In 1958, McIntosh began working for the CIA and worked there until she retired in 1973.

She lived in a farmhouse outside of Leesburg, Virginia for much of the rest of her life, with her third husband, Fred McIntosh.

== Published works ==
After her time with the OSS, McIntosh published her memoir, Undercover Girl, in 1947. She wrote two children's books as well: Inki (later republished as Inky) and Palace Under the Sea." She also wrote Sisterhood of Spies: The Women of the OSS, first published in 1998. In 2012, McIntosh was honored as one of the Library of Virginia's "Virginia Women in History".

== Death ==
McIntosh died on June 8, 2015, in Lake Ridge, Virginia after a heart attack. She was 100 years old. She was the last surviving female member assigned to the Morale Operations Branch of the OSS in World War II.
