= Prince William Public Library System =

Prince William Public Library
- Location: US
- Established: 1965
- Branches: 12

Access and use
- Circulation: 3.6 million
- Population served: 468,131

Other information
- Website: Prince William Public Library

Prince William Public Library System (PWPLS) is a public library system in Virginia started in 1965. The system consists of 12 branches that include six community branches and six neighborhood branches across Prince William County and the cities of Manassas and Manassas Park.

PWPLS serves over 1.4 million visitors in their branches every year including over 1 million website users. In addition, the system provides more than 3.6 million materials borrowed every year to the residents of the Prince William area.

== Service area ==
According to the FY 2014 Institute of Museum and Library Services Data Catalog, the Library System has a service area population of 468,131 with 0 central library and 10 branch libraries.

== History ==
Prince William Public Library System first opened to the citizens of Prince William County in September 1965. The first branch, Leesylvania Branch Library, was opened on the first floor of the Prince William County Administration Building. By November 1972, legislation was passed to open Potomac Community Library on the grounds of Potomac Hospital.

On June 7, 2021, PWPLS opened Manassas City Library to serve the surrounding communities, making it the twelfth and newest library in the system.

== Branches ==
- Bull Run Regional Library (established 1994)
- Central Community Library (established 1971)
- Chinn Park Regional Library (established in 1991)
- Dale City Neighborhood Library (established 1986)
- Dumfries Neighborhood Library (established 1985)
- Haymarket Gainesville Community Library (established 2015)
- Independent Hill Neighborhood Library (established 1987)
- Lake Ridge Neighborhood Library (established 1985)
- Manassas City Library (established 2021)
- Montclair Community Library (established 2016)
- Nokesville Neighborhood Library (established 1986)
- Potomac Community Library (established 1975)
