= Gymboree =

American retail corporation

Gymboree Group, Inc.

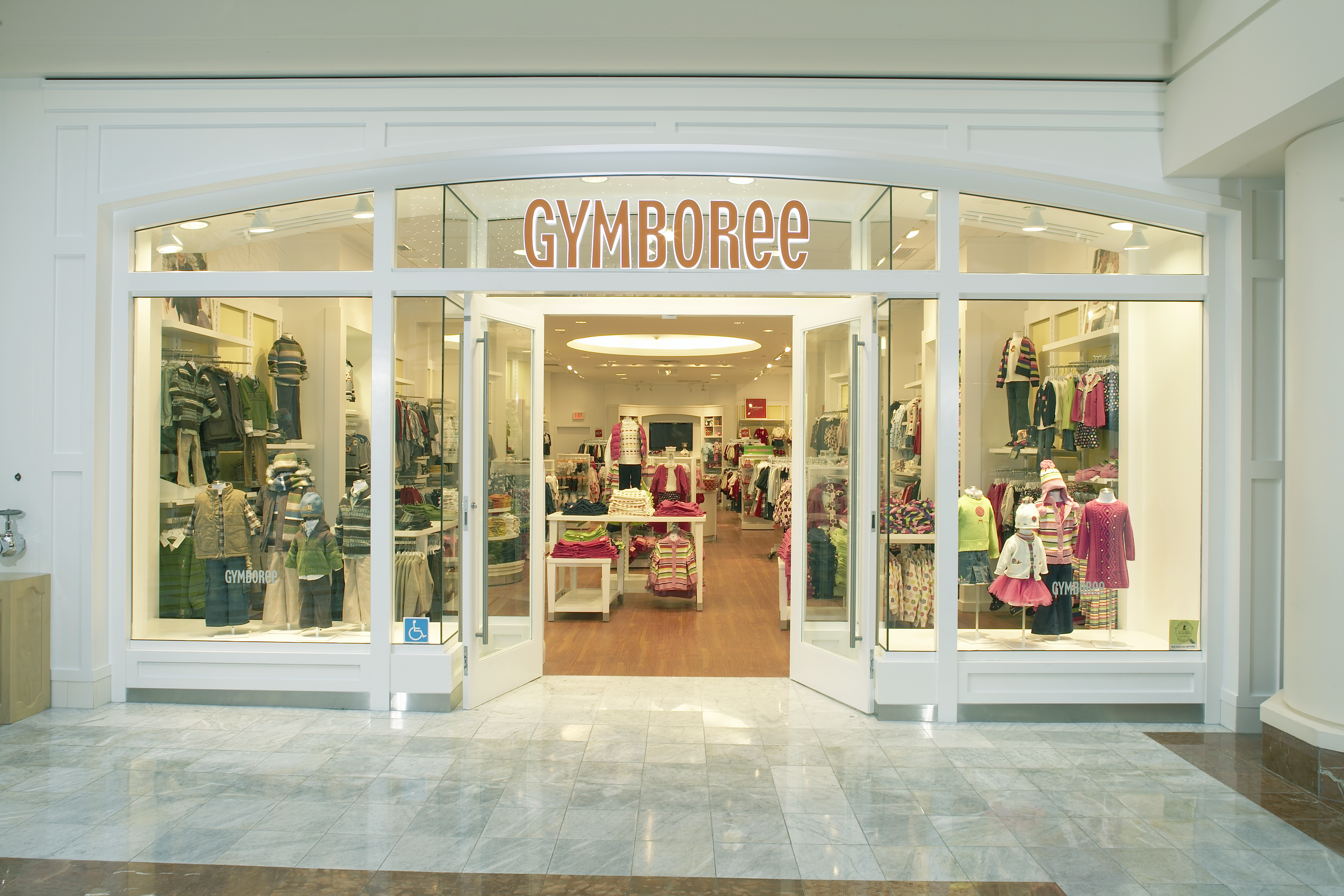
- A Modern Gymboree location
- Type: Subsidiary
- Industry: Retail (original), eCommerce Franchising
- Founded: 1976; 50 years ago
- Products: Children's clothes & Toys
- Parent: The Children's Place (2019–present)
- Website: www.gymboree.com

Gymboree is a sub brand of The Children's Place. Gymboree began with operating retail stores between the early 1970s and the later 2010s. It was founded by Joan Barnes.

== History ==
=== Early years ===
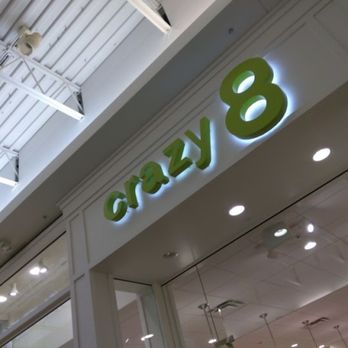
Crazy8 inside Southern Park Mall (Closed 2019)

In 1986, the company opened a chain of clothing stores named Gymboree. Gymboree stores offered coordinating children's clothing. The sizes ranged from newborn to size ten. As of January 2019, it operated 380 Gymboree stores, 154 Gymboree outlets, 147 Janie & Jack stores, 253 Crazy 8 stores, and 11 Crazy 8 outlets in the U.S. and Canada.

Crazy 8 was started in August 2007. It featured lower-priced clothing and was Gymboree's direct competitor for The Children's Place and Old Navy.

In 2010, Bain Capital acquired the company for US$1.8 billion.

=== Bankruptcy and liquidation ===
In June 2017, Gymboree announced it was filing for Chapter 11 bankruptcy protection. In September 2017, the company emerged from bankruptcy.

In November 2018, it was reported that Gymboree would file for bankruptcy for the second time in 14 months, and as a result, Gymboree announced plans to discontinue the Crazy 8 brand after the holiday season.

On January 17, 2019, Gymboree filed for Chapter 11 bankruptcy protection, and eliminated all Gymboree, Gymboree Outlet, and Crazy 8 brick-and-mortar formats as a result. The company sold its Janie & Jack brand to Gap, Inc.

=== Play & Music Centers ===
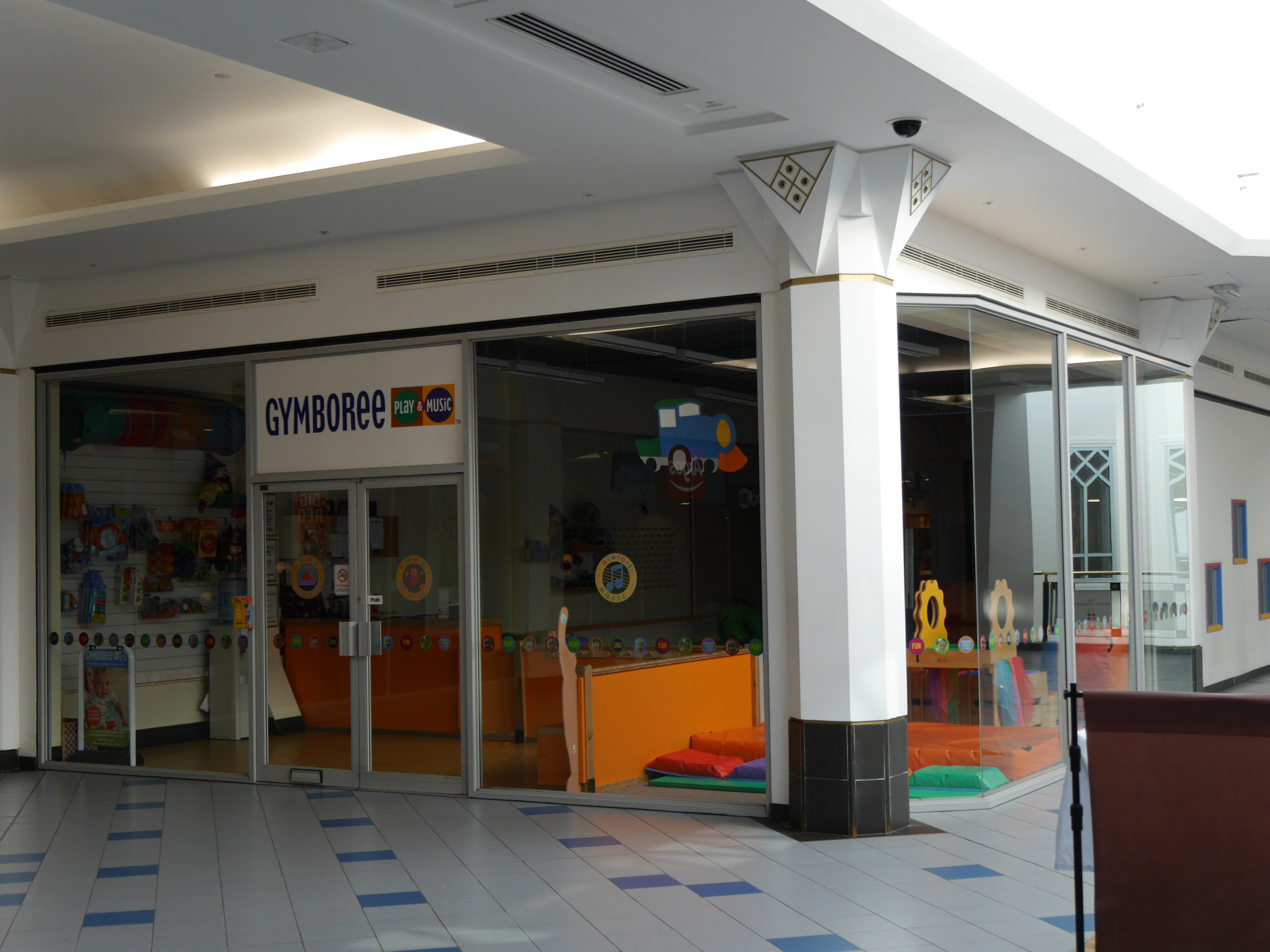
Gymboree Play & Music in London

In July 2016, The Gymboree Corporation sold the Gymboree Play & Music business to Zeavion Holding, a private company with a focus on the education and entertainment sectors. Gymboree Play & Music is now completely separate from the Gymboree Corporation and is operating parent-child play classes for ages 0–5. As of 2023, Play & Music operates in over 40 countries, and has more than 733 centers internationally.

=== Subbrand ===
On June 24, 2019, Gymboree and Crazy 8's assets were acquired by The Children's Place, who announced that the former would become a digitally native sub brand with store-within-a-store locations at The Children's Place stores. It was announced on January 30, 2020, that The Children's Place would debut Gymboree in February that year, featuring an "early access" program that would allow early access to the first 10,000 customers who register a spot.

On November 2, 2026, The Children's Place warned that it would be preparing to file for Chapter 11 bankruptcy protection within one week, and proposed a court-supervised sale of all of its assets, which would either keep the company operating or liquidate it. Liquidation sales began at all of its locations and its website shortly thereafter. On November 5, the company announced the closure of its Fort Payne distribution center, which will close on January 5, 2027. On November 8, The Children's Place filed for Chapter 11 bankruptcy in New Jersey, listing assets and liabilities between $500 million and $1 billion.

== Lawsuits ==
In November 2005, Gymboree settled a lawsuit relating to overtime compensation in Riverside, California for $2.3 million. The lawsuit alleged that Gymboree did not pay mandatory overtime or provide required meal breaks.
