= The Children's Place =

American children's clothing retailer

The Children's Place Inc.

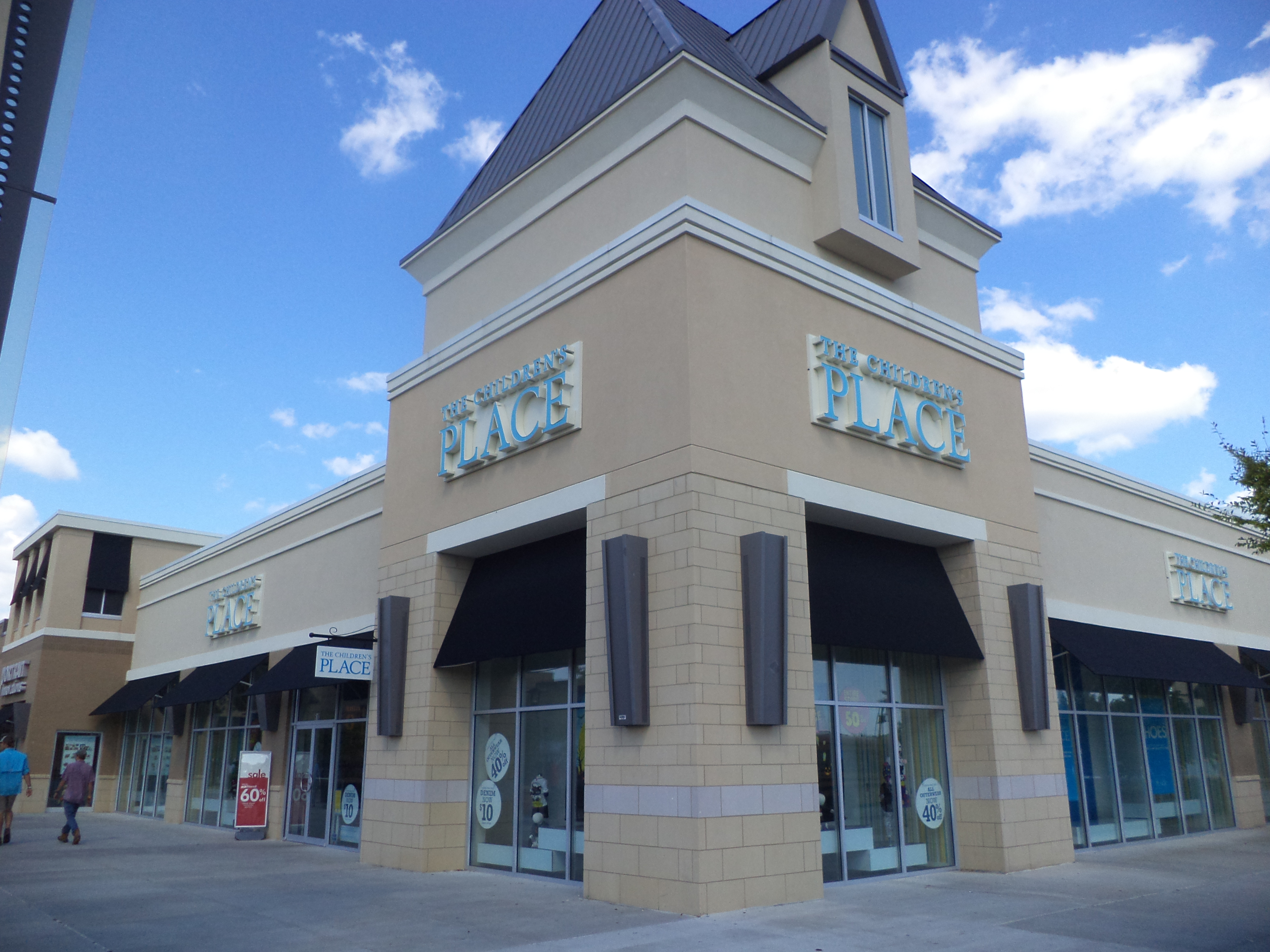
- The Children's Place in Valdosta, Georgia
- Type: Public
- Traded as: Nasdaq: PLCE
- Industry: Apparel
- Founded: 1969; 57 years ago
- Founders: David Pulver; Clinton Clark
- Fate: Chapter 11 bankruptcy
- Headquarters: Secaucus, New Jersey, U.S.
- Number of locations: about 525
- Area served: Worldwide
- Key people: Turki S. AlRajhi (chairman)
- Products: Children's apparel and accessories
- Revenue: ▼US$1.602billion (2024)
- Operating income: ▼US$83.7 million (2024)
- Net income: ▼US$154.5 million (2024)
- Total assets: ▼US$800.3 million (2024)
- Total equity: ▼US$9 million (2024)
- Number of employees: 3,300 (2023)
- Subsidiaries: Gymboree
- Website: www.childrensplace.com

The Children's Place Inc. is an American retailer of clothing for children. It sells its products primarily under its proprietary brands The Children's Place, Gymboree, Sugar & Jade, PJ Place and Crazy 8. As of November 2024, the company had about 525 stores in the U.S., Canada and Puerto Rico, and also sells via two online outlets and through five franchise partners in 15 countries. Its product line includes tops, skirts, dresses, jackets, shoes, bottoms, sleepwear and backpacks. The Children's Place is headquartered in Secaucus, New Jersey.

== History ==
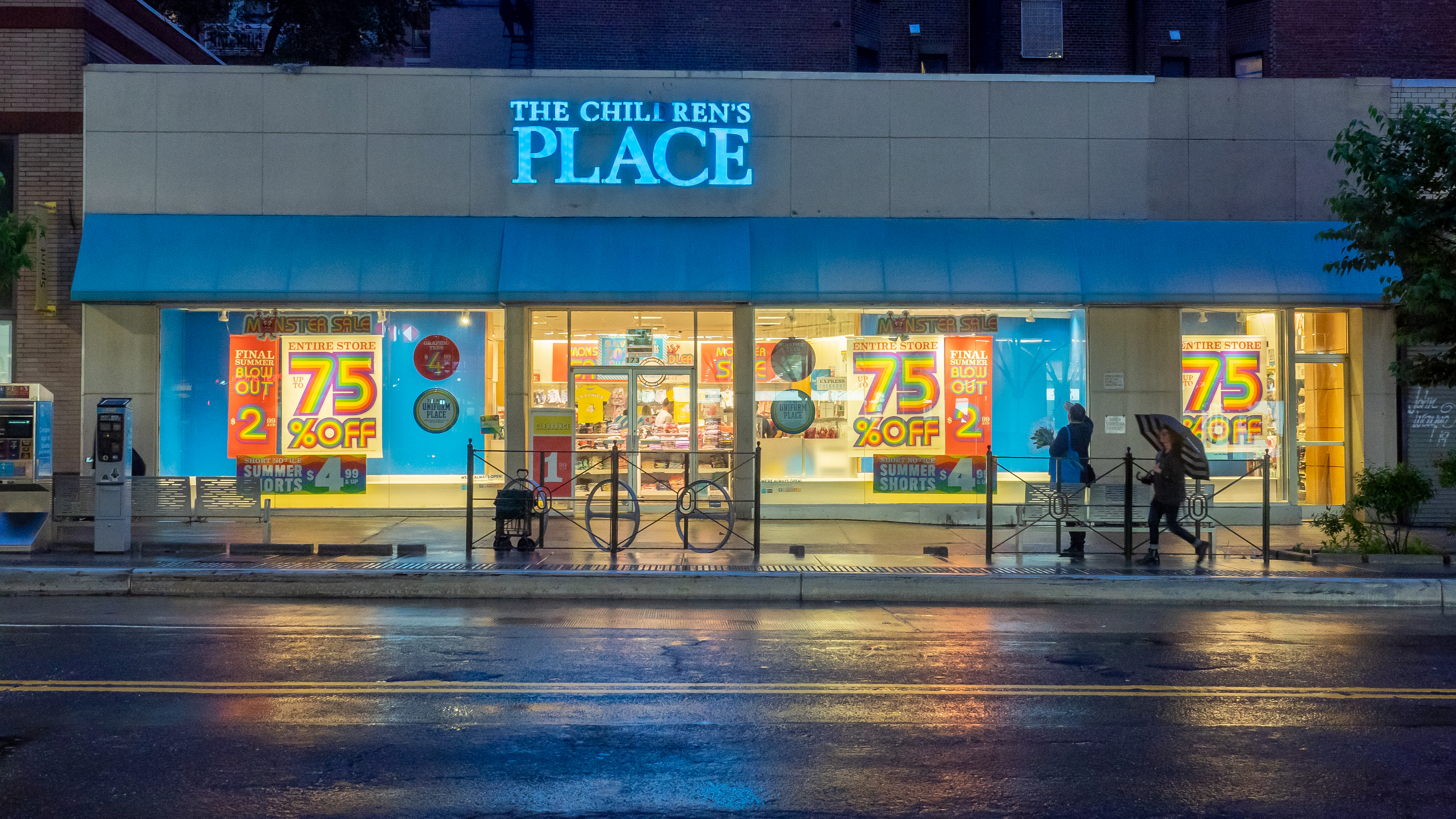
The Children's Place in Manhattan

The company was founded in 1969. It was acquired by Federated Department Stores (now Macy's, Inc.) in 1981. After Campeau Corporation acquired Federated, they sold The Children's Place to a group led by Joseph Sitt in 1988. They became publicly traded on the Nasdaq exchange in 1997, under the ticker symbol PLCE.

The Children's Place had a location in the mall in New York's World Trade Center. This location was destroyed during the September 11 attacks in 2001.

Between 2004 and 2007, the company owned and operated 335 Disney Stores through a subsidiary Hoop Holdings/Hoop Retail Stores LLC. Disney sold the chain for the cost of inventory to Children's Place subsidiary Hoop Holdings, with a 15-year licensing agreement. Mario Ciampi, senior vice president of store development and logistics, was named Hoop/Disney Store North America president. The company agreed to spend $100 million in operation upgrades and remodeling. Under the licensing agreement, a "royalty holiday" period existed until October 2006, to allow remodeling the stores. The royalty thereafter was 5% of store sales, while online sales had a 9% to 10% royalty for Disney. Hoop Holdings was able to withdraw $48 million of the equipment and property received in the purchase.

Hoops had progress with its strategy as the stores in 2006 for 11 months had a 15% increase in sales assisted by successful Disney box office results and the Disney Channel television movie High School Musical. A store website was launched in April 2007.

In June 2007, the company began negotiations to sell the rights back to The Walt Disney Company. On March 26, 2008, Hoop Holdings/Hoop Retail Stores LLC and related subsidiaries of TCP that operated Disney Store retail locations filed for bankruptcy. Hoop obtained from Wells Fargo $35 million of debtor-in-possession financing and appointed Perry Mandarino of Traxi LLC, a Manhattan-based financial-restructuring company, as chief restructuring officer. On May 1, 2008, 231 Disney Stores in North America reverted to being properties of Disney, operating under the Disney Consumer Products arm.

On December 11, 2009, The Children's Place announced the appointment of former Lord & Taylor CEO Jane T. Elfers as president and chief executive officer (CEO) of the company, effective January 4, 2010.

In the summer of 2013, the store withdrew a T-shirt from the stores with four options for "My best subjects" including "Shopping, Music, Dance and Math". While shopping, music, and dance were marked, math was left unmarked because the T-shirt stated "Nobody's perfect!".

Mithaq Capital of Saudi Arabia acquired a majority stake in The Children's Place in February 2024, after the company said it was experiencing liquidity problems.

The Children's Place announced a financing agreement with Mithaq to provide $78.6 million of interest-free, unsecured and subordinated term loans to strengthen the company's liquidity position.

In April 2024, the company announced $90 million in new unsecured financing provided by Mithaq.

Elfers resigned as CEO on May 20, 2024, receiving a $3.75 million payout to leave the company.

Turki S. AlRajhi, Chairman and CEO of Mithaq and Chairman of The Children's Place, outlined background and strategy for The Children's Place in a letter to the company's shareholders on May 24, 2024.

The Children's Place opened its first Gymboree store at Westfield Garden State Plaza in Paramus, New Jersey on November 20, 2024.

On November 2, 2026, The Children's Place stated that it would be preparing to file for Chapter 11 bankruptcy protection within one week, and proposed a court-supervised sale of all of its assets, which would either continue operating the company or liquidate it. Liquidation sales began at all of its locations and its website shortly thereafter. On November 5, the company announced the closure of its Fort Payne, Alabama distribution center, which will close on January 5, 2027. On November 8, The Children's Place filed for Chapter 11 bankruptcy in New Jersey, listing assets and liabilities between $500 million and $1 billion.

== Operations ==
Most of The Children's Place stores are located in and around regional malls, but also include some strip shopping centers, outlets, and street stores. The majority of their stores are small, traditional mall stores, although some Children's Place outlets are in a big box format.
