= Sentara Northern Virginia Medical Center =

Community hospital serving Prince William County, Virginia

- Sentara Healthcare
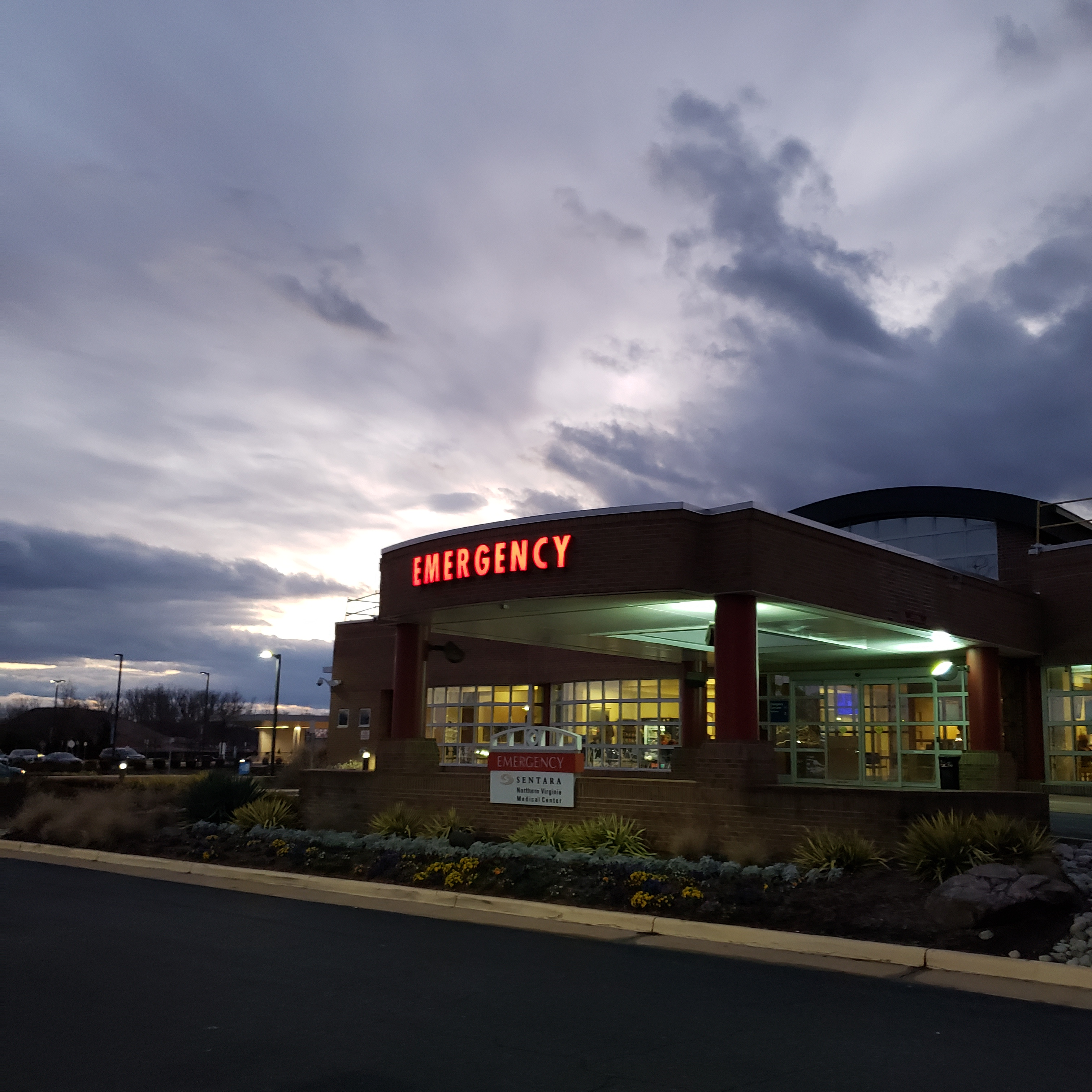

Geography
- Location: Prince William County, Virginia, United States
- Coordinates: 38.637033°N 77.285847°W

Services
- Beds: 183

History
- Opened: 1972

Links
- Website: www.sentara.com
- Lists: Hospitals in Virginia

Sentara Northern Virginia Medical Center (SNVMC) is a 183-bed, not-for-profit community hospital serving Prince William County and its surrounding communities. Potomac Hospital, an independent, non-profit community hospital, merged with Sentara Healthcare in December 2009 and is now known as Sentara Northern Virginia Medical Center (from April 16, 2012). The SNVMC market has experienced tremendous growth since the opening of the hospital in 1972.

== History ==
In 1972, after an eight-year community fundraising effort, Potomac Hospital opened its doors to the residents of eastern Prince William, southern Fairfax and north Stafford Counties. Potomac has come a long way since then, growing from 29 patient beds, 115 employees and 61 physicians to 183 patient beds, more than 1000 employees and more than 250 medical staff members.

Before Potomac Hospital opened, there was no civilian hospital between Fredericksburg and Alexandria. Residents of eastern Prince William County knew that building their own hospital would cut travel time for medical care by 30 to 45 minutes. In 1965 the Woodbridge Jaycees hired professional consultants to study the feasibility of building a hospital in the area. Architects were hired and at least five sites were surveyed to determine the hospital's location.

In June 1968, community leaders joined to form the Potomac Hospital Corporation and elected John Johnson, then head of Virginia Power, as president. In 1969 the first hospital membership drive began and soon there were 3,300 members ready and willing to support the hospital's fundraising efforts. The result was that over $2 million was raised by the community to help build and open Potomac Hospital.

The Board of Directors hired as the first hospital administrator, L.E. Richardson Jr. Richardson had recently retired from the U.S. Navy's Medical Service Corp. His last duty station was at the Naval Hospital of Quantico Marine Corps base, when the hospital was still a full service institution for the U.S. Marines. Richardson took the new Potomac Hospital through its original construction, opening and first expansion, serving as administrator for the first ten years.

Potomac Hospital merged with Sentara Healthcare in December 2009 and is now known as Sentara Northern Virginia Medical Center.

== Hospital-based patient care services ==
- Four-story, inpatient facility opened in March 2006 and features all private patient rooms
- 16-bed Intensive Care Unit with 24 hour Intensivist Physician coverage, 16-bed Intermediate Care and 50-bed Cardiac Telemetry Unit
- 24-bed Surgical/Orthopedic/Bariatric Unit provides pre- and post-operative care
- Medicine/Hematology/Oncology/Hospice Units include a 34-bed Medical Unit, a 12-bed Hematology/Oncology Unit, a dedicated Hospice Suite (featuring four private patient rooms and family support area), a four-bed inpatient dialysis suite and a six-bay outpatient infusion center
- Women's & Children's Services include nine LDRs, two ORs, a 16-bassinet nursery and a level II Neonatal ICU with 24-hour neonatology coverage. Facilities include a private perinatal assessment suite, two L&D triage and two observation rooms, private postpartum rooms, and a specially designed pediatric unit.
- The Irene V. Hylton Emergency Care Center is staffed by an emergency medicine physician group and has approximately 60,000 annual visits. It has a stat lab, dedicated X-ray, and 42 private exam rooms.
- SNVMC Surgical Services is supported by da Vinici (Rights reserved) Robotic-Assisted Technology and offers a full scope of services. Century Surgical Services is in the Century Medical Building on the campus of SNVMC and houses operating rooms and a special procedure room.
- Potomac Center Outpatient Services provides Endoscopy Services and the Wound Healing Center
- The Outpatient Diabetes Management Program, staffed by certified diabetes educators and other trained healthcare professionals, offers individual counseling, gestational counseling, group classes, a monthly support group and an annual Diabetes Fair. The program is recognized by the American Association of Diabetes Educators (AADE) for quality patient education.
- The Care Coordination Department, staffed by registered nurses and social workers, provides assessment of the immediate needs of patients and their families, initiates discharge plans at admission to assess, plan, implement, coordinate, monitor, and evaluate the options and services to meet individuals' health needs
