= Lake Ridge, Virginia =

Census-designated place in the United States

- Census-designated place (CDP)
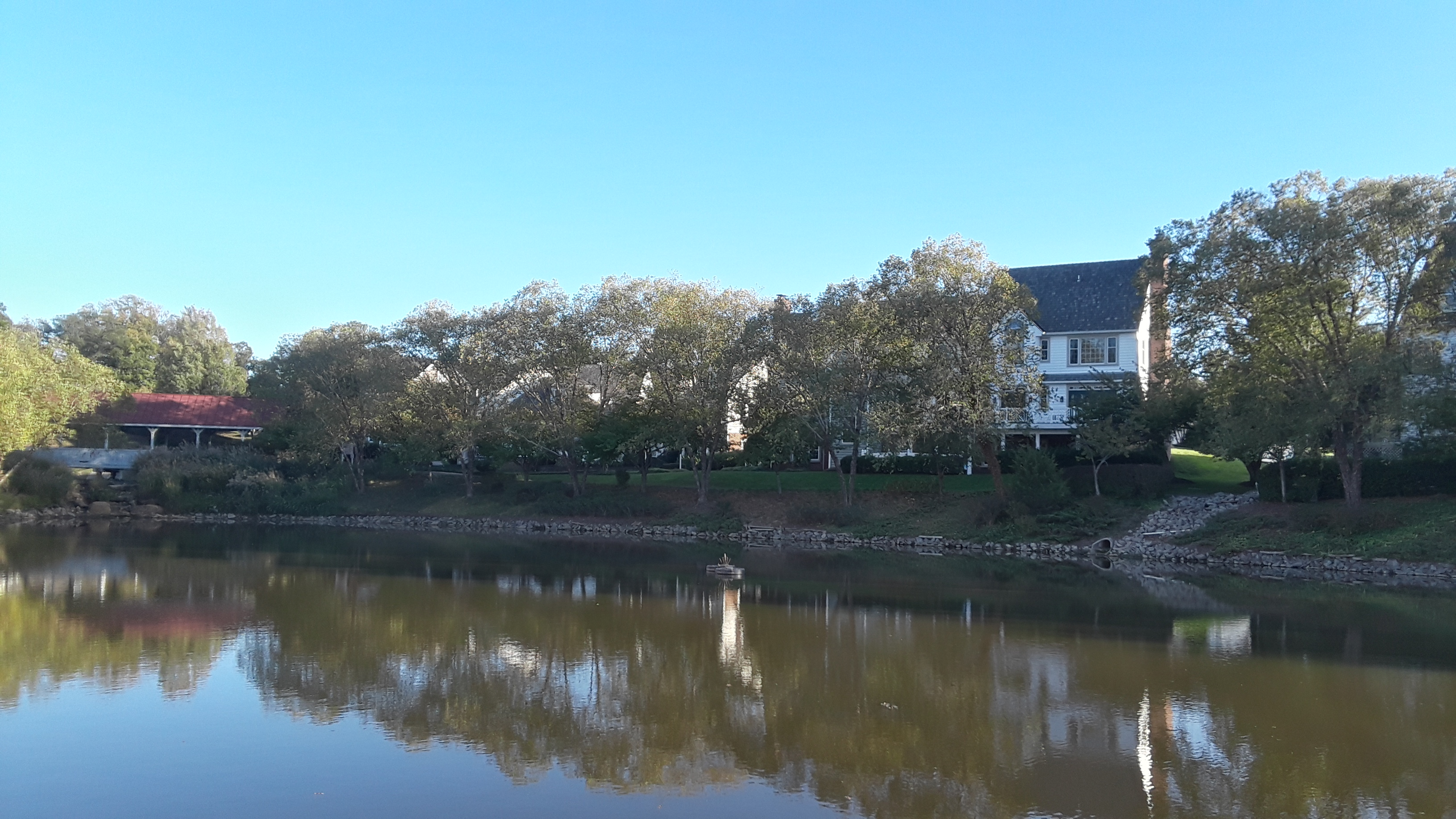
- Houses near Tackett's Mill Shopping Center, October 2021

- Location in Prince William County and the state of Virginia.
- Coordinates: 38°41′17″N 77°18′32″W
- Country: United States
- State: Virginia
- County: Prince William

Area
  - Total: 8.6 sq mi (22.4 km^{2})
  - Land: 8.2 sq mi (21.3 km^{2})
  - Water: 0.39 sq mi (1.0 km^{2})
- Elevation: 279 ft (85 m)

Population (2010)
  - Total: 41,058
  - Density: 4,990/sq mi (1,930/km^{2})
- Time zone: UTC−5 (Eastern (EST))
  - Summer (DST): UTC−4 (EDT)
- ZIP code: 22192
- Area codes: 571, 703
- FIPS code: 51-43432
- GNIS feature ID: 1867592

Lake Ridge is a census-designated place (CDP) in Prince William County, Virginia, United States. It is an annex of Woodbridge. As of the 2020 census, Lake Ridge had a population of 46,162.

== History ==
Lake Ridge was started in the late 1960s when Sorensen Construction Corporation began building in the area now known as East Lake Ridge.

By 1969, the first five developments had begun, named Thousand Oaks, The Point, Plantation Harbor, The Village of Lake Ridge, and The Hamlet.

Lake Ridge Parks and Recreation was formed in 1972 as the HOA for the area. The community grew rapidly throughout the 1970s and 1980s from about 3,350 homes in 1983 to approximately 6,600 in 1990. Lake Ridge as it is now was completed in the late 1990s with the completion of Ridgeleigh. Lake Ridge has about 7,700 housing units, in more than 70 subdivisions and nine condominium complexes. Most of the houses were built after 1972.

== Geography ==
Lake Ridge is at 38°41′17″N 77°18′32″W (38.688190, −77.308953), along Old Bridge Road between Harbor Drive and Westridge Drive.

According to the United States Census Bureau, the CDP has a total area of 8.6 square miles (22.4 km^{2}), of which 8.2 square miles (21.3 km^{2}) is land and 0.4 square mile (1.0 km^{2}) (4.63%) is water.

== Demographics ==
=== 2020 census ===
As of the 2020 census, Lake Ridge had a population of 46,162. The median age was 36.9 years. 26.1% of residents were under the age of 18 and 12.0% of residents were 65 years of age or older. For every 100 females there were 92.1 males, and for every 100 females age 18 and over there were 88.3 males age 18 and over.

100.0% of residents lived in urban areas, while 0.0% lived in rural areas.

There were 16,134 households in Lake Ridge, of which 39.8% had children under the age of 18 living in them. Of all households, 53.8% were married-couple households, 14.7% were households with a male householder and no spouse or partner present, and 26.7% were households with a female householder and no spouse or partner present. About 21.2% of all households were made up of individuals and 7.2% had someone living alone who was 65 years of age or older.

There were 16,505 housing units, of which 2.2% were vacant. The homeowner vacancy rate was 0.7% and the rental vacancy rate was 3.5%.

Racial composition as of the 2020 census
Race	Number	Percent
White	20,817	45.1%
Black or African American	9,962	21.6%
American Indian and Alaska Native	257	0.6%
Asian	4,627	10.0%
Native Hawaiian and Other Pacific Islander	64	0.1%
Some other race	4,329	9.4%
Two or more races	6,106	13.2%
Hispanic or Latino (of any race)	9,148	19.8%

=== 2007 estimates ===
According to a 2007 estimate, the median household income was $93,430, and the median family income was $103,310. Males had a median income of $55,182 versus $36,726 for females. The per capita income for the CDP was $30,506. About 1.7% of families and 2.3% of the population were below the poverty line, including 2.5% of those under age 18 and 2.3% of those age 65 or over.

=== 2000 census ===
As of the 2000 census, there were 30,404 people, 10,980 households, and 8,103 families in the CDP. The population density was 3,689.9 inhabitants per square mile (1,424.7/km^{2}). There were 11,265 housing units, at an average density of 1,367.1 per square mile (527.8/km^{2}). The racial makeup of the CDP was 74.38% White, 16.02% African American, 0.24% Native American, 3.53% Asian, 0.13% Pacific Islander, 2.20% from other races, and 3.50% from two or more races. Hispanics and Latinos of any race were 7.11%.

Of the 10,980 households, 42.6% had children under the age of 18 living with them, 58.9% were married couples living together, 11.4% had a female householder with no husband present, and 26.2% were non-families. 20.1% of households were one person and 4.0% were one person aged 65 or older. The average household size was 2.76 and the average family size was 3.21.

The age distribution was 29.5% under the age of 18, 7.5% from 18 to 24, 34.4% from 25 to 44, 23.6% from 45 to 64, and 5.0% 65 or older. The median age was 34 years. For every 100 females, there were 92.4 males. For every 100 females aged 18 and over, there were 88.4 males.

Residents of Lake Ridge and West Ridge are represented in Virginia's House of Delegates by Briana Sewell.

== Recreation ==
There is a yard sale and festival each fall.

== Notable person ==
- Elizabeth Peet McIntosh, OSS agent in WWII
