= Belmont Bay, Woodbridge =

Planned community in Woodbridge, Virginia, United States

Belmont Bay
- Planned community
- Interactive map of Belmont Bay
- Coordinates: 38.6583°N 77.2382°W
- Country: United States
- State: Virginia
- County: Prince William County
- CDP: Woodbridge
- Named after: Belmont Bay
- Website: Belmont Bay official website

Belmont Bay is a planned community in northeastern Woodbridge, Virginia, United States along the Occoquan River at Belmont Bay developed by Caruthers Companies.

== History ==
The overall property of Belmont Bay stretches from Woodbridge station southeast to the Occoquan Bay National Wildlife Refuge, and is bordered to the east by the Occoquan River and Belmont Bay and to the west by other residential properties. This property was conceived in the 1980s as a gated community with an elementary school on land purchased by Preston Caruthers. The community is no longer gated and has slowly developed since and will be fully-completed in the 2030s.

In July 2021, Caruthers Companies submitted a US$550 million plan for the final phase of the Belmont Bay development project, located on a vacant field at the Occoquan River waterfront. This mixed-use area project designed by Massachusetts-based design firm Sasaki includes 749 owner-occupied high-density homes, 641 apartment units, a freestanding restaurant, retail space, and a plaza. This is a revision of the initial plans for development in this lot, which originally included 411 age-restricted homes, 505 hotel rooms, and 1.42 million square feet of retail space. Construction will begin in 2022 and continue over the next years from then.

== Recreation ==
The Occoquan Bay National Wildlife Refuge, which is located at Belmont Bay, Occoquan Bay, and Marumsco Creek, is located just south of the community of Belmont Bay and is accessible via Dawson Beach Road.

=== The Osprey's Golf Club ===
A golf course called The Osprey's Golf Club opened in 1997 as an amenity for residents of the newly developed Belmont Bay neighborhood. However, it later closed 18 years later on November 29, 2015, as it never made revenue for the developers, who said; "We've been supporting all of these losses over the years with sales of real estate to subsidize to keep the golf course open... the revenue is just not there. The sound business decision would have been to close it down years ago." Subsequent to the closure, the golf course was converted to a park and renamed The Osprey's at Belmont Bay.

In 2019 as part of the North Woodbridge development project, the former golf course's open areas were considered to be converted to a disc golf course, however it was said in 2021 by Jay Sotos, development director for the project, that the developers of Belmont Bay proposed these open areas to remain as passive recreational areas and will be restored by reforestation and replanting native meadows.

== Transportation ==
Belmont Bay is accessible by boat via the Belmont Bay Harbor marina, which has a boat refueling station and is located along the banks of the Occoquan River. Northeast of the community is Woodbridge station, located off U.S. Route 1, which serves Amtrak's Northeast Regional line and Virginia Railway Express's Fredericksburg Line. The Potomac and Rappahannock Transportation Commission operates buses to the train station.

In 2018, a fast ferry proposal administered by the Northern Virginia Regional Commission and presented by the Potomac and Rappahannock Transportation Commission which will connect with places to the north such as Washington, District of Columbia and National Harbor, Maryland and will have its southern terminus at Belmont Bay went forward with further development.

== Education ==
Located within Belmont Bay is the George Mason University Potomac Science Center, a US$32 million 50,000 square foot academic and research center which opened on April 12, 2018.

Belmont Elementary School serves the community.
