= Waterfall (disambiguation) =

A waterfall is a place where water flows over a vertical drop in the course of a river.

Waterfall may also refer to:

== Places ==
- Waterfall, New South Wales, Australia
- Waterfall, Ontario, Canada
- Waterfall, County Cork, Ireland
- Waterfall, KwaZulu-Natal, South Africa
- Waterfall, Alaska, United States
- Waterfall, Virginia, United States
- Waterfall Village, Pentecost Island, Vanuatu
- Waterfalls, Harare, Zimbabwe
- Waterfall station (disambiguation), several railway stations

== Business and finance ==
- Waterfall model, in project management for business and software
- Cash flow waterfall, a securitization arrangement in finance
- Distribution waterfall, the process by which returned capital is distributed in private equity and real estate funds

== Infographics and visualization ==
- Waterfall display or spectrogram, to visualize sonar operation, animal calls, and other sounds
- Waterfall display (hardware), used in smartphones
- Waterfall chart, a kind of floating column bar chart
- Waterfall plot, a 3D plot of the information on a spectrogram, resembling mountain ranges

== Arts and entertainment ==
- Waterfall (M. C. Escher), a 1961 paradoxical lithograph print by Escher
- Waterfall furniture, a design style closely related to Art Deco

=== Music ===
==== Albums ====
- Waterfall (If album), 1972
- Waterfall (B.I album), 2021
- Waterfalls (album), a 1972 album by John Klemmer
- Waterfall, a 1994 album by Atlantic Ocean

==== Songs ====
- "Waterfall" (Carly Simon song), 1975
- "Waterfall" (James song), 2008
- "Waterfall" (Sopho Gelovani & Nodiko Tatishvili song), 2013
- "Waterfall" (Stargate song), 2017
- "Waterfall" (The Stone Roses song), 1991
- "Waterfalls" (James Hype song), 2025
- "Waterfalls" (Paul McCartney song), 1980
- "Waterfalls" (Timomatic song), 2013
- "Waterfalls" (TLC song), 1995
- "Waterfall", by 10cc, 1972
- "Waterfall", by Adler from Back from the Dead
- "Waterfall", by Atlantic Ocean, 1993
- "Waterfall", by Charli XCX from XCX World
- "Waterfall", by Electric Light Orchestra from Face the Music
- "Waterfall", by Feeder from Polythene, 1997
- "Waterfall", by Gabry Ponte from his eponymous album, 2002
- "Waterfall", by Gavin DeGraw from Free, 2009
- "Waterfall", by Heavenstamp, 2011
- "Waterfall", by Jon Schmidt
- "Waterfall", by Joy and the Boy from Paradise
- "Waterfall", by Kim Waters from Someone to Love You
- "Waterfall", by Toby Fox, a track from the soundtrack of the 2015 video game Undertale
- "Waterfall", by Wendy & Lisa from Wendy and Lisa
- "May This Be Love", also known as "Waterfall", by The Jimi Hendrix Experience from Are You Experienced
- "Waterfalls", by Doda from Aquaria, 2022
- Étude Op. 10, No. 1 (Chopin), the Waterfall Etude
- "Waterfall", by Park Bo-gum, 2025

== People ==
- Arnold C. Waterfall (1914–1990), British philatelist
- Linda Waterfall (1949–2019), American folk musician and singer-songwriter
- Luke Waterfall (born 1990), English footballer

== Other uses ==
- Operation Waterfall, a World War II Allied deception
- Waterfall bong, a type of bong used to smoke marijuana

== See also ==
- Falling water (disambiguation)
- Vattenfall, a Swedish power company
- Wasserfall, a World War II guided surface-to-air missile
- Waterval, a residential township in South Africa
