= The Waterfall =

The Waterfall may refer to:

- The Waterfall (album), a 2015 album by American rock band My Morning Jacket
- The Waterfall (film), a 2001 Turkish comedy-drama film, written and directed by Semir Aslanyürek
- The Waterfall (novel), a 1969 novel by British novelist Margaret Drabble

== See also ==
- Waterfall (disambiguation)
