= Dry falls =

Dry falls is a waterfall that is no longer supplied with water; a cliff-face that used to be a waterfall.

Dry Falls may refer to:

- Dry Falls, Channeled Scablands, Grant County, Washington, United States
  - Sun Lakes-Dry Falls State Park, Channeled Scablands, Grant County, Washington, United States
- Dry Falls (Macon County), North Carolina, United States; a wet waterfall in the Nantahala National Forest on the Cullasaja River; a.k.a. Upper Cullasaja Falls
- Dry Falls Dam, Grand Coulee canyon, Grant County, Washington, United States; an impoundment dam filled by water pumped from the Columbia river into the formerly dry canyon; a.k.a. South Coulee Dam

== See also ==
- Waterfall (disambiguation)
- Cliff (disambiguation)
- Falls (disambiguation)
