= Agnewville, Virginia =

- Extinct unincorporated community
- Location within Virginia Location within the United States
- Coordinates: 38°40′9″N 77°17′9″W
- Country: United States
- State: Virginia
- County: Prince William
- Established: 1889
- Founder: The Chinn Family

Area
  - Total: 0.781 sq mi (2.023 km^{2})
- Time zone: UTC−5 (Eastern (EST))
  - Summer (DST): UTC−4 (EDT)

Agnewville also known as Smoketown or Chinntown is an extinct unincorporated community in Prince William County, Virginia, United States. Agnewville lies to the west of the town of Occoquan at the intersection of Minnieville (formerly Davis Ford) and Telegraph Roads. It has also been known as Agnesville and Chinn Town.

Agnewville ran along Minnieville Road from Old Bridge Road to the old Horner Road (near the current Caton Hill Road). Agnewville flourished from 1890 to 1927.

== History ==
The land that became Agnewville was purchased and settled by freed slaves. The Chinn family, freed by Henny Fielder Roe after the Civil War, was given enough money to purchase about 500 acres of land in 1889.<

The U.S. Post Office in Agnewville was established in 1891, and was closed in March 1927, with the mail services transferred to the Woodbridge Post Office.

The Mount Olive Baptist Church was founded in 1915 on Telegraph Road, with land donated by William Wallace Chinn.

Agnewville was located along the main stage road out of Occoquan. The decline of Agnewville came with the relocation of the main highway from Telegraph Road to the present day U.S. Route 1 through Woodbridge.

== Economy ==
Farming and logging were the main economic activities in the community.

== Present day ==
Most of Agnewville has been redeveloped. North of Minnieville Road is now the community of Lake Ridge. South of Minnieville Road has been developed to some extent, and much of the undeveloped area is zoned for commercial and residential development. The Mount Olive Baptist Church on Telegraph Road still serves the area.

The Tackett's Mill shopping center is the commercial heart of modern-day Agnewville. Construction of the shopping center took place in the 1970s as the area was entire region was being developed. The shopping center derives its name from the grist mill of the same name originally located in Stafford County. In 1983 the remnants of the grist mill were transported to Prince William County to be made into a museum at the center of the shopping center.

Today, the term "Smoketown" often refers to the Smoketown Road corridor one mile to the west of present-day Agnewville.
