= Sudley, Virginia =

Sudley, Virginia (including West Gate)
- Census-designated place
- Location in Prince William County and the state of Virginia.
- Coordinates: 38°47′34″N 77°29′56″W
- Country: United States
- State: Virginia
- County: Prince William

Population (2010)
  - Total: 16,203
- Time zone: UTC−5 (Eastern (EST))
  - Summer (DST): UTC−4 (EDT)
- Area codes: 571, 703

Sudley, Virginia (excluding West Gate)
- Former census-designated place
- Interactive map of Sudley, Virginia (excluding West Gate)

Area
  - Total: 1.5 sq mi (4.0 km^{2})
  - Land: 1.5 sq mi (4.0 km^{2})
  - Water: 0 sq mi (0.0 km^{2})
- Elevation: 210 ft (64 m)

Population (2000)
  - Total: 7,719
  - Density: 4,940/sq mi (1,907.4/km^{2})
- FIPS code: 51-76416
- GNIS feature ID: 1760962

Sudley is a census-designated place (CDP) in Prince William County, Virginia, United States. As of the 2010 census, Sudley comprises what in the 2000 census were the Sudley and West Gate CDPs. As of the 2020 census, Sudley had a population of 19,008.

Sudley contains the Splash Down Waterpark. Residents of Sudley are represented in the Virginia House of Delegates by Danica Roem.

== Geography ==
Sudley is located at 38°47′34″N 77°29′56″W (38.792783, −77.498784).

According to the United States Census Bureau, the CDP has a total area of 1.6 square miles (4.0 km^{2}), all land.

== Demographics ==
=== 2020 census ===
As of the 2020 census, Sudley had a population of 19,008. The median age was 32.9 years. 27.5% of residents were under the age of 18 and 9.4% of residents were 65 years of age or older. For every 100 females there were 101.9 males, and for every 100 females age 18 and over there were 102.8 males age 18 and over.

100.0% of residents lived in urban areas, while 0.0% lived in rural areas.

There were 5,490 households in Sudley, of which 45.1% had children under the age of 18 living in them. Of all households, 50.5% were married-couple households, 18.7% were households with a male householder and no spouse or partner present, and 24.0% were households with a female householder and no spouse or partner present. About 18.9% of all households were made up of individuals and 7.3% had someone living alone who was 65 years of age or older.

There were 5,673 housing units, of which 3.2% were vacant. The homeowner vacancy rate was 1.0% and the rental vacancy rate was 5.6%.

Racial composition as of the 2020 census
Race	Number	Percent
White	5,617	29.6%
Black or African American	2,168	11.4%
American Indian and Alaska Native	345	1.8%
Asian	1,862	9.8%
Native Hawaiian and Other Pacific Islander	13	0.1%
Some other race	6,346	33.4%
Two or more races	2,657	14.0%
Hispanic or Latino (of any race)	9,488	49.9%

=== 2000 census ===
As of the census of 2000, there were 7,719 people, 2,640 households, and 1,998 families residing in the CDP. The population density was 4,940.2 inhabitants per square mile (1,907.4/km^{2}). There were 2,703 housing units at an average density of 1,729.9 per square mile (667.9/km^{2}). The racial makeup of the CDP was 75.41% White, 11.88% African American, 0.48% Native American, 3.72% Asian, 0.12% Pacific Islander, 5.10% from other races, and 3.29% from two or more races. Hispanic or Latino of any race were 9.29% of the population.

There were 2,640 households, out of which 41.5% had children under the age of 18 living with them, 59.1% were married couples living together, 11.8% had a female householder with no husband present, and 24.3% were non-families. 16.7% of all households were made up of individuals, and 2.6% had someone living alone who was 65 years of age or older. The average household size was 2.92 and the average family size was 3.30.

In the CDP, the population was spread out, with 29.1% under the age of 18, 8.7% from 18 to 24, 35.1% from 25 to 44, 22.4% from 45 to 64, and 4.7% who were 65 years of age or older. The median age was 32 years. For every 100 females, there were 98.2 males. For every 100 females age 18 and over, there were 97.7 males.

The median income for a household in the CDP was $67,033, and the median income for a family was $67,246. Males had a median income of $46,196 versus $32,038 for females. The per capita income for the CDP was $26,322. About 3.3% of families and 4.1% of the population were below the poverty line, including 7.7% of those under age 18 and none of those age 65 or over.
