= TESTV =

Chinese streaming media channel

- Country: China
- Headquarters: 25 Keyuan 1st St. Jiulongpo, Chongqing, China

Programming
- Languages: Chinese, Chengdu-Chongqing dialect

Ownership
- Owner: Chongqing Feige Culture Communication Co., Ltd.

History
- Launched: June 17, 2015

Availability

Streaming media
- YouTube: TESTV's channel on YouTube
- Youku: https://i.youku.com/u/UMzAxMzAzODc3Ng
- Bilibili: https://space.bilibili.com/11336264
- iQiyi: https://www.iqiyi.com/u/2329480038

TESTV is a streaming media channel owned by Chongqing Feige Culture Communication Co., Ltd. (Chinese: 重庆市菲格文化传播有限公司). It hosts shows including, Worth Buying? (Chinese: 值不值得买), BB Time, Worth Eating? (Chinese: 值不值得吃), etc., based on platforms like YouTube, Bilibili, Youku and iQiyi.

== Shows ==
=== Worth Buying? ===
Worth Buying? is a goods experiencing show launched on June 17, 2015, when Bamboo Stylus Fineline, a stylus pen, was promoted. By 2018, up to three hundred episodes had been presented. The shows are positioned as experiences rather than evaluations. The episodes are based on small dramas, conversations and interviews. The products vary from high-tech products including major cellphones, laptops, smart speakers, smartwatches, digital cameras, unmanned vehicles, to household and entertainment products such as portable refrigerators, electric skateboards, blenders, dish washers and induction cookers.

=== BB Time ===
BB Time is a vlog-type show, launched on April 13, 2016. The contents include hiking, fan meetings, restaurants and product unboxing and testing. For example, the 145th episode of BB Time tested whether the camera of Vivo Nex is really able to take 50,000 pictures.

=== Worth Eating? ===
Worth Eating? is a cooking show launched on Jun 10th, 2018. At first, the show presented the series of 365 Destinies of Instant Noodles, planning on a year of everyday episodes of instant noodles cooking. Because of complains and bad reviews, the series ended on July 29, 2018 after its 50th episode.

=== Micro movies ===
On Chinese New Year of 2018 (Feb. 16), TESTV presented the micro movie Nyuhouqi's Blind Dates (Chinese: 女后妻相亲记).

== Awards ==
At Google's Think with Google annual meeting on Feb 6th, 2018, TESTV was awarded the Silver Creator Award because of reaching 100K subscribers on YouTube.
