= Belmont Bay =

Bay in Virginia, United States

Coordinates: 38.657365°N 77.20376°W

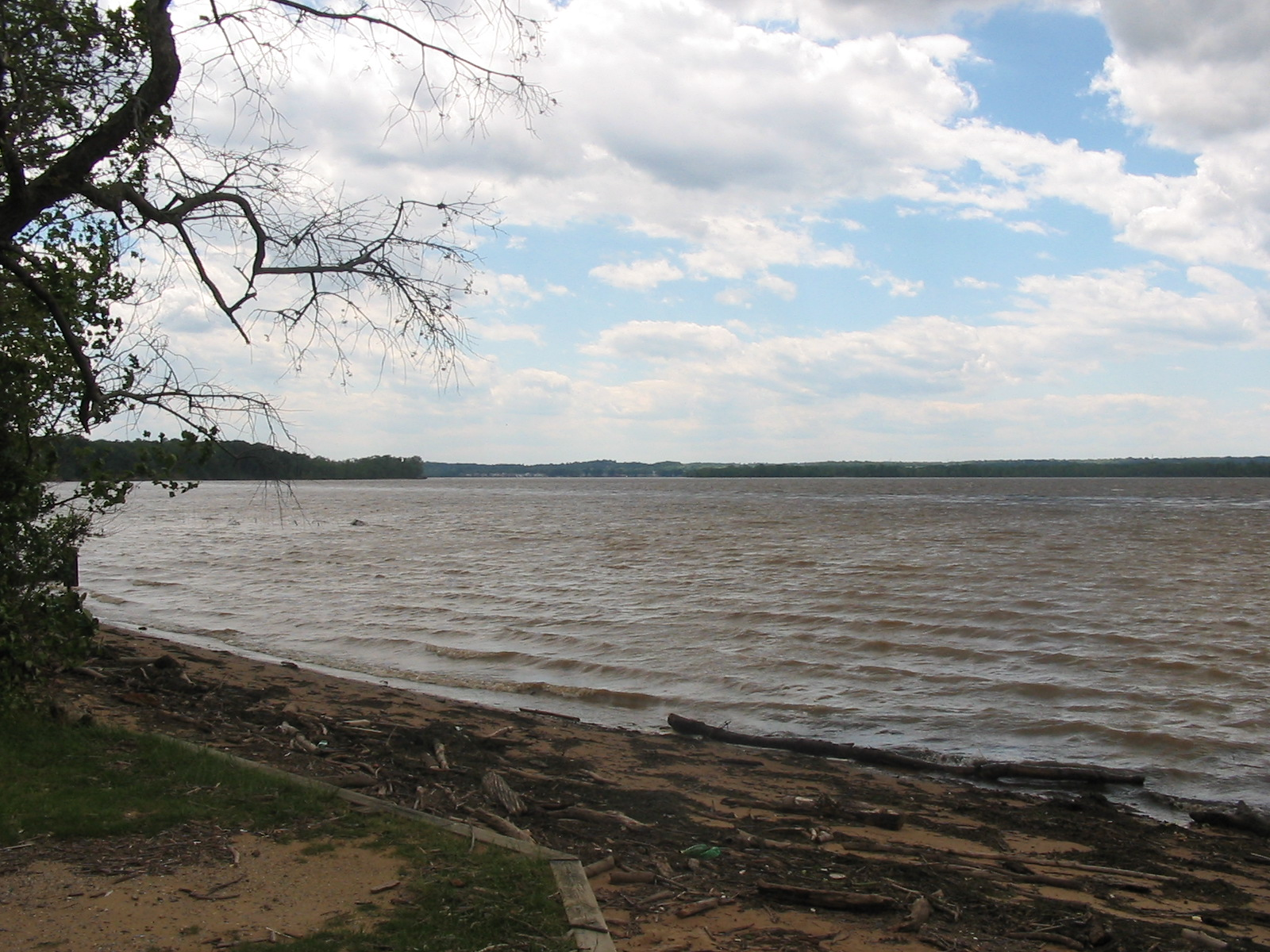
Belmont Bay as seen from Mason Neck State Park

Belmont Bay is a body of water at the mouth of the Occoquan River between Fairfax and Prince William counties, Virginia. The bay covers about 1,500 acres (6.1 km^{2}). The bay adjoins the Elizabeth Hartwell Mason Neck National Wildlife Refuge and Mason Neck State Park on the Fairfax County side and the Occoquan Bay National Wildlife Refuge in Prince William County. The bay was named for the home, "Belmont," which was built circa 1730 overlooking the bay by Catesby Cocke, who was the clerk of the Prince William County court. Belmont Bay is notable for sightings of bald eagles that nest and feed in the refuges and for the numerous Great Blue Herons. Belmont Bay is also a popular destination for pleasure boats. Summer weekends usually attract 40 to as many as 100 boats to this location.

The waterfront community of Belmont Bay is located at the bay.
