= Rixlew, Virginia =

Rixlew
- Unincorporated community
- Location within the state of Virginia Rixlew (Virginia) Rixlew (the United States)
- Coordinates: 38°45′39″N 77°30′21″W
- Country: United States
- State: Virginia
- County: Prince William
- Time zone: UTC−5 (Eastern (EST))
  - Summer (DST): UTC−4 (EDT)

Rixlew is an unincorporated community in Prince William County, Virginia, United States. Rixlew lies on Wellington Road adjacent to the city of Manassas.
