= Wellington, Virginia =

Unincorporated community in Virginia, US

Coordinates: 38°47′24″N 77°33′38″W

Wellington is an unincorporated community in Prince William County, in the U.S. state of Virginia. The original village proper and site of the now extinct post office is where Balls Ford Road intersects with the Norfolk-Southern railway.
