= Prince William County Department of Parks & Recreation =

Prince William County Department of Parks, Recreation & Tourism
Agency overview
- Formed: 1977
- Preceding agency: Prince William County Parks & Recreation, 2021-2017
- Dissolved: Prince William County Park Authority, 2012
- Type: County Government
- Jurisdiction: Prince William County
- Headquarters: Manassas, VA
- Employees: 382
- Annual budget: $30.6 million (FY14)
- Agency executive: Seth Hendler-Voss, Director; (etc.)
- Parent agency: Prince William County
- Website: Official Website

The Prince William County Department of Parks, Recreation & Tourism is responsible for developing and maintaining the various parks, historical sites, and recreational areas owned by Prince William County, Virginia. The Department manages nearly 4,000 acres (16 km²) of parkland and recreational facilities.

== History ==
The Prince William County Park Authority was founded in 1977 by the Prince William Board of County Supervisors to provide the residents and visitors with recreational programs, parks and facilities until the Prince William Board of County Supervisors dissolved the Park Authority and created a new Prince William County Department of Parks & Recreation as of July 1, 2012.

== Operations ==
The Prince William County Department of Parks & Recreation over operates 50 Parks, 2 Water Parks, 2 Fitness & Aquatic Recreation Centers (Chinn Aquatics & Fitness Center and Sharron Baucom Dale City Recreation Center), 2 Community Centers, 6 Sports Complexes, 2 Skate Parks, 1 Dog Park, 2 18-Hole Golf Courses & Mini Golf, Outdoor community pools, Marina Facilities & Fishing, Tennis, Racquetball & Basketball Courts, Batting Cages and over 50 miles of trails, greenways & water trails.

The headquarters is in the Hellwig Administration Building in Manassas, VA.

== See also ==
- Splash Down Waterpark, a waterpark in Manassas.
