= Vivo NEX Dual Display =

2018 android smartphone

- Developer: Vivo
- Manufacturer: Vivo
- Series: NEX
- First released: December 11, 2018; 7 years ago
- Predecessor: Vivo NEX
- Successor: Vivo NEX 3
- Compatible networks: 2G; 3G; 4G; LTE
- Form factor: Slate
- Dimensions: H: 157.2 mm (6.19 in); W: 75.3 mm (2.96 in); D: 8.1 mm (0.32 in)
- Weight: 199 g (7.02 oz)
- Operating system: Android 9.0 "Pie", Funtouch OS 4.5
- System-on-chip: Qualcomm Snapdragon 845
- CPU: Octa-core (4 × 2.7 GHz, 4 × 1.7 GHz) Kryo
- GPU: Adreno 630
- Memory: 10 GB RAM
- Storage: 128 GB
- Battery: 3500 mAh
- Rear camera: triple: 2 and 12 MP, and TOF camera; f/1.8 aperture; Dual pixel; HDR+ processing; FHD 1080p video (up to 30 FPS); 4K 2160p video (up to 30 FPS)
- Display: main: 6.39 in (162 mm) FHD+, 2340 × 1080 (430 ppi) rear: 5.49 in (139 mm) FHD, 1920 × 1080; All: Super AMOLED
- Connectivity: GSM, LTE, LTE Advanced, HSDPA, CDMA
- Data inputs: Sensors: Accelerometer; Compass; Fingerprint scanner (under display); Gyroscope; Proximity sensor
- Website: www.vivo.com.cn/vivo/nexdualdisplay/

The Vivo NEX Dual Display is an Android smartphone which was launched on 11 December 2018. Given the tendency in the late 2010s toward bezelless displays, instead of trimming the display with a notch or hole for housing a front camera and face recognition sensor, it opts to use two screens (on both sides of the phone). Selfies and videocalls are made with the main camera and the rear display as viewfinder.

== Reviews ==
It has been described as a "wow" flagship device and "an unusual concept executed well".
