= Vivo NEX =

Smartphone

Vivo NEX (S)
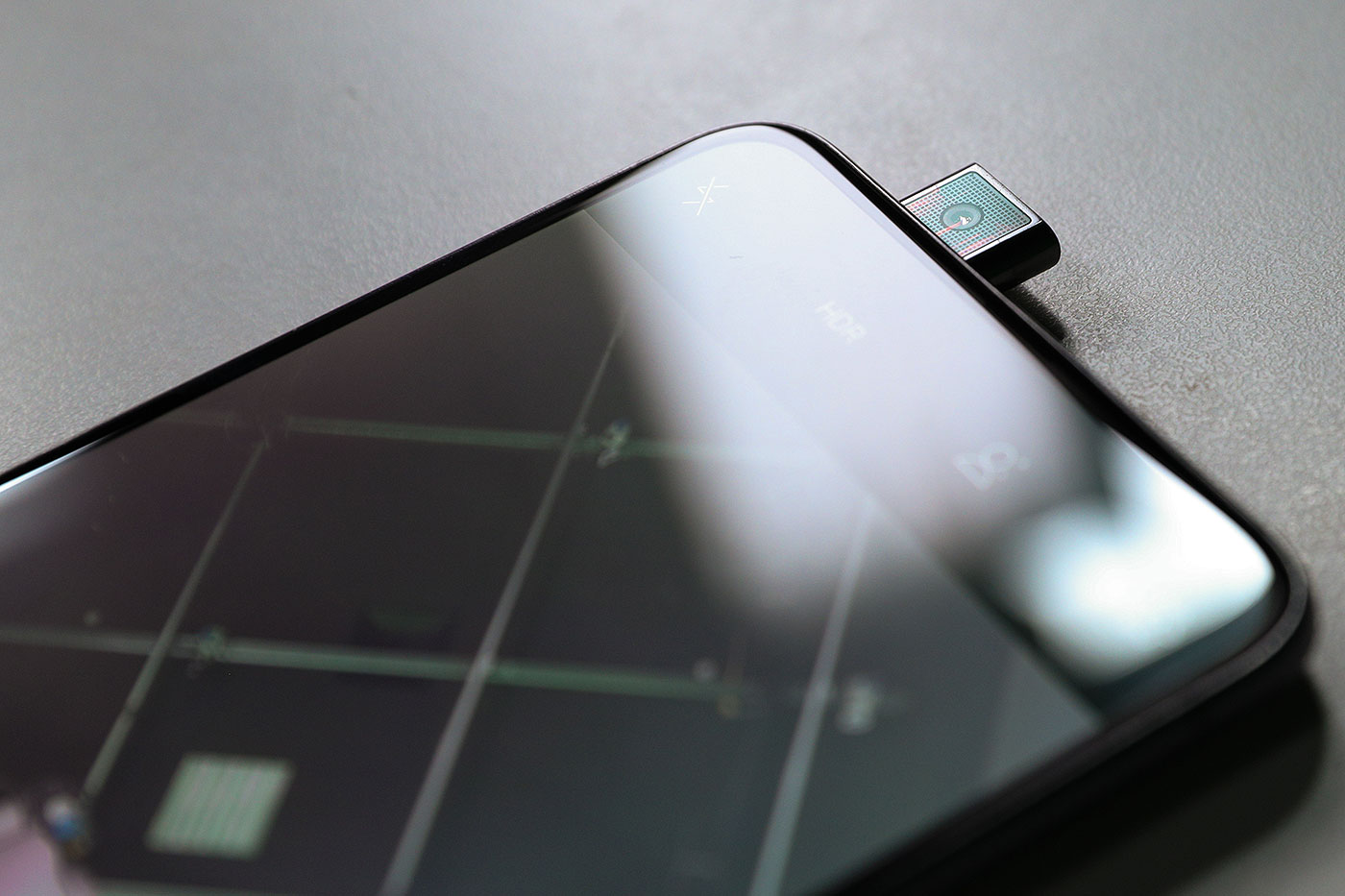
- Brand: Vivo
- Manufacturer: BBK Electronics
- Type: Phablet
- Series: NEX
- First released: June 2018 (Shanghai only, limited units)
- Availability by region: July 2018
- Successor: Vivo NEX Dual Display
- Compatible networks: 2G, 3G, LTE
- Dimensions: 162 mm × 77 mm × 8 mm (6.38 in × 3.03 in × 0.31 in)
- Weight: 199 g (7.0 oz)
- Operating system: Original: Android 8.1 "Oreo" with Funtouch OS 4 Current: Android 10 with Funtouch OS 10
- System-on-chip: Qualcomm Snapdragon 845
- CPU: Octa-core (4x2.7 GHz Kryo 385 Gold & 4x1.7 GHz Kryo 385 Silver)
- GPU: Adreno 630
- Memory: 8 GB
- Storage: 128/256 GB
- Battery: 4,000 mAh
- Rear camera: Dual: 12 MP (f/1.8, 1/2.55", 1.4μm, PDAF, OIS) + 5 MP (f/2.4), phase detection autofocus, dual-LED dual-tone flash, HDR, panorama, 4K at 30 fps, 1080p at 30 fps
- Front camera: 8 MP (f/2.0), 1080p at 30 fps
- Display: 2316×1080 1080p Super AMOLED capacitive touchscreen with 86% screen to body ratio; 6.59 in (167 mm), 388 ppi; Aspect ratio:
- Sound: Vibration; MP3, WAV ringtones
- Connectivity: Wi-Fi 802.11 a/b/g/n/ac Bluetooth 5.0, USB-C 2.0, location (GPS, Galileo, GLONASS, BeiDou)
- Website: www.vivo.com/in/products/nex
- References: www.gsmarena.com/vivo_nex_s-9227.php

The Vivo NEX (also known as the Vivo NEX S) is an Android smartphone that features a different design from traditional smartphones, as it has a mechanical pop-up camera.
