= Prince William County, Virginia =

County in Virginia, United States

Coordinates: 38.70°N 77.48°W

Prince William County
- County
- County of Prince William
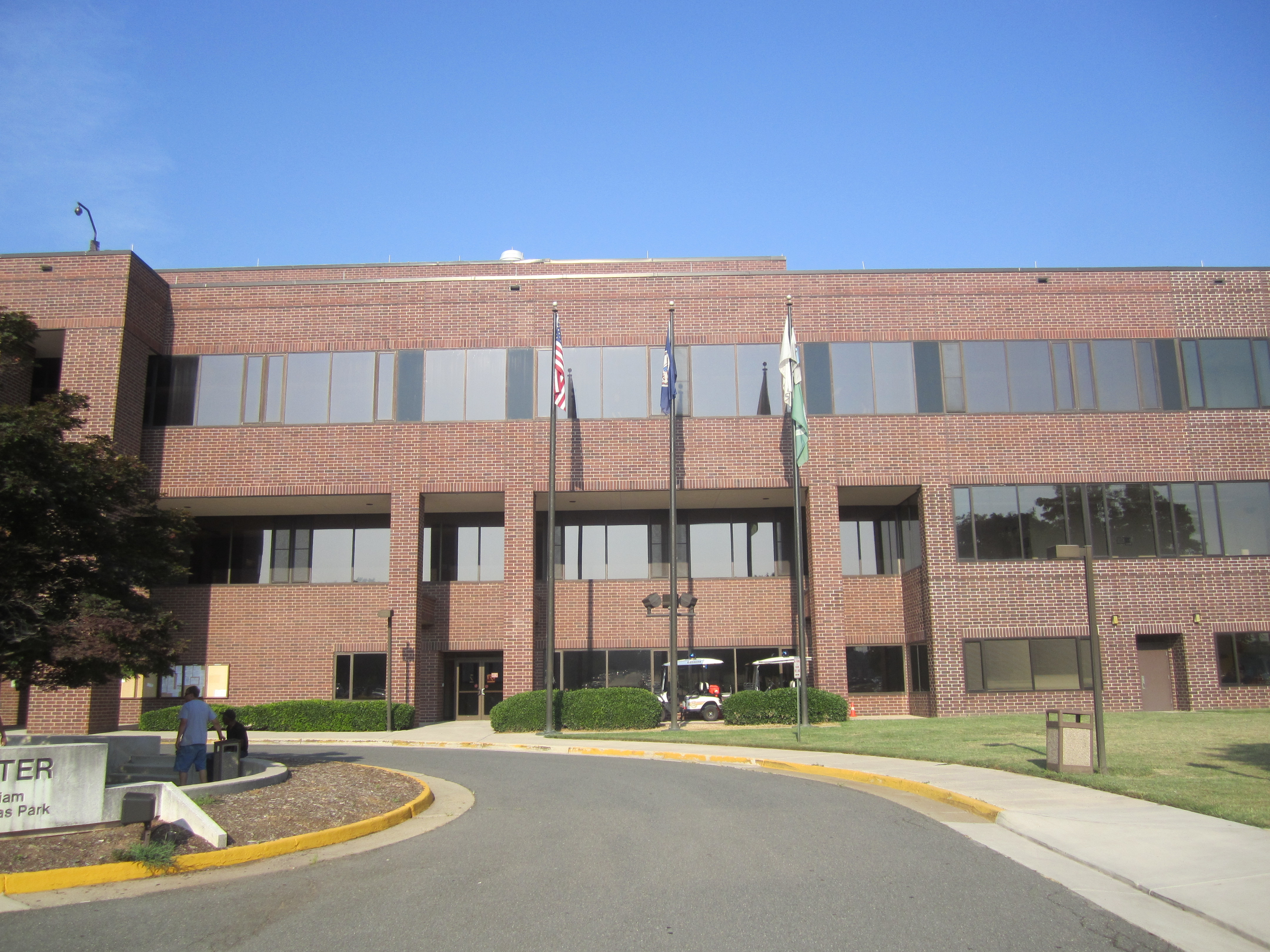
- Prince William County Courthouse

- Flag Seal
- Interactive map of Prince William County
- Location within the Commonwealth of Virginia
- Country: United States
- State: Virginia
- Founded: 1730
- Named for: Prince William, Duke of Cumberland
- County seat: Manassas (independent city)^{1}
- Largest community: Dale City

Government
  - Body: Board of Supervisors
  - Chair: Deshundra Jefferson (D)
  - County Executive: Christopher Shorter

Area
  - Total: 348 sq mi (900 km^{2})
  - Land: 336 sq mi (870 km^{2})
  - Water: 12 sq mi (31 km^{2}) 3.5%

Population (2020)
  - Total: 482,204
  - Estimate (2025): 502,966 ▲
  - Density: 1,400/sq mi (540/km^{2})
- Time zone: UTC−5 (Eastern)
  - Summer (DST): UTC−4 (EDT)
- Area code: 703/571
- FIPS code: 51153
- GNIS feature ID: 1480161
- U.S. House: 7th, 10th
- Virginia Senate: 13th, 28th, 29th, 36th, 39th
- Virginia House: 2nd, 13th, 31st, 40th, 51st, 87th
- Website: http://www.pwcgov.org/

Prince William County lies beside the Potomac River in the Commonwealth of Virginia. At the 2020 census, the population was 482,204, making it Virginia's second most populous county. The county seat is the independent city of Manassas. A part of Northern Virginia, Prince William County is part of the Washington metropolitan area. In 2020, it had the 24th highest income of any county in the United States. The county is named after Prince William, Duke of Cumberland, the youngest son of King George II.

== History ==
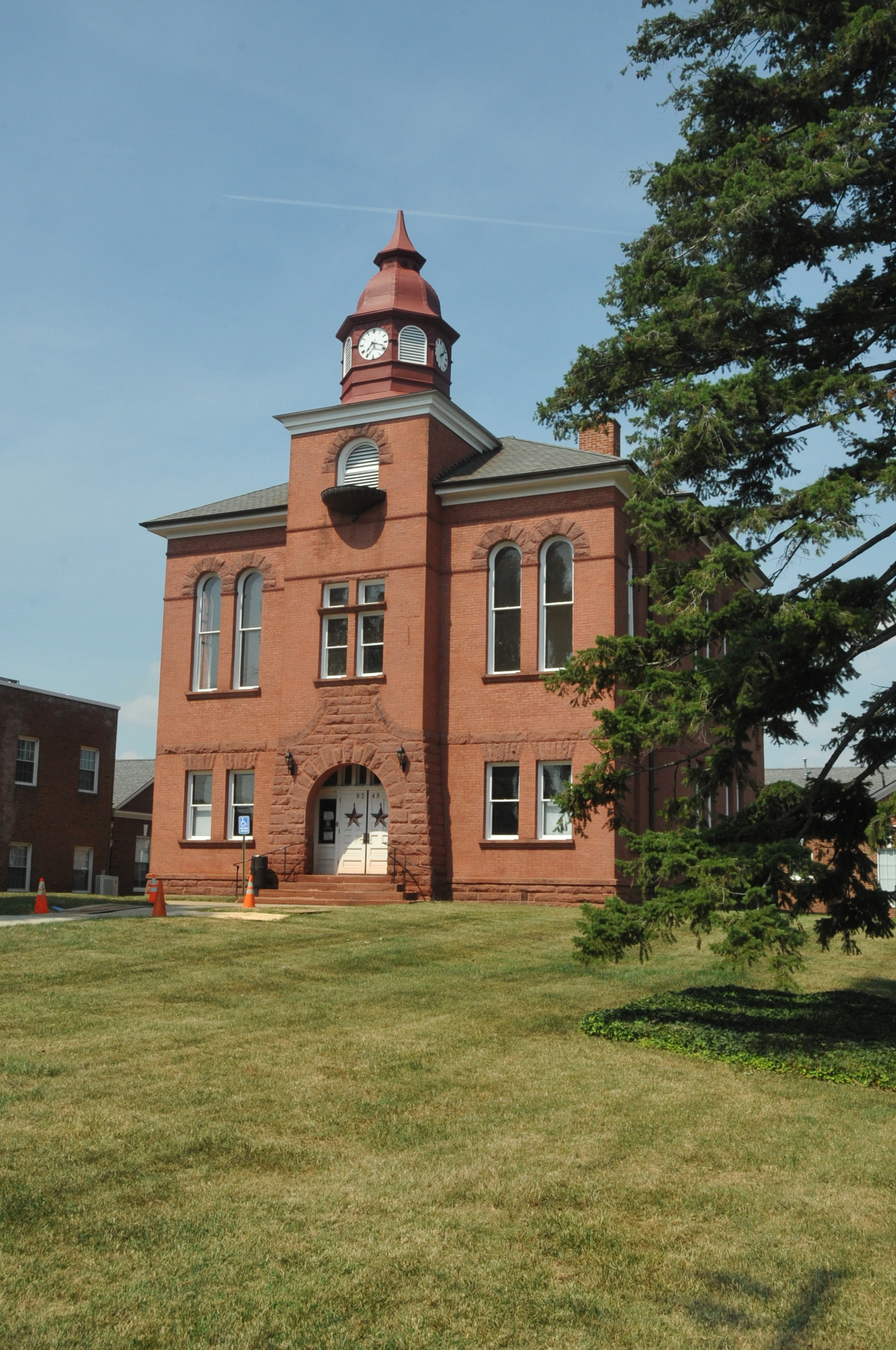
The old county courthouse, built c. 1897, in March 2007

At the time of European colonization, the native tribes of the area that would become Prince William County were the Doeg, an Algonquian-speaking sub-group of the Powhatan tribal confederation.

=== 17th century ===
When John Smith and other English explorers ventured to the upper Potomac River, beginning in 1608, they recorded the name of a village that the Doeg inhabited as Pemacocack (meaning "plenty of fish" in their language). It was on the west bank of the Potomac River, about 30 miles south of present-day Alexandria. Unable to deal with European diseases and firepower, the Doeg abandoned their villages in the area by 1700.

=== 18th century ===
As population increased in the area, the General Assembly of the colony of Virginia split Stafford County, Virginia in 1730, and added a section which had previously been part of King George County in order to create Prince William County. The county was named for Prince William, Duke of Cumberland, the third son of King George II. The area encompassed by the 1731 act creating Prince William County originally included all of what later became the counties of Arlington, Fairfax, Fauquier, and Loudoun; and the independent cities of Alexandria, Fairfax, Falls Church, Manassas, and Manassas Park.

Fairfax County was split from Prince William County in 1742, and first Loudoun (in 1757) and then the incorporated town of Alexandria (in 1779, part of which later became Arlington County) would later be split from Fairfax County. Fauquier County was created from western Prince William County in 1759.

In 1790, Prince William County's population was 58% white; most of the remainder were enslaved African Americans. The county had been an area of tobacco plantations, but planters were changing to cultivate mixed crops due to soil exhaustion and changes in the market. In the first two decades after the Revolution, the number and percentage of free blacks increased in Virginia as some whites freed their slaves, based on revolutionary ideals.

=== 19th century ===
On March 19, 1892, two white men, Lee Heflin and Joseph Dye, were lynched in Haymarket. They had been convicted of the murder of a girl and sentenced to death, but the mob did not want to wait for the legal system. The men were hung from trees at the edge of woods; then the mob shot into their bodies. The Washington Post reported, "mob law...is a dangerous thing to encourage. There is too much of it already throughout the country, and it spreads like a contagion so long as public sentiment tacitly approves it." It was unusual that white men were lynched; in Virginia and the rest of the South, black men were overwhelmingly the victims of lynching, the violence by which whites maintained dominance. The county was rural and agricultural for decades.

=== 20th century ===
Into the early 20th century, the population was concentrated in two areas, one at Manassas (site of a major railroad junction), and the other near Occoquan and Woodbridge along the Potomac River, which was an important transportation route. Beginning in the late 1930s, suburban residential development began, and new housing was developed near the existing population centers, particularly in Manassas.

In 1960, the population was 50,164. Continued suburbanization and growth of the Washington, D.C. metropolitan area caused that to increase rapidly in the following decades. There was expansion of federal, military and commercial activities in Northern Virginia in the late 20th century. By 2000, this was the third-most populous local jurisdiction in Virginia. From 2000 to 2010, the population increased by 43.2%. During this period the county became minority-majority: the new majority is composed of Hispanic (of any race, largely of Central and South American ancestry), African American, and Asian. In 2012 it was the seventh-wealthiest county in the country. The estimated population of 2014 is more than 437,000.

In 1994, The Walt Disney Company bought extensive amounts of land in Haymarket for a proposed Disney's America theme park. Local resistance to the resort, because of its perceived adverse effects on the historic Manassas Battlefield, led to its end as a viable idea. William B. Snyder, a local businessman, convinced Disney to sell the property to him. Snyder, in turn, sold off most of the land to developers, except for the 405 acres (1.64 km^{2}) donated to the National Capital Area Council of the Boy Scouts, who used the land to create Camp Snyder for Cub Scouts.

=== 21st century ===
The Marine Corps Heritage Museum and the Hylton Performing Arts Center opened in the 21st century. The American Wartime Museum is also to be located in this county. During the commemoration of the Sesquicentennial of the Civil War, reenactment of the First and Second Battles of Manassas was planned.

== Geography ==

According to the U.S. Census Bureau, the county has a total area of 348 square miles (900 km^{2}), of which 336 square miles (870 km^{2}) is land and 12 square miles (31 km^{2}) (3.5%) is water. It is bounded on the north by Loudoun and Fairfax Counties; on the west by Fauquier County; on the south by Stafford County; and on the east by the Potomac River (Charles County, Maryland lies across the river). The western half of the county is occupied by a green belt known as the rural crescent.

The Bureau of Economic Analysis combines the independent cities of Manassas and Manassas Park with Prince William County (within which the two cities are enclaves) for statistical purposes:

Name	Area (km^{2})	Population 2000 Census	Population 2010 Census	Population 2020 Census
Manassas (city)	25.59	35,135	37,821	42,772
Manassas Park (city)	6.55	10,290	14,273	17,219
Prince William County	871.27	280,813	402,002	482,204
Totals	903.41	326,238	454,096	542,195

=== Adjacent jurisdictions ===
- Loudoun County – north
- Fairfax County – northeast
- Charles County, Maryland – southeast
- Stafford County – south
- Fauquier County – west
- Manassas – center (enclave)
- Manassas Park – center (enclave)

=== National protected areas ===
- Featherstone National Wildlife Refuge
- Manassas National Battlefield Park
- Occoquan Bay National Wildlife Refuge
- Prince William Forest Park

== Demographics ==
Historical population
Census	Pop.	Note	%±
1790	11,615		—
1800	12,733		9.6%
1810	11,311		−11.2%
1820	9,419		−16.7%
1830	9,330		−0.9%
1840	8,144		−12.7%
1850	8,129		−0.2%
1860	8,565		5.4%
1870	7,504		−12.4%
1880	9,180		22.3%
1890	9,805		6.8%
1900	11,112		13.3%
1910	12,026		8.2%
1920	13,660		13.6%
1930	13,951		2.1%
1940	17,738		27.1%
1950	22,612		27.5%
1960	50,164		121.8%
1970	111,102		121.5%
1980	144,636		30.2%
1990	215,686		49.1%
2000	280,813		30.2%
2010	402,002		43.2%
2020	482,204		20.0%
2025 (est.)	502,966	▲	4.3%
U.S. Decennial Census; 1790–1960 1900–1990; 1990–2000 2010 2020

=== Racial and ethnic composition ===
Prince William County, Virginia – Racial and ethnic composition Note: the US Census treats Hispanic/Latino as an ethnic category. This table excludes Latinos from the racial categories and assigns them to a separate category. Hispanics/Latinos may be of any race.
Race / Ethnicity (NH = Non-Hispanic)	Pop 1980	Pop 1990	Pop 2000	Pop 2010	Pop 2020	% 1980	% 1990	% 2000	% 2010	% 2020
White alone (NH)	126,665	174,082	181,756	195,656	185,048	87.53%	80.71%	64.72%	48.67%	38.38%
Black or African American alone (NH)	11,781	24,677	51,743	78,492	94,939	8.14%	11.44%	18.43%	19.53%	19.69%
Native American or Alaska Native alone (NH)	358	659	891	984	745	0.25%	0.31%	0.32%	0.24%	0.15%
Asian alone (NH)	2,080	6,381	10,606	29,986	49,836	1.44%	2.96%	3.78%	7.46%	10.34%
Native Hawaiian or Pacific Islander alone (NH)	x	x	335	414	507	x	x	0.12%	0.10%	0.11%
Other race alone (NH)	547	225	712	1,227	3,384	0.38%	0.10%	0.25%	0.31%	0.70%
Mixed race or Multiracial (NH)	x	x	7,432	13,783	26,221	x	x	2.65%	3.43%	5.44%
Hispanic or Latino (any race)	3,272	9,662	27,338	81,460	121,524	2.26%	4.48%	9.74%	20.26%	25.20%
Total	144,703	215,686	280,813	402,002	482,204	100.00%	100.00%	100.00%	100.00%	100.00%

=== 2020 census ===
As of the 2020 census, the county had a population of 482,204. The median age was 35.7 years. 26.7% of residents were under the age of 18 and 10.5% of residents were 65 years of age or older. For every 100 females there were 96.8 males, and for every 100 females age 18 and over there were 94.4 males age 18 and over.

The racial makeup of the county was 41.6% White, 20.2% Black or African American, 0.7% American Indian and Alaska Native, 10.4% Asian, 0.1% Native Hawaiian and Pacific Islander, 13.8% from some other race, and 13.1% from two or more races. Hispanic or Latino residents of any race comprised 25.2% of the population.

95.4% of residents lived in urban areas, while 4.6% lived in rural areas.

There were 153,745 households in the county, of which 42.9% had children under the age of 18 living with them and 22.5% had a female householder with no spouse or partner present. About 17.9% of all households were made up of individuals and 5.5% had someone living alone who was 65 years of age or older.

There were 158,525 housing units, of which 3.0% were vacant. Among occupied housing units, 71.6% were owner-occupied and 28.4% were renter-occupied. The homeowner vacancy rate was 0.9% and the rental vacancy rate was 4.7%.

=== 2010 census ===
As of the census of 2010, there were 402,002 people, 137,115 housing units, and 130,785 households residing in the county. The population density was 1,186 inhabitants per square mile (458/km^{2}). There were 137,115 housing units at an average density of 405 per square mile (156/km^{2}).

Also according to census figures, there were 130,785 households in Prince William County as of April 1, 2010. According to the Census Bureau's 2009 American Community Survey, 76.1% of the county's households are occupied by families, (compared to 66.5% in the United States). This represents a decrease of 4.6 percentage points since 1990, when 80.7% of households in the county were families. Approximately 42.2% of Prince William County's households are family households occupied by parents with their own children under 18 years of age.

According to the Census Bureau's 2009 American Community Survey, 29.3% of the total County population was under 18 years of age; approximately 6.5% was aged 65 and over. The median age of the population was 33.2 years. The 2009 American Community Survey also indicated that 50.0% of the county's population was male and 50.0% is female.

According to the 2009 American Community Survey, the 2009 median household income in Prince William County was $89,785. The per capita income for the county was $35,890. The 2009 American Community Survey reported that in 2009, 6.0% of Prince William County's population was living below the poverty line, including 7.7% of those under age 18 and 5.3% of those age 65 or over.

== Economy ==
=== Top employers ===
According to the county's 2025 Comprehensive Annual Financial Report, the top employers in the county are:

#	Employer	# of Employees
1	Prince William County Public Schools	1,000 and over
2	Prince William County Government	1,000 and over
3	Department of Defense	1,000 and over
4	Walmart	1,000 and over
5	Sentara Healthcare	1,000 and over
6	Morale, Welfare, and Recreation	1,000 and over
7	Target Corporation	500 to 999
8	Wegmans	500 to 999
9	The Fischel Company	500 to 999
10	Giant Food	500 to 999

Prince William and neighboring Loudoun County are home to millions of square feet of data centers.

== Education ==
=== K-12 ===
Prince William County Public Schools is the second largest school system in Virginia (having, circa 2007, overtaken Virginia Beach City Public Schools). The system consists of 57 elementary, 16 middle, and 13 high schools, as well as a virtual high school, two traditional schools, three special education schools, and two alternative schools. The Superintendent of Prince William County Public Schools is Dr. LaTanya McDade. The system has a television station called PWCS-TV. It is programmed and operated by Prince William County Public Schools' Media Production Services Department and is accessible to Comcast and Verizon subscribers in Prince William County.

The county system serves all parts of the county except for Marine Corps Base Quantico, which is served by the Department of Defense Education Activity (DoDEA). The DoDEA high school is Quantico Middle High School.

=== Higher education ===
- George Mason University, Science and Technology Campus; Manassas, Virginia
- Northern Virginia Community College, Manassas Campus; Manassas, Virginia
- Northern Virginia Community College, Woodbridge Campus; Woodbridge, Virginia

=== Catholic schools ===
The Diocese of Arlington provides education from pre-K through middle school at multiple diocesan run schools, and grades 9–12 at Pope John Paul the Great Catholic High School in Dumfries.

== Sports ==
Northern Virginia FC is an American minor league soccer team, also located in Woodbridge, Virginia. NoVa FC has minor league affiliation with D.C. United, Washington, D.C. Major League Soccer franchise.

The historic Old Dominion Speedway was located in Manassas. Opened in 1948, it was the location of the first commercial drag race held on the East Coast, and was a stop on the NASCAR Grand National schedule in the late 50s and early 60s. Old Dominion Speedway closed in the Fall of 2012 because of noise complaints.

== Government and politics ==
=== County elected offices ===
The county is divided into seven magisterial districts: Brentsville, Coles, Potomac, Gainesville, Neabsco, Occoquan, and Woodbridge. The magisterial districts each elect one supervisor to the Board of Supervisors which governs Prince William County. There is also a chairman elected by the county at-large, bringing total board membership to 8. A vice-chairman is selected by the board from among its membership. The county operates under the county form of the county executive system of government, with an elected Board of Supervisors. The board appoints a professional, nonpartisan county executive to manage operations of government agencies.

Christopher Shorter was named County Executive for Prince William County, Virginia, by the Board of County Supervisors in October 2022. Prior to serving as the County Executive in Prince William County, he served as the first City Administrator in the City of Baltimore, Assistant City Manager in Austin, Texas, and served for more than 10 years in various leadership roles for the District of Columbia government, including Director of the DC Department of Public Works.

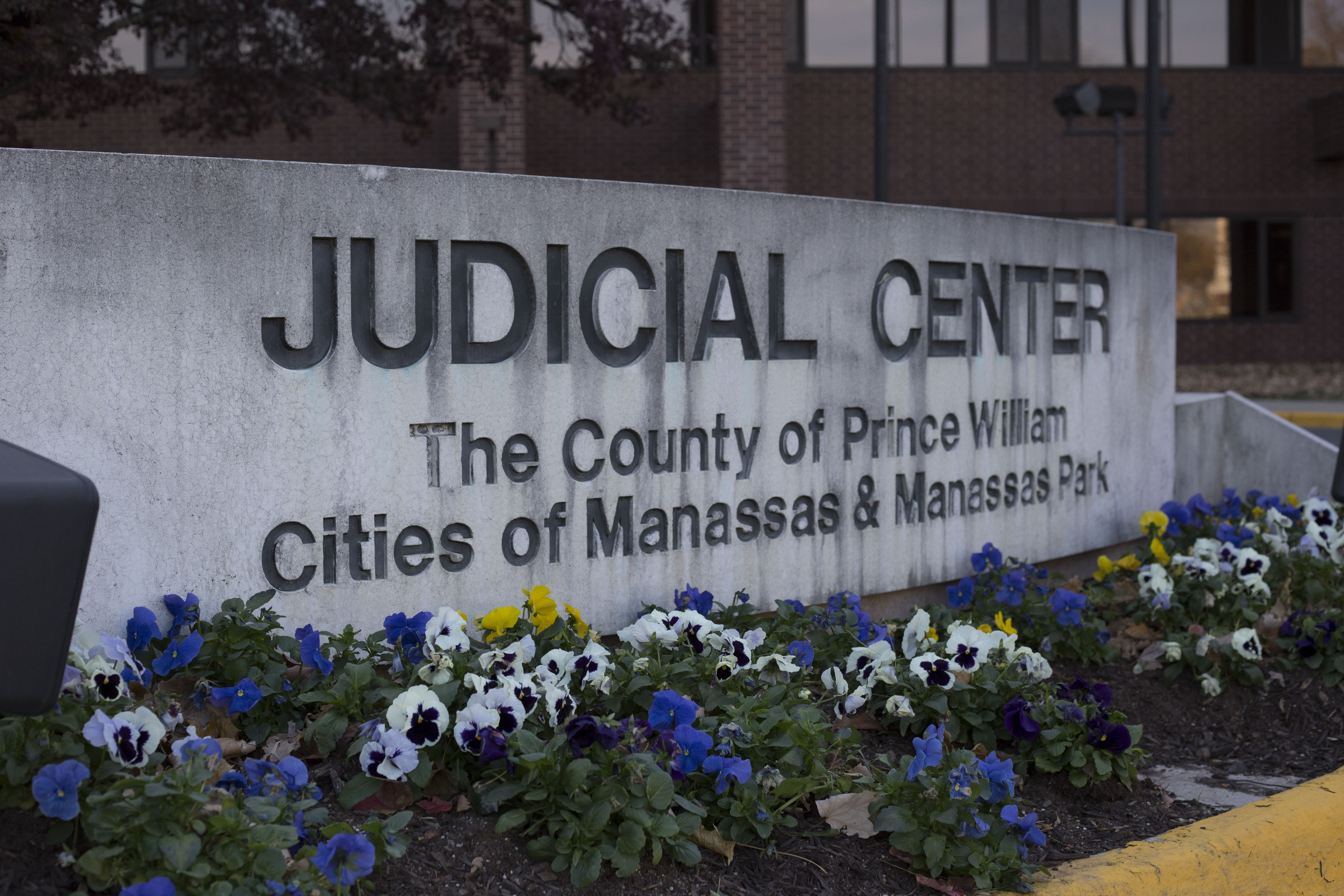
Prince William County Judicial Center

In other elected County offices, the Prince William County Commonwealth's Attorney, Amy Ashworth, and the Prince William County Clerk of Circuit Court, Jacqueline Smith are Democrats. The Prince William County Sheriff, Glen Hill, is a Republican.

Prince William Board of County Supervisors by partisanship
All 7 districts 5 (Note: This includes the 1 county-wide elected member.) seats needed for a majority
	Majority party	Minority party
Party	Democratic	Republican
Seats	5	3
- As of 2026; Democratic Republican

Board of County Supervisors
Name	Party	First Election	District
Deshundra L. Jefferson, Chairman	Dem	2023	At-Large
Tom Gordy	Rep	2023	Brentsville
Yesli Vega	Rep	2019	Coles
George T. Stewart	Dem	2025	Gainesville
Victor Angry	Dem	2019	Neabsco
Kenny A. Boddye	Dem	2019	Occoquan
Andrea O. Bailey	Dem	2019	Potomac
Jeannie LaCroix	Rep	2026	Woodbridge

Constitutional Officers
Position	Name	Party	First Election
Sheriff	Glendell Hill	Rep	2003
Commonwealth's Attorney	Amy Ashworth	Dem	2019
Clerk of Circuit Court	Jacqueline Smith	Dem	2017

=== State elected offices ===
Republicans formerly held six of the eight Virginia House of Delegates seats that include parts of the county, with that delegation having consisted of Robert G. Marshall, Scott Lingamfelter, Tim Hugo, Jackson Miller, Rich Anderson, and Mark Dudenhefer. In the 2017 legislative election, which saw the Democrats cut a Republican majority in the House of Delegates from 66 to 51, Prince William County saw its number of Republican Delegates be reduced from six to one, with Tim Hugo being the sole Republican to represent the county. Marshall, Lingamfelter, Miller, and Anderson all ran for reelection and were defeated by Democratic challengers Danica Roem, Elizabeth Guzmán, Lee Carter, and Hala Ayala respectively. Dudenhefer opted to retire and instead successfully ran for a seat on the Stafford County Board of Supervisors, and he was replaced by Democrat Jennifer Carroll Foy. Democrats Luke Torian and John Bell were already representing the county in the House at the time of the 2017 elections, and with the addition of the five newcomers, Democrats held seven of the eight House seats that include parts of Prince William County. Hugo was then defeated in the 2019 election by Democrat Dan Helmer.

In the 2025 election, former delegate Elizabeth Guzmán defeated the last Republican delegate from Prince William county in the House, Ian Lovejoy. Democrats now hold all seven house seats that include parts of the county.

All three Virginia State Senate seats that include parts of the county are held by Democrats.

Representatives to the Virginia House of Delegates
Name	Party	First Election	District
Candi Mundon King	Dem	2021	23
Rozia Henson	Dem	2023	19
Elizabeth Guzmán	Dem	2025	22
Michelle Maldonado	Dem	2021	20
Briana Sewell	Dem	2021	25
Luke Torian	Dem	2009	24
Josh Thomas	Dem	2023	21

Representatives to the Virginia State Senate
Name	Party	First Election	District
Danica Roem	Dem	2023	30
Jeremy McPike	Dem	2015	29
Jennifer Carroll Foy	Dem	2023	33

=== National politics ===
Democrats hold both of the U.S. Congressional seats - the 7th and 10th Congressional Districts - that include parts of Prince William County.

In 2006, Democratic U.S. Senator candidate Jim Webb carried the county with 50.51% of the vote.

In the 2008 United States presidential election, Democrat Barack Obama carried Prince William with 57.51% of the vote, compared to Republican John McCain who received 41.62%. Obama's final rally the night before the election was held at the Prince William County Fairgrounds, just outside the city of Manassas. He was the first Democrat to carry the county since 1964.

Continuing demographic changes in the county, such as an increasingly diverse and urbanized population, were cited by The New York Times as contributing to Obama's success in the 2012 United States presidential election and suggesting the future appeal of the Democratic Party in the United States. Between 2000 and 2010, county population had increased by 121,189 persons (43.2%). It had changed from a primarily white, rural county. Prince William by 2012 had an educated professional population with the seventh-highest income in the country; it is the first county in Virginia to be composed of a majority of minorities: Hispanic, African American, and Asian. Obama and the Democrats attracted their votes. Time identified Prince William as one of five critical counties in Virginia for the election. Obama defeated Romney soundly by 16 percentage points with a margin of 57%–41%, narrowly beating his 2008 margin.

The county continued its trend toward Democratic candidates in the 2016 United States presidential election, Prince William County voted 57.6% for Hillary Clinton to Trump's 36.5%. Clinton's victory represented the largest margin of victory for any presidential candidate in the county since 1988. In 2020, Prince William County voted for Joe Biden with 62.6% of the vote, the largest share of the vote for a Democratic candidate since 1944.

The county has been a focal point for right-wing conspiracy theories about illegitimate votes during the 2020 presidential election. Virginia conservatives cited the prosecution of Prince William County's former top election official, Michele White, for alleged vote count fraud in 2020 as evidence of election fraud concerns. However, the case was dropped, and it was revealed that the errors in vote tabulation actually favored Trump, with no evidence of intentional fraud or significant impact on election outcomes.

United States presidential election results for Prince William County, Virginia
Year	Republican		Democratic		Third party(ies)	
Year	No.	%	No.	%	No.	%
1880	459	29.09%	1,119	70.91%	0	0.00%
1884	576	31.67%	1,243	68.33%	0	0.00%
1888	740	35.97%	1,313	63.83%	4	0.19%
1892	663	32.23%	1,356	65.92%	38	1.85%
1896	727	35.00%	1,341	64.56%	9	0.43%
1900	680	33.48%	1,351	66.52%	0	0.00%
1904	228	23.80%	724	75.57%	6	0.63%
1908	200	21.07%	738	77.77%	11	1.16%
1912	82	8.20%	814	81.40%	104	10.40%
1916	192	20.21%	754	79.37%	4	0.42%
1920	393	33.25%	786	66.50%	3	0.25%
1924	269	22.99%	847	72.39%	54	4.62%
1928	817	49.73%	826	50.27%	0	0.00%
1932	386	20.24%	1,499	78.61%	22	1.15%
1936	457	23.06%	1,512	76.29%	13	0.66%
1940	500	25.77%	1,435	73.97%	5	0.26%
1944	763	36.20%	1,340	63.57%	5	0.24%
1948	760	36.49%	1,162	55.78%	161	7.73%
1952	1,619	49.14%	1,653	50.17%	23	0.70%
1956	2,023	50.96%	1,851	46.62%	96	2.42%
1960	2,624	46.53%	2,987	52.97%	28	0.50%
1964	3,343	37.30%	5,611	62.60%	9	0.10%
1968	7,944	42.51%	5,566	29.79%	5,176	27.70%
1972	20,149	72.26%	7,266	26.06%	469	1.68%
1976	15,446	49.00%	15,215	48.26%	863	2.74%
1980	23,061	58.95%	12,787	32.69%	3,271	8.36%
1984	34,992	68.88%	15,631	30.77%	180	0.35%
1988	39,654	66.70%	19,198	32.29%	601	1.01%
1992	35,432	46.82%	26,486	35.00%	13,762	18.18%
1996	39,292	50.09%	33,462	42.66%	5,689	7.25%
2000	52,788	52.52%	44,745	44.52%	2,978	2.96%
2004	69,776	52.84%	61,271	46.40%	1,016	0.77%
2008	67,621	41.63%	93,435	57.52%	1,390	0.86%
2012	74,458	41.32%	103,331	57.34%	2,406	1.34%
2016	71,721	36.49%	113,144	57.57%	11,673	5.94%
2020	81,222	35.61%	142,863	62.64%	3,971	1.74%
2024	90,203	39.44%	131,128	57.33%	7,381	3.23%

== Museums ==
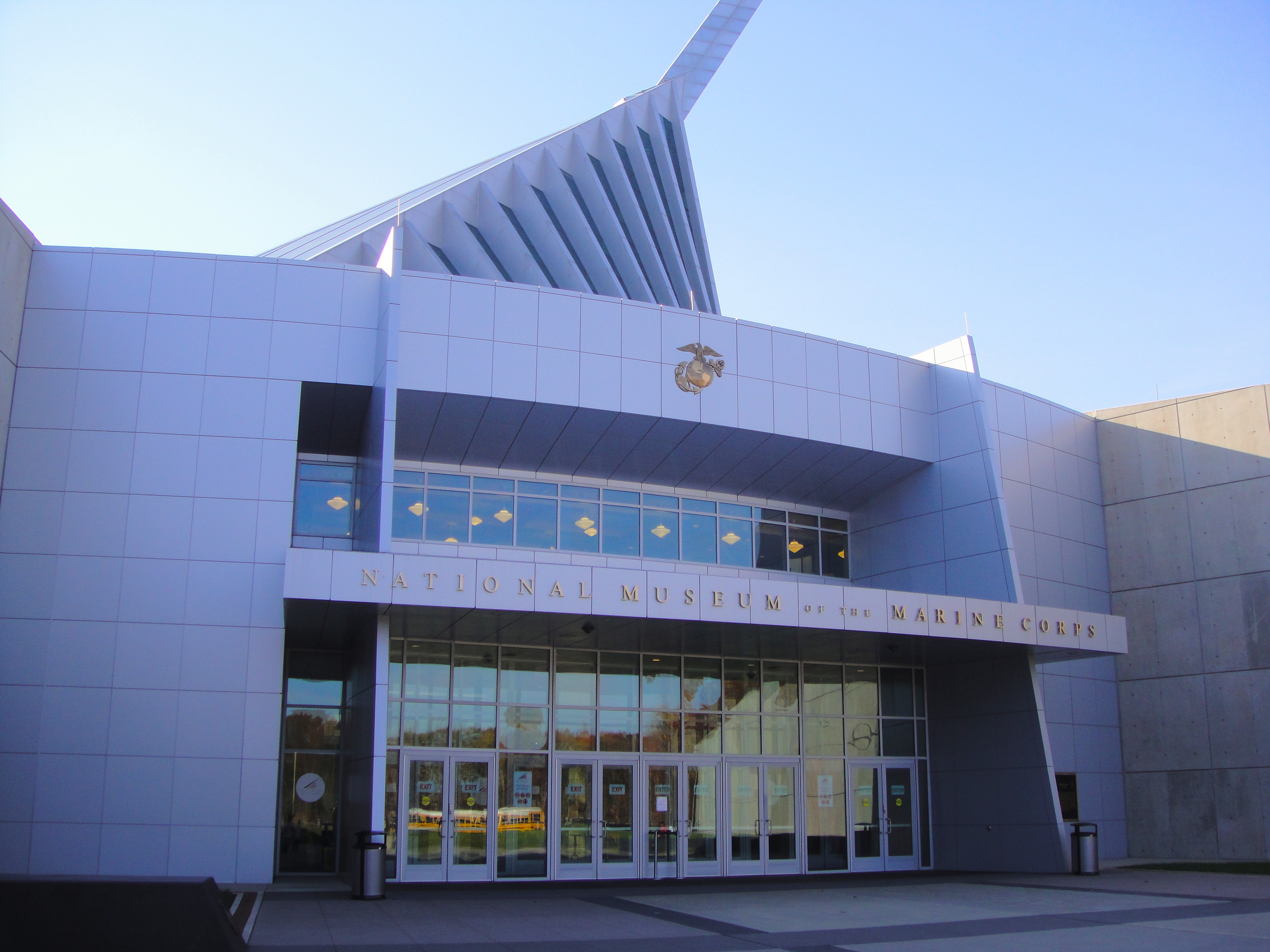
The National Museum of the Marine Corps in November 2010

The National Museum of the Marine Corps is located in Triangle, Virginia and is free to the public. The Historic Preservation Division of Prince William County also operates multiple historic properties and museums including: Rippon Lodge Historic Site, Brentsville Historic Centre, Bristoe Station Battlefield Heritage Park, Lucasville School Historic Site, and Ben Lomond Historic Site.

== Libraries ==
The Prince William Public Library System is a regional public library system that serves Prince William County, the City of Manassas and the City of Manassas Park. The system consists of 12 physical branches.

== Parks ==
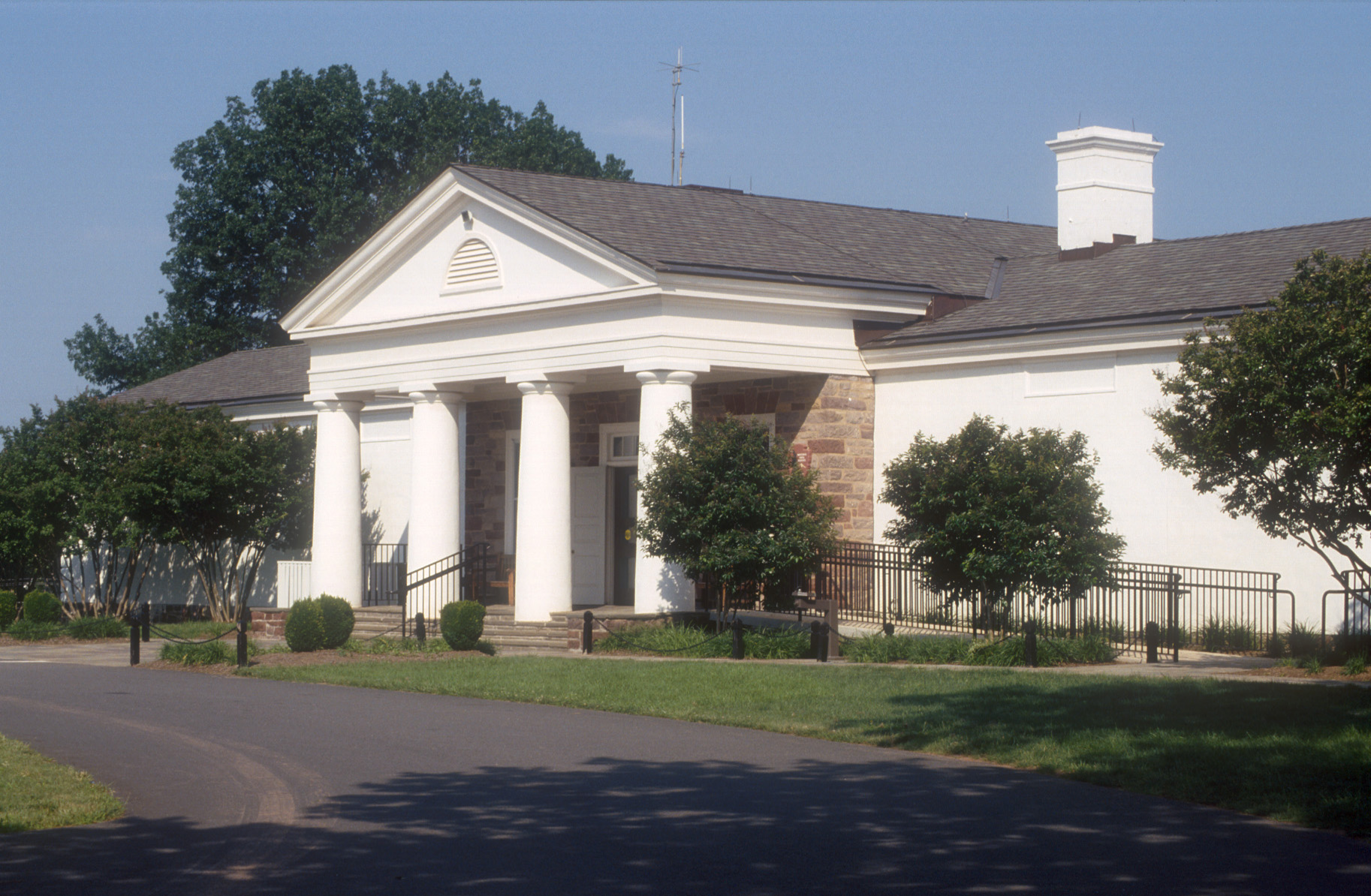
The Manassas National Battlefield Park visitor center in July 2003

Two National Parks, one state park, and numerous local parks lie within the county.

Prince William Forest Park was established as Chopawamsic Recreational Demonstration Area in 1936 and is located in eastern Prince William County. This is the largest protected natural area in the Washington, D.C. metropolitan region at over 15,000 acres (6,070 ha).

Manassas National Battlefield Park, located north of Manassas in Prince William County, preserves the site of two major American Civil War battles: the First Battle of Manassas on July 21, 1861, and the Second Battle of Manassas which was fought between August 28 and 30, 1862. Outside the South, these battles are commonly referred to as the first and second battles of Bull Run.

Leesylvania State Park, the ancestral home of the Lee family, is a 556 acre park with a range of recreational activities and views of the Potomac River.

The Prince William County Department of Parks & Recreation operates fifty parks, two water parks, two recreation centers (Birchdale Rec. Center and Sharron Baucom Dale City Rec. Center), two community centers, six sports complexes, and an ice-skating rink.

The county is also home to two National Wildlife Refuges: Featherstone National Wildlife Refuge and Occoquan Bay National Wildlife Refuge. Both are part of the Potomac River National Wildlife Refuge Complex.

== Transportation ==
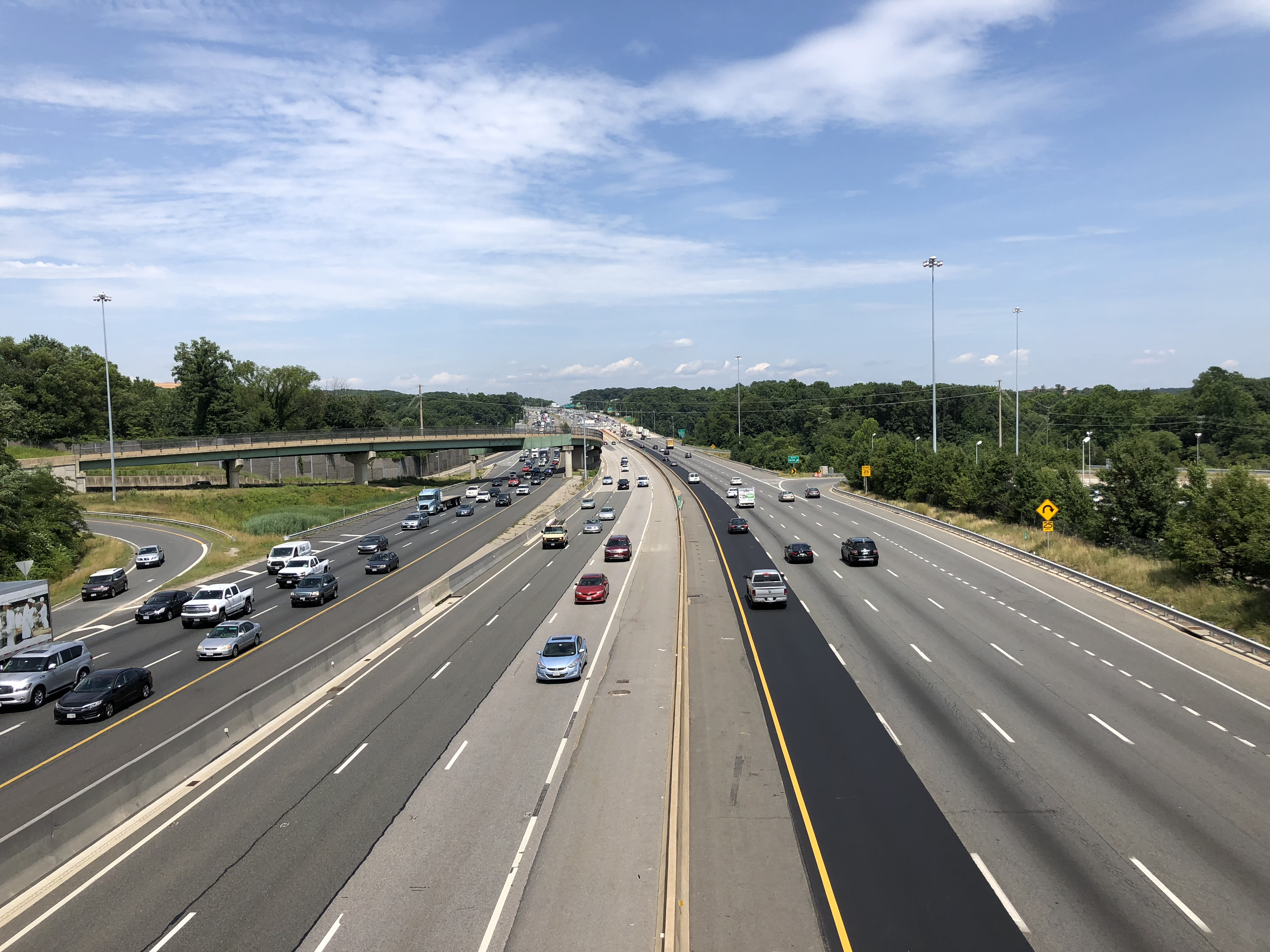
I-95 in Woodbridge

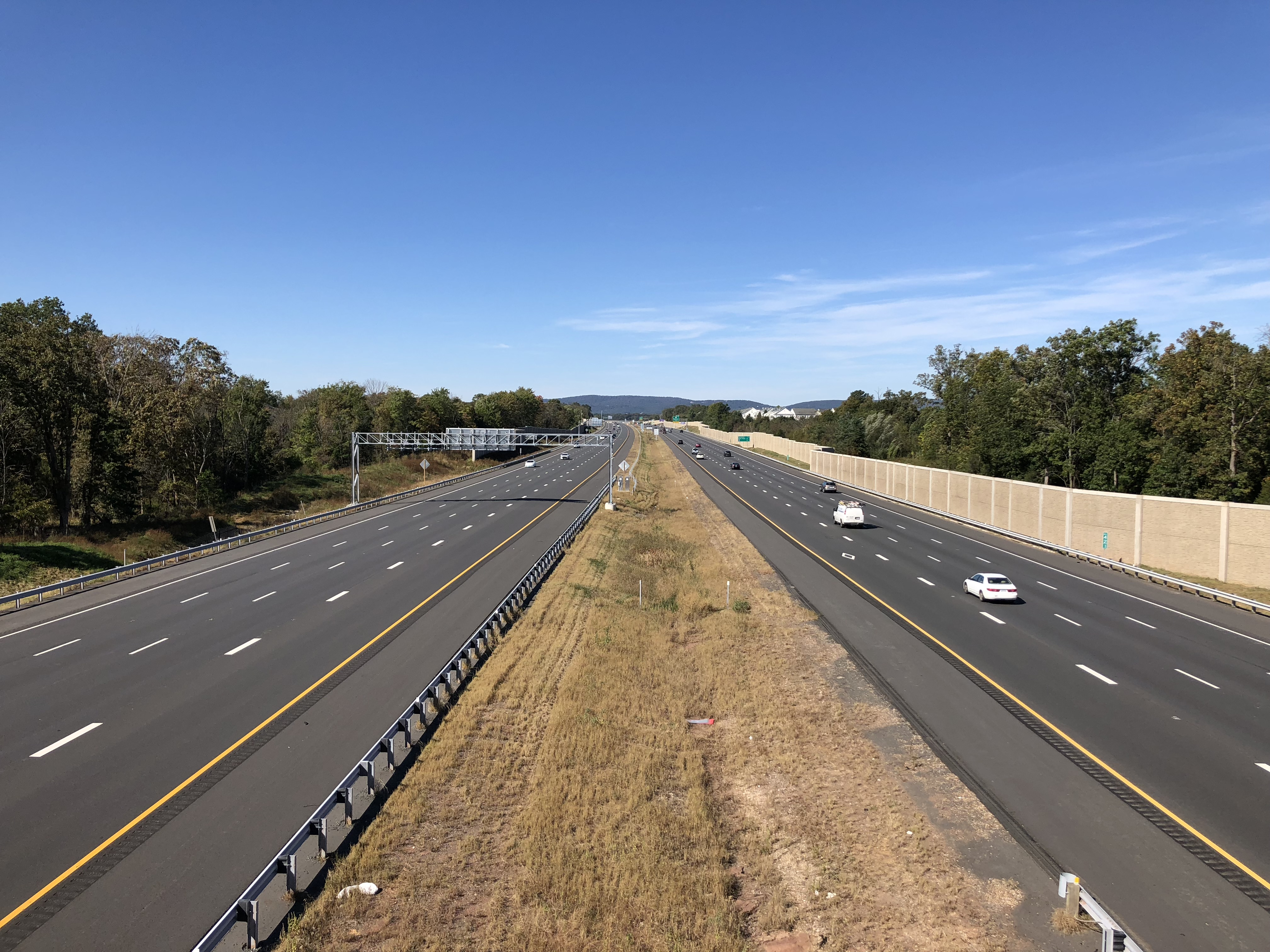
I-66 in Gainesville

The county is traversed by many major highways and roads, including the following:

- Interstate 66
- Interstate 95
- U.S. Route 1 (Richmond Highway)
- U.S. Route 15 (James Madison Highway)
- U.S. Route 29 (Lee Highway)
- State Route 28 (Nokesville Road/Centerville Road)
- State Route 55 (John Marshall Highway/Washington Street)
- State Route 123 (Gordon Boulevard)
- State Route 215 (Vint Hill Road)
- State Route 234 (Dumfries Road/Prince William Parkway/Sudley Road)
- State Route 234 Business (Dumfries Road/Grant Avenue/Sudley Road)
- State Route 294 (Prince William Parkway)
- State Route 393 (Campus Drive)
- State Route 394 (College Drive)
- State Route 612 (Yates Ford Road)
- State Route 619 (Linton Hall Road/Bristow Road/Joplin Road/Fuller Heights Road)
- State Route 784 (Dale Boulevard)

Manassas Regional Airport lies near its namesake city; for commercial passengers, both Dulles Airport and Ronald Reagan Washington National Airport are located nearby.

Public bus service in the county is provided by the Potomac and Rappahannock Transportation Commission. Services provided by PRTC include OmniRide, OmniLink, and OmniMatch.

The county is served by both Virginia Railway Express (VRE) lines. The Manassas line has the Manassas Park, Manassas, and Broad Run / Airport stations. The Fredericksburg line has the Woodbridge, Rippon, and Quantico stations. The Manassas, Quantico and Woodbridge stations are also served by Amtrak.

== Communities ==
=== Towns ===
- Dumfries
- Haymarket
- Occoquan
- Quantico

=== Villages ===
- Nokesville

=== Hamlets ===
- Brentsville
- Catharpin
- Greenwich
- Woolsey

=== Census-designated places ===
- Buckhall
- Bull Run
- Bull Run Mountain Estates
- Cherry Hill
- County Center
- Dale City
- Gainesville
- Independent Hill
- Innovation
- Lake Ridge
- Leesylvania
- Linton Hall
- Loch Lomond
- Montclair
- Nokesville
- Potomac Mills
- Quantico Base
- Sudley
- Triangle
- Woodbridge
- Yorkshire

=== Other unincorporated communities ===
- Aden
- Ashland
- Bethel
- Bristow
- Buckland
- Canova
- Cornwell
- Featherstone
- Hoadly
- Joplin
- Quantico Station
- Rixlew
- Southbridge
- Sudley Springs
- Thoroughfare
- Waterfall
- Wellington
- West Gate

=== Former communities ===
- Agnewville
- Batestown
- Groveton
- Hickory Grove
- Hickory Ridge
- Kopp
- Minnieville
- Pamacocack

=== Independent cities ===
The independent cities of Manassas and Manassas Park are surrounded by Prince William County. Before becoming independent cities in 1975, as are all cities in Virginia, both were towns and officially part of the county. The Prince William County Circuit, District, Juvenile and Domestic Relations Courts, Prince William County Commonwealth Attorney's Office, Prince William County Adult Detention Center, Prince William County Sheriff's Office, and other county agencies are located at Prince William County Courthouse complex. The courthouse complex itself is located in a Prince William County enclave surrounded by the city of Manassas.

Prince William County, Manassas, and Manassas Park share a single judicial system (courts) and Constitutional offices (Commonwealth's Attorney, Sheriff, Circuit Court Clerk).

== Notable people ==
- Margaret Kempe Howell, mother-in-law of Jefferson Davis
- Shaboozey, musician
- Austin Steward, abolitionist
- Tommy Richman, rapper
- Sarah Everhardt, figure skater
- Tatiana Malinina, figure skater

== Other important features ==
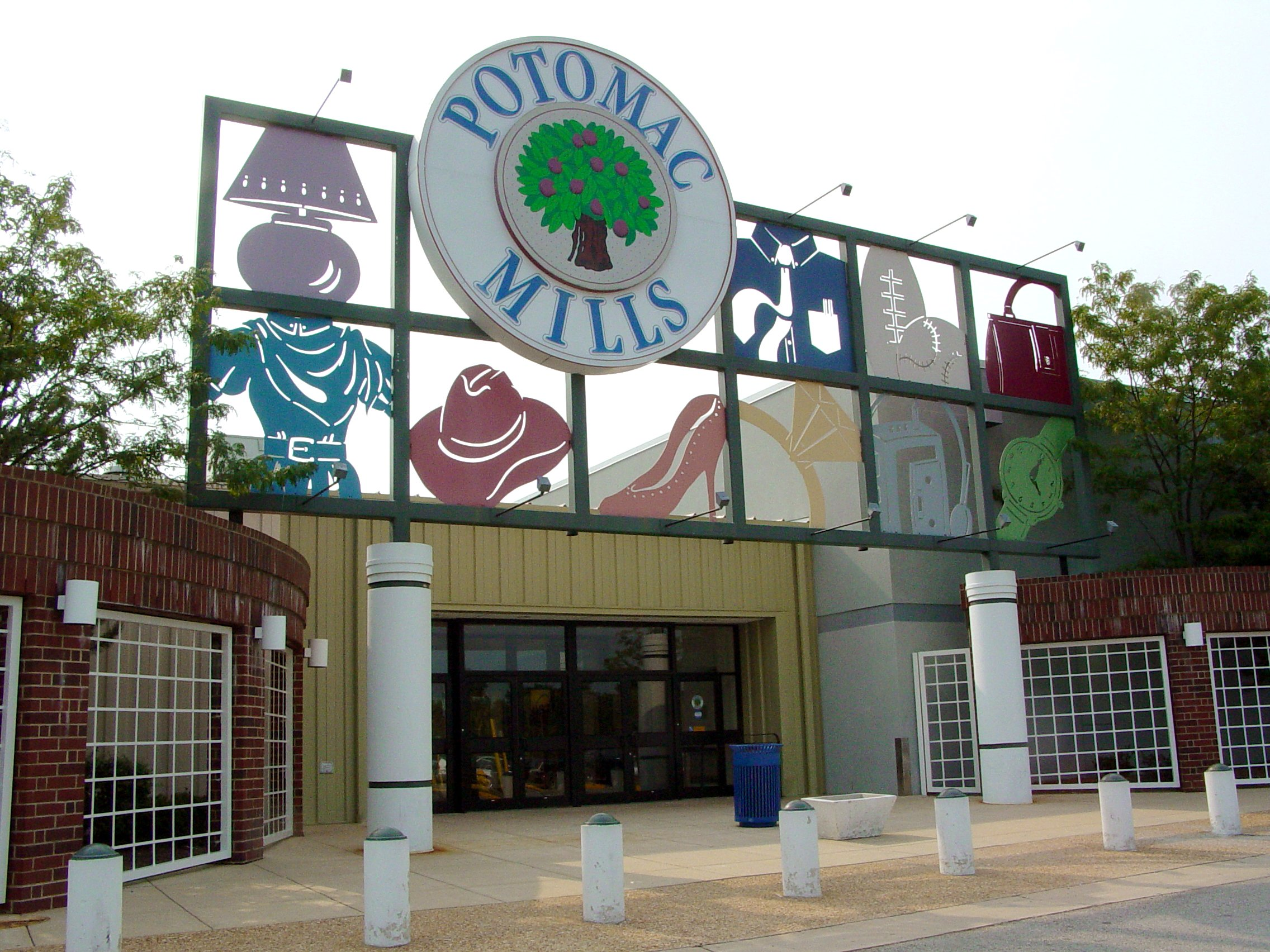
Potomac Mills in August 2005

- Marine Corps Base Quantico, a large military installation
- Hylton Performing Arts Center at George Mason University
- Jiffy Lube Live concert venue
- Potomac Mills, a tourist destination and largest outlet mall in the region
- FBI Academy, the Federal Bureau of Investigation's training and research facility.
- Camp William B. Snyder, one of the largest Cub Scout Camps in the United States.

== See also ==
- National Register of Historic Places listings in Prince William County, Virginia
- Prince William County Department of Fire and Rescue
- Prince William County Police Department
- Prince William County Sheriff's Office
- Splash Down Waterpark
