= West Gate, Prince William County, Virginia =

West Gate, Virginia
- unincorporated community & Former Census-designated place (CDP)
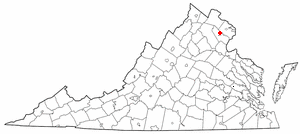
- Location of West Gate, Virginia
- Coordinates: 38°47′2″N 77°29′48″W
- Country: United States
- State: Virginia
- County: Prince William

Area
  - Total: 1.2 sq mi (3.0 km^{2})
  - Land: 1.2 sq mi (3.0 km^{2})
  - Water: 0 sq mi (0.0 km^{2})
- Elevation: 207 ft (63 m)

Population (2000)
  - Total: 7,493
  - Density: 6,388/sq mi (2,466.4/km^{2})
- Time zone: UTC−5 (Eastern (EST))
  - Summer (DST): UTC−4 (EDT)
- Area codes: 571, 703
- FIPS code: 51-84424
- GNIS feature ID: 1867601

West Gate is an unincorporated community and former census-designated place (CDP) in Prince William County, Virginia, United States. The population was 7,493 at the 2000 census. It contained the now-defunct Sunnybrook Golf Club.

== Geography ==
West Gate is located at 38°47′2″N 77°29′48″W (38.783909, −77.496778).

According to the United States Census Bureau, the CDP has a total area of 1.2 square miles (3.0 km^{2}), all land.

== Demographics ==
As of the census of 2000, there were 7,493 people, 2,473 households, and 1,706 families residing in the CDP. The population density was 6,388.1 inhabitants per square mile (2,466.5/km^{2}). There were 2,544 housing units at an average density of 2,168.9 per square mile (837.4/km^{2}). The racial makeup of the CDP was 56.25% White, 17.18% African American, 0.59% Native American, 3.98% Asian, 0.11% Pacific Islander, 17.06% from other races, and 4.84% from two or more races. Hispanic or Latino of any race were 26.20% of the population.

There were 2,473 households, out of which 38.8% had children under the age of 18 living with them, 49.6% were married couples living together, 13.3% had a female householder with no husband present, and 31.0% were non-families. 23.1% of all households were made up of individuals, and 7.8% had someone living alone who was 65 years of age or older. The average household size was 3.03 and the average family size was 3.53.

In the CDP, the population was spread out, with 29.2% under the age of 18, 11.0% from 18 to 24, 36.3% from 25 to 44, 16.5% from 45 to 64, and 6.8% who were 65 years of age or older. The median age was 30 years. For every 100 females, there were 104.5 males. For every 100 females age 18 and over, there were 102.3 males.

The median income for a household in the CDP was $48,242, and the median income for a family was $49,675. Males had a median income of $32,180 versus $26,043 for females. The per capita income for the CDP was $19,031. About 3.3% of families and 6.6% of the population were below the poverty line, including 5.5% of those under age 18 and 5.3% of those age 65 or over.
