= Splash Down Waterpark =

Waterpark in Sudley, Virginia

SplashDown Waterpark
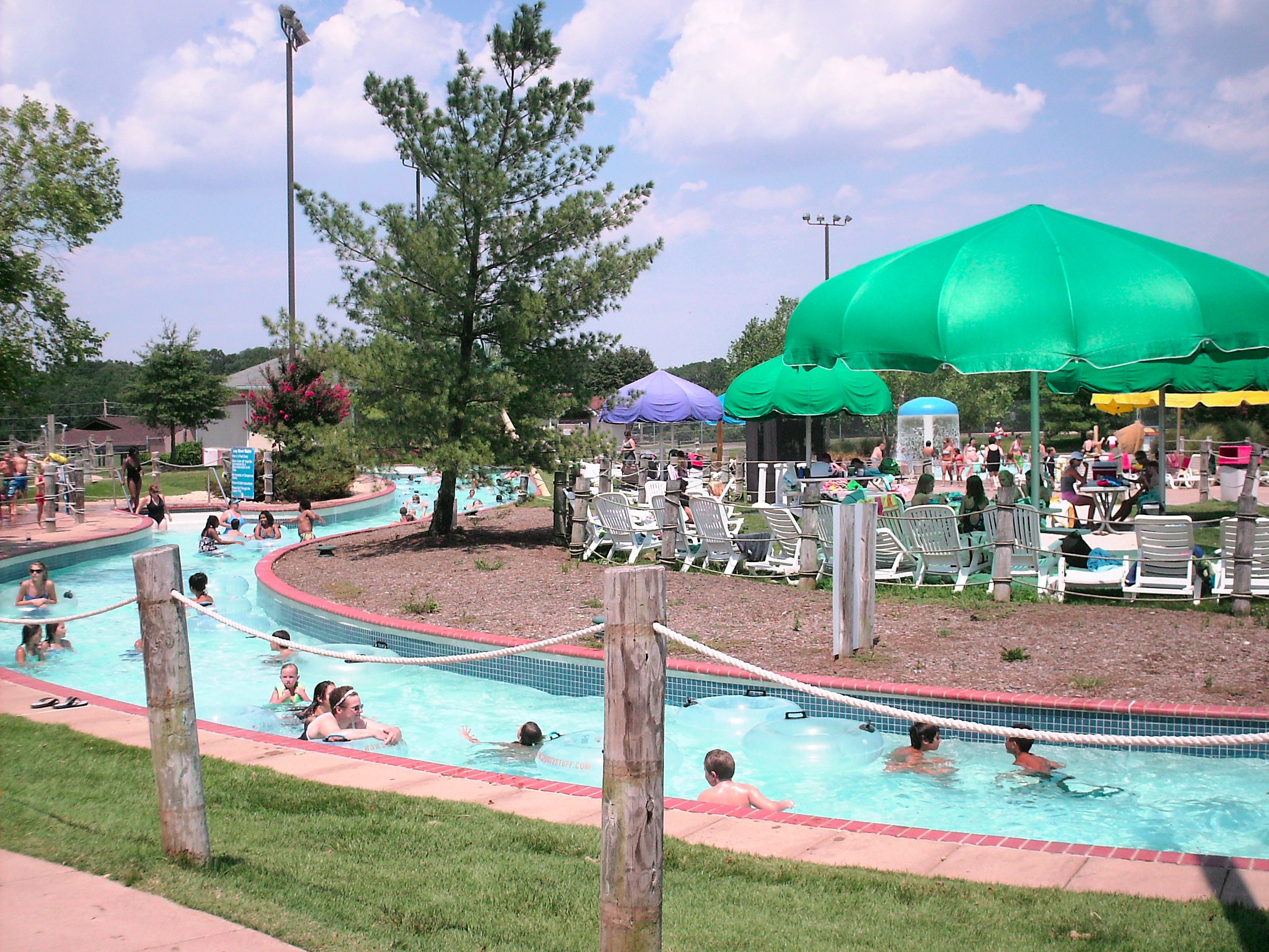
- Interactive map of SplashDown Waterpark
- Slogan: Like a Day at the Beach, Without the Drive
- Location: Sudley, Virginia, United States
- Coordinates: 38°47′39.3″N 77°28′38.5″W
- Operated by: Prince William County Parks, Recreation & Tourism
- General manager: Neil Oxendine
- Opened: May 1996
- Previous names: Ben Lomond Pool
- Area: 13 Acres
- Pools: 5 pools
- Water slides: 8 water slides
- Website: official website

SplashDown Waterpark, a waterpark located within Ben Lomond Regional Park in Sudley, Virginia (near Manassas), is operated by the Prince William County Department of Parks and Recreation. The park was built at the location of the Ben Lomond swimming pool, opening in May 1996. Among slides and wading pools, the facility also houses a 25-meter competition pool.

== Swimming team ==
SplashDown Waterpark is the home of the Ben Lomond Flying Ducks Swim Team.
