= Atlantic Ocean (band) =

Dutch trance/electronic duo

- Origin: Netherlands
- Genres: Trance
- Years active: 1993-
- Members: Rene van der Weyde; Lex van Coeverden

Atlantic Ocean is a Dutch trance/electronic duo, comprising Lex van Coeverden (born November 28, 1970) and Rene van der Weyde (born 10 August 1971).

The duo is most remembered for the hit single, "Waterfall". Five of their singles charted on the UK Singles Chart in the 1990s: "Waterfall", "Body in Motion", "Music Is a Passion", a remix of "Waterfall" and "The Cycle of Life". Further releases of "Waterfall" were made, though either failed or were ineligible for the chart. The band released several EPs including Lorelei, Pegasus, Set You Free and Trance-Atlantis. Ben Liebrand was responsible for making the 3D-animated videoclip for "Trance-Atlantis".

== "Waterfall" ==
The duo's first and most successful track was "Waterfall". It was originally released as a single in 1993. It is included on many Ministry of Sound compilation albums. In the track's original single release, three versions of the song were included. These were a radio edit, a tranquil mix and an original 12" edition.

The single reached number 22 on the UK Singles Chart in February 1994. A remixed version achieved one place better, peaking at 21 in November 1996.

The track has been remixed several times, most notably by ATB, Woody Van Eyden and Peter Parker. Dave Moreaux and Dennis Quin made the official 2011 version (released in August 2011).

"Don't Stop Now" by Lemon Jelly samples "Waterfall" (alternative name for this track is "'93", named after the year of release for "Waterfall"), from the album '64-'95.

== Discography ==
=== Studio albums ===
Title	Album details	Peak chart positions
Title	Album details	NED
Waterfall	Released: August 1994; Label: Clubstitute Records	32
"—" denotes items that did not chart or were not released in that territory.

=== Singles ===
Year	Title	Peak chart positions									Album
Year	Title	NED	AUS	BEL	FIN	GER	IRE	SCO	SWI	UK	Album
1994	"Waterfall"	3	111	14	—	—	9	22	—	22	Waterfall
1994	"Body in Motion"	14	129	45	11	—	11	20	40	15	Waterfall
1994	"Music Is a Passion"	—	—	—	—	—	—	71	—	59	Waterfall
1995	"Lorelei"	—	—	—	—	—	—	—	—	—	Non-album singles
1996	"Waterfall" (remix)	—	—	—	—	—	29	27	—	21	Non-album singles
1997	"The Cycle of Life"	—	—	—	—	—	—	—	—	77	Non-album singles
1999	"Trance-Atlantis"	—	—	—	—	—	—	—	—	—	Non-album singles
2002	"Waterfall 2002"	—	—	—	—	84	—	—	—	122	Non-album singles
2009	"Waterfall 2009"	21	—	—	—	—	—	—	—	—	Non-album singles
"—" denotes items that did not chart or were not released in that territory.
