= Vivo NEX 3 =

2019 Android smartphones

Vivo NEX 3 Vivo NEX 3 5G
- Developer: Vivo
- Manufacturer: Vivo
- Series: NEX
- First released: September 2019
- Predecessor: Vivo NEX Dual Display
- Successor: Vivo NEX 3S
- Compatible networks: 2G; 3G; 4G; LTE
- Form factor: Slate
- Dimensions: H: 167.4 mm (6.59 in); W: 76.1 mm (3.00 in); D: 9.4 mm (0.37 in)
- Weight: 217.3 g (7.67 oz); 218.5 g (7.71 oz) (5G)
- Operating system: Android 9.0 "Pie", Funtouch OS 9.1
- System-on-chip: Qualcomm Snapdragon 855+
- CPU: Octa-core (1 × 2.96 GHz, 3 × 2.42 GHz, 4 × 1.78 GHz) Kryo
- GPU: Adreno 640
- Memory: 8 GB RAM; 8 or 12 GB RAM (5G)
- Storage: 128 GB; 256 GB (5G)
- Battery: 4500 mAh
- Rear camera: Triple: 64 MP (wide), 13 MP (telephoto), 13 MP (ultrawide); f/1.8, f/2.5, f/2.2 aperture; LED flash, HDR, PDAF, panorama; Slow-motion HD 720p video (up to 960 FPS); FHD 1080p video (up to 30/60/120 FPS); 4K 2160p video (up to 30 FPS)
- Front camera: Motorized pop-up 16 MP, f/2.1 FHD 1080p (up to 30 FPS)
- Display: 6.89 in (175 mm) FHD+ Super AMOLED, 2256 × 1080 (363 ppi)
- Connectivity: GSM, LTE, LTE Advanced, HSDPA, CDMA, 5G (optional)
- Data inputs: Sensors: Accelerometer; Compass; Fingerprint scanner (under display); Gyroscope; Proximity sensor
- Website: www.vivo.com/en/products/nex3

The Vivo NEX 3 and Vivo NEX 3 5G are Android phablets developed by Vivo which were unveiled on 16 September 2019.

== Specifications ==
=== Design ===
The NEX 3 and NEX 3 5G both have an aluminum frame and curved Gorilla Glass on the back and Schott Xensation® Up glass on the front. The curved edges of the display do not allow for physical power and volume buttons; pressure-sensitive haptic keys are implemented instead. A small button at the top of the device is situated next to the pop-up camera mechanism and is used for hard reset and screen lock only.

=== Hardware & Software ===
Internally, the Snapdragon 855+ and Adreno 640 are used, with a 4500 mAh battery powering both. The 5G model also has a vapor chamber dedicated to the modem. The NEX 3 is available with 128 GB of non-expandable UFS 3.0 storage and 8 GB of RAM, while the NEX 3 5G is available with 256 GB of non-expandable UFS 3.0 storage and 8 or 12 GB of RAM. Both can quick charge at 44W via USB-C, but do not have wireless charging. Biometric options comprise an updated in-display optical fingerprint reader and facial recognition. The phones' rear cameras are housed in a centered circular module, consisting of a 64 MP main sensor, a 13 MP ultrawide sensor and a 13 telephoto sensor. A pop-up camera hides the 16 MP front sensor and a flash. The mechanism has been improved and is now faster and more durable, taking 0.65 seconds to operate. Both devices have one screen, lacking their predecessor's dual-screen functionality. The Vivo NEX 3 and NEX 3 5G have a 6.89" (175mm) FHD+ HDR10 display with a resolution of 1080 x 2256 pixels and a screen-body ratio of 93.6%. A Samsung-made Super AMOLED panel is used on both with a curved "Waterfall" design akin to the Mate 30 Pro's. Edge detection and palm rejection are implemented to prevent accidental touches. The phones' rear cameras are housed in a centered circular module, consisting of a 64 MP main sensor, a 13 MP ultrawide sensor and a 13 telephoto sensor. OIS is not present on any of the sensors. A pop-up camera hides the 16 MP front sensor and a flash. The mechanism has been improved and is now faster and more durable, taking 0.65 seconds to operate. Both phones run on Android 9.0 "Pie" with Vivo's Funtouch 9.1 skin.

== Successor ==
Vivo announced the NEX 3S 5G on 10 March 2020 as a hardware revision of the NEX 3 5G. The device features an upgraded Snapdragon 865 SoC, Android 10 with Funtouch 10 and HDR10+ support for the display, and benefits from newer LPDDR5 RAM, UFS 3.1 and Bluetooth 5.1. The design remains the same, although there is now an orange color variant.
