= Tacketts Mill, Virginia =

Unincorporated community in Virginia, US

Coordinates: 38°30′22″N 77°33′50″W

Tacketts Mill is an unincorporated community in Stafford County, in the U.S. state of Virginia.

== History ==
=== Settlement through mid-1800s ===
Tacketts Mill was originally settled as part of the Tackett (Tacquette) land grant in the late 1600s. Tackett's Mill was one of the earliest mills in Stafford County and was originally built to serve the Huguenot populace that began settling Stafford County in the late 1600s. The Tackett name was an Anglicized version of the French name Tacquette, according to John Tackett Goolrick's, The Story of Stafford. Goolrick places the building of Tacketts mill in the early 1700s. According to tax records in Stafford County's public records the original land grant was in excess of 350 acres of land. It may well have been much larger. The mill and its surrounding property included a grist mill, a saw mill and a textile manufacturing mill as well as a school for girls and a store which was the only store that served the area during the middle parts of 19th century. According to the Stafford County Historical and Archeological Committee's book, Foundation Stones of Stafford County, Virginia, Volume II, Tackett renewed an insurance policy for his mill in 1816 and by 1820 had insured two mills. To this day the road that crosses Aquia Creek in that vicinity is known as Tacketts Mill Road. The original mill had an overshot wheel and was powered by water. The crumbled stone foundation of the original mill still exists as do remnants of the mill race. This mill also went by the names of Skinner's Mill (willed to Lawrence Skinner after Tackett's death and then owned by Peter Goolrick of Goolricks in Fredericksburg). This mill was considered the "center of the universe" in far western Stafford during the 1800s.

Tacketts Mill, besides being a commercial enterprise, also describes the local, unincorporated area. On February 27, 1837, the Virginia General Assembly passed an act stating that a separate polling station will be opened "at a storehouse, near the mill called Tackett's." In 1855–56 the Virginia General Assembly recognized Tacketts Mill as a separate voting precinct within Stafford County. Also in 1856, Tacketts Mill is listed in the Post Office Directory. David W. Combs is listed as the postmaster with an annual salary of $10.57. It was listed again as a separate precinct in 1862 by the Commonwealth's General Assembly, when Virginia was a Confederate State. Even modern maps show the area as Tacketts Mill, in spite of the fact that there is no longer a mill or a separate voting precinct and the closest Post Office is in nearby Ruby.

=== American Civil War ===
Both Union and Confederate forces moved through this area and it can be assumed that the mill complex was alternately occupied by each. A mill producing food, clothing and ammunition would be a strategic target for both sides. John E. Tackett is listed in Virginia at War, 1862, by William C. Davis, James I. Robertson, as being one of 121 producers of woolen goods that could be used to clothe the Confederate Army. There is mention in Confederate Industry, by Harold S. Wilson, that Tackett may have been commissioned to supply wool blankets for the Confederate Army.

According to The Fire Within: A Civil War Narrative from Wisconsin, by Kerry Trask, Wisconsin elements of the "Iron Brigade" of the Army of the Potomac arrived at Tacketts Mill on November 18, 1862, expecting to go into winter quarters, but were soon ordered south in the attack on Fredericksburg the following month, December 1862. They may have encamped just south of the mill and the bridge spanning Aquia Creek, which would be the area around the still extant farm house and across the road from the farm house, now containing a widely spaced sub-division called Mill Brook.

Union dispatches from the civil war describe the area of Tacketts Mill as being on the outer edges of the Army of the Potomac's Area of Operations. At that time the area was a virtual "no-man's land". Union forces moved up and down the Potomac River to the east of Tacketts Mill and along the Warrenton Road to the south, during campaigns in the area. In April, 1864, a number of dispatches between Major General Philip Sheridan, Commander of the Cavalry Corps of the Army of the Potomac, and Brigadier General Gregg, Commander of the Second US Cavalry Division in Warrenton, VA, ordered that US Cavalry scouts be sent to "the vicinity of Grove Church, United States Ford, Stafford Courthouse and Tackett's Mill" to deal with "numerous rebel scouts," and that, "Major General Meade is exceedingly anxious to have them driven from the country, killed, or captured, and directs the officer in command to be very vigilant, and to collect as much information as possible of the enemy." Numerous other dispatches from April, 1864, direct Union Cavalry to send scouts "as far out as Tackett's Mills", seeming to confirm the belief that Tacketts Mill was the outer edge of the area under Union control.

A passage in volume 28 of Confederate Veteran Magazine, published in 1920, entitled "Scouting in Lee's Army", by William Johnson of Warrenton, VA, describes the author's activities as a Confederate scout in 1863. According to his story he crossed the Rappahannock River from Culpeper, VA, and met up with a number of other Confederate scouts at Tackett's Mill. From here he and another scout struck North with the intent to capture some Union troops, which they ultimately did.

Far downstream on Aquia Creek from Tacketts Mill is Aquia Landing, a port on the Potomac River used extensively by Union forces as a logistics base and a power projection platform for Union forces moving south. It was also a holding area for captured Confederate troops being sent north to more notable prison camps.

=== Post-war ===
Tacketts Mill appears in several post-war records in the Stafford County Courthouse tax and property records through the late 1800s. Clearly, the mills continued to operate even in the deeply depressed reconstruction era. In the December, 1892, edition of the periodical, "Farm Journal", E. L. S. of Tacketts Mill wrote in to ask a question about raising chickens. According to the "Electrical Review", a national listing of telephone companies and telephone lines, Tacketts Mill received its first telephone line in 1905. In 1910 Tacketts Mill is listed in the Virginia Department of Agriculture's list of corn and wheat mills with a capacity of 100 bushels of corn meal per day. In the same year the publication, "The Operative Miller" lists L. A. Skinner and Son, operators of Tacketts Mill, as having purchased a steel, overshot water wheel, 14 feet in diameter by 3 foot face, from the Fitz Water Wheel Company. It is highly likely that this steel water wheel is the same one donated by the Emerts to the Tacketts Mill shopping center in Woodbridge, (which was subsequently never used) and is pictured on page 67 of "Stafford County, Then & Now", by Anita L. Dodd and M. Amanda Lee. In 1914, L. A. Skinner is listed by the Virginia Secretary of the Commonwealth as the Constable of Tacketts Mill in the Rock Hill Magistrate. In 1942 the property was purchased by the Gutches family and the place was known as Gracewood. The mill was still standing, but in disrepair. Mr. Gutches sold some lumber off of the land and as payment had the lumber cut to repair the mill, including the 12" x 12" support beams. As it turned out, however, no one was willing to do the repair work. He contacted all of the local historical societies and no one was interested in the mill. Over the years the mill continued to deteriorate and eventually collapsed. The lumber Mr. Gutches had prepared for the repair work stood outside and eventually rotted away. The portion of the property the mill stood on was sold and the subsequent owners, the Ermerts, donated the mill's remnants.
