= Occoquan Bay National Wildlife Refuge =

United States National Wildlife Refuge in Virginia

- IUCN category IV (habitat/species management area)
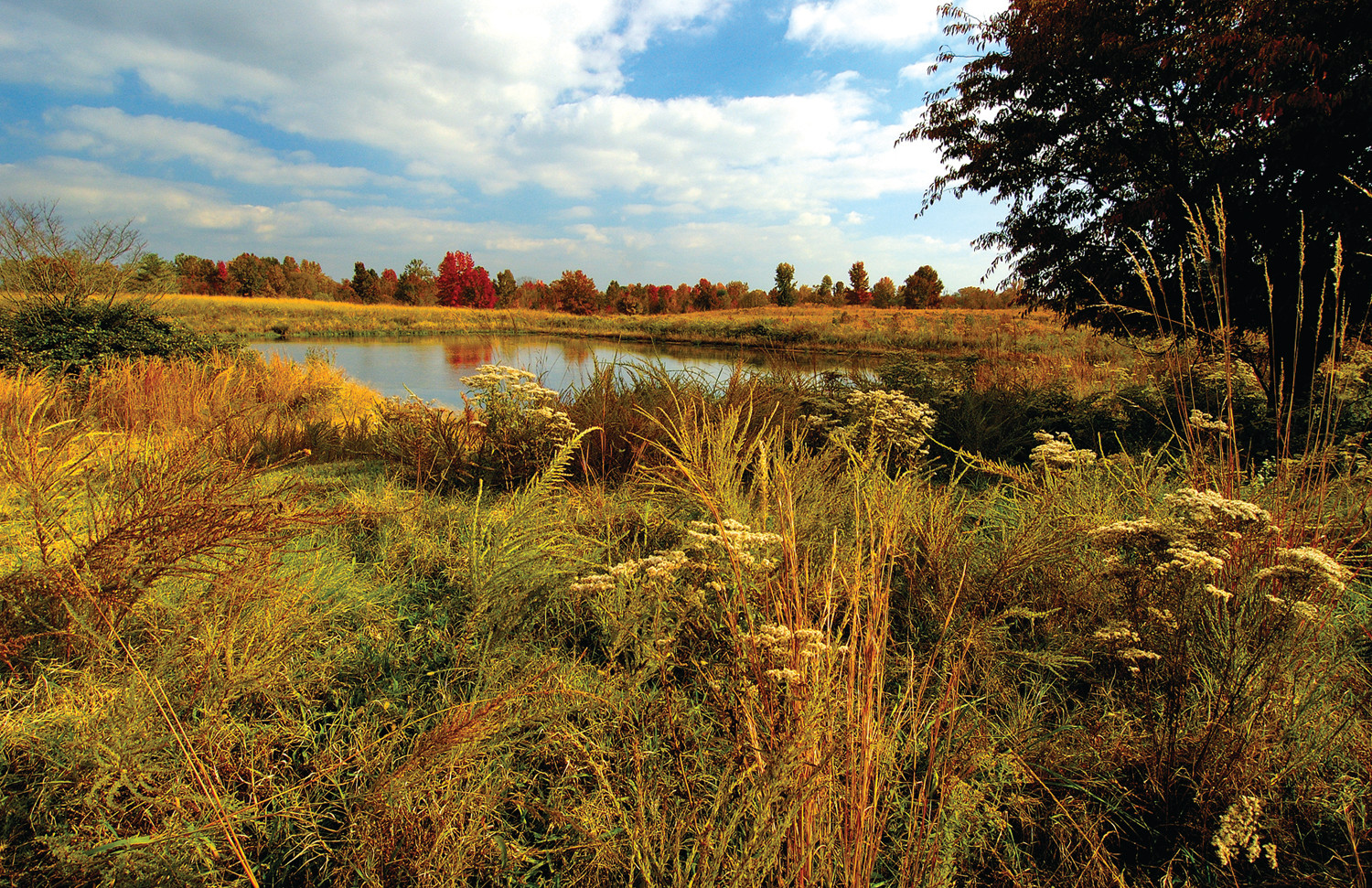

- Location within Northern Virginia Location within Virginia Location within the United States
- Location: Prince William County, Virginia, United States
- Nearest city: Woodbridge, Virginia
- Coordinates: 38°38′39″N 77°14′09″W
- Area: 644 acres (261 ha)
- Established: 1998
- Governing body: U.S. Fish and Wildlife Service
- Website: Occoquan Bay National Wildlife Refuge

The Occoquan Bay National Wildlife Refuge is a National Wildlife Refuge located where the Occoquan River meets the Potomac River in Woodbridge, Virginia, United States between Belmont Bay and Occoquan Bay. The 644-acre (2.61 km^{2}) site, about half of which is wetlands, was a popular tourist spot known as Dawson Beach until the 1940s, after which it was used for military research by the U.S. Army's Harry Diamond Laboratories from the 1960s to the 1990s. When the land was purchased from the military, it was temporarily called the Marumsco National Wildlife Refuge. The refuge was formally established and renamed in 1998, and is now managed by the United States Fish and Wildlife Service as part of the Potomac River National Wildlife Refuge Complex.

== Geography and biodiversity ==
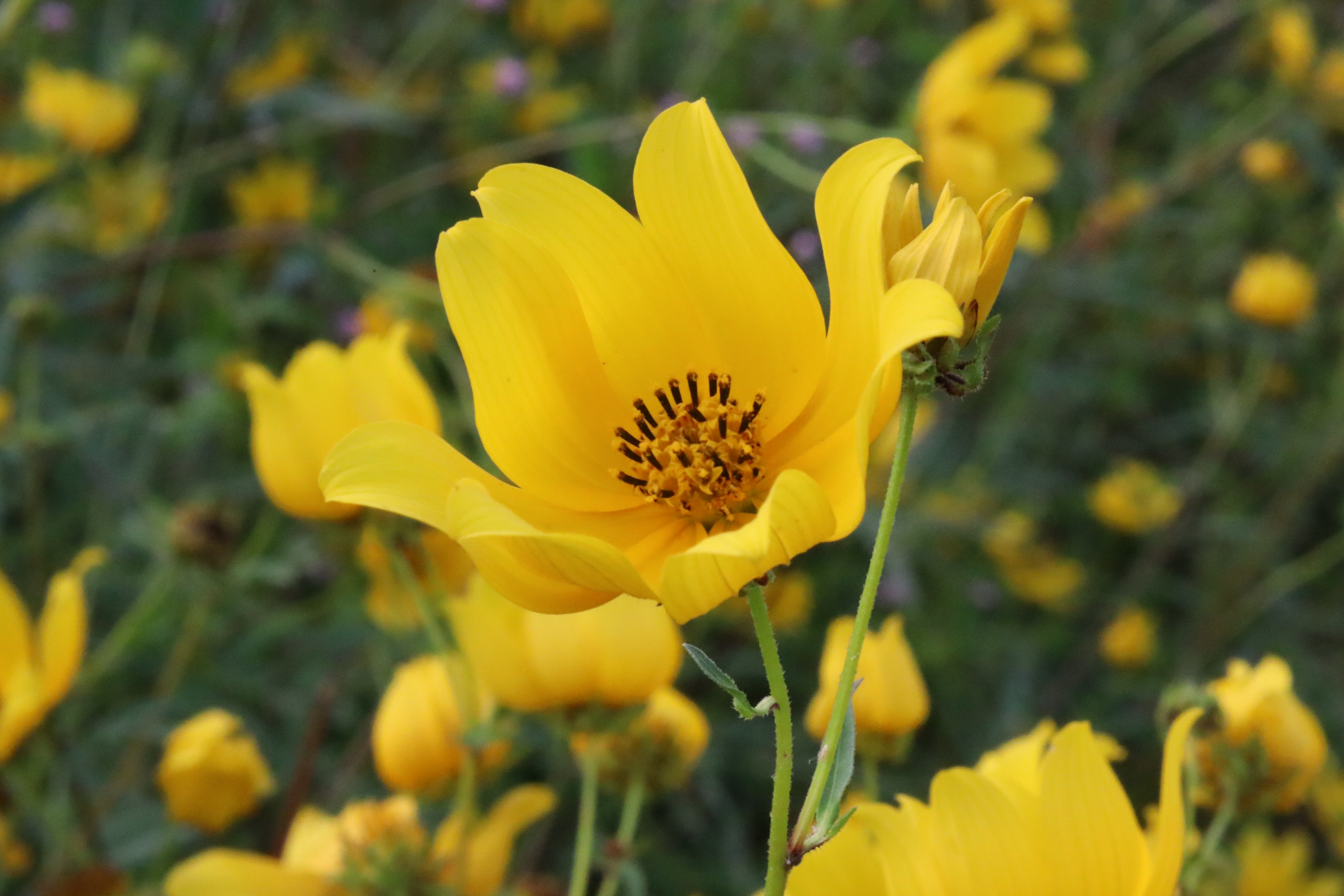
Wildflowers in the refuge

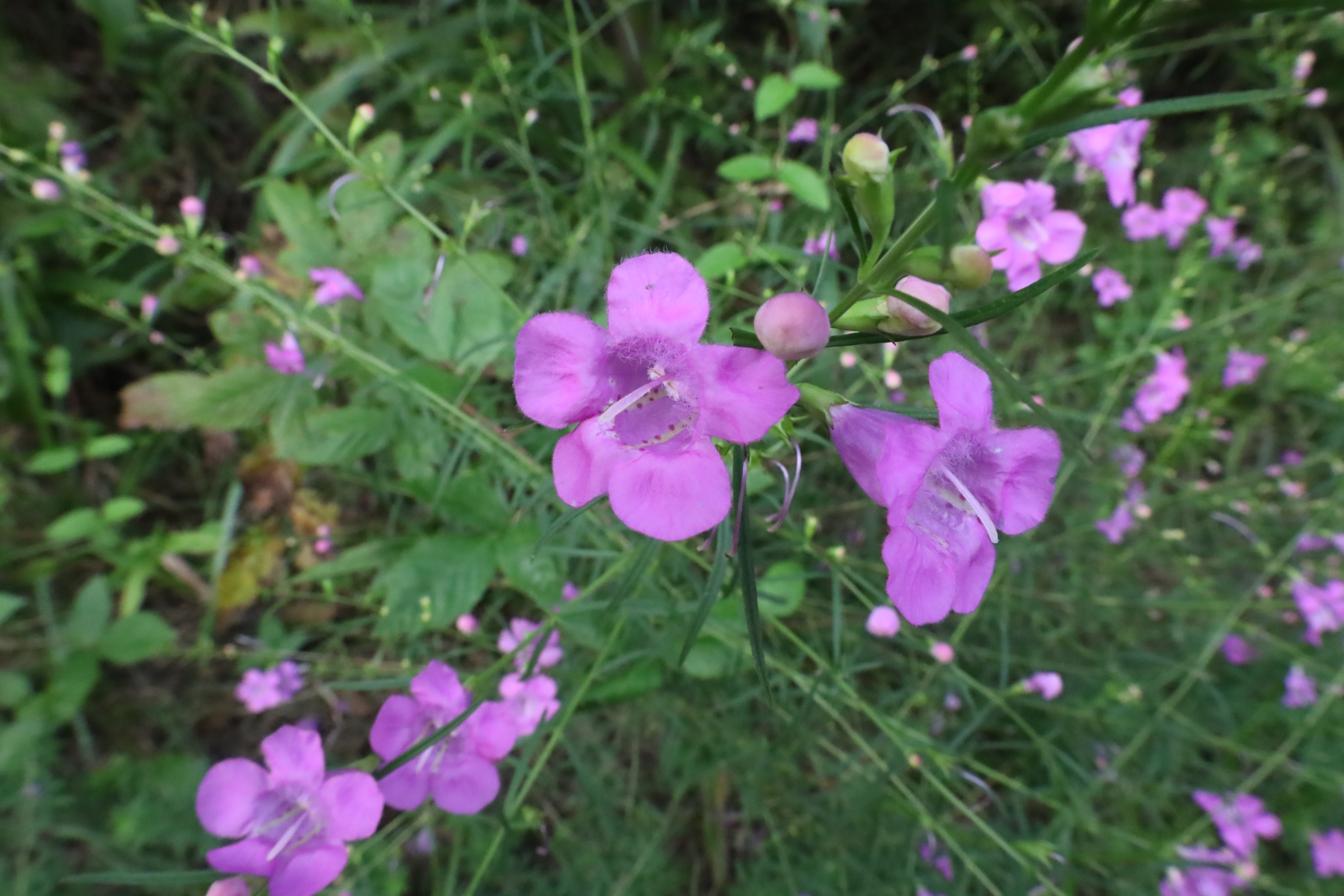
Wildflowers in the refuge

When the Army obtained the site in 1950 for use as a radio transmitting station, fields of antennas replaced cows and crops. In the 1970s, the base's mission shifted to top secret research. Electromagnetic pulse testing and sight lines for security kept the vegetation low, primarily in grasslands. When the base closed in the 1990s, the U.S. Fish and Wildlife Service was able to continue to preserve these grasslands as wildlife habitat.

The refuge has a mix of wetlands, forest, and native grasslands that provides a diversity of habitats for wide variety of species. Wetland habitats cover about 50% of the refuge and include wet meadows, bottomland hardwoods, open freshwater marsh, and tidally influenced marshes and streams. Upland meadows and mature oak-hickory-beech forest are interspersed among the wetlands. The unusual number and interspersion of habitats provides visitors an opportunity to view a wide variety of wildlife species and habitats in a relatively small area. Noted for its grassland nesting birds, neo-tropical migrants and raptors, the refuge also hosts wildlife common to Virginia. Over 220 species of birds, over 600 species of plants, and 65 species of butterflies have been documented on the refuge. Many of the bird species are uncommon or rare in the region.

== Visiting ==
Approximately four miles (6.4 km) of old patrol roads are reserved for foot traffic, rotating between three two-mile (3.2 km) loops. Information is posted at the visitor contact station and at trail heads. Wildlife Drive also contains two miles (3.2 km) of old patrol roads reserved for motor vehicle and bicycle access. Vehicles can serve as a mobile blind, allowing visitors closer views; the blind effect is also why drivers and passengers must stay in their vehicles while on the drive.
