= Waterfall, Virginia =

Unincorporated community in Virginia, US

Coordinates: 38°51′44″N 77°40′18″W

Waterfall, Virginia is an unincorporated community located in Western Prince William County, Virginia. Waterfall () sits at the foot of Bull Run Mountains, the easternmost front of the Blue Ridge Mountains.
