= National Register of Historic Places listings in Prince William County, Virginia =

Location of Prince William County in Virginia

This is a list of the National Register of Historic Places listings in Prince William County, Virginia.

This is intended to be a complete list of the properties and districts on the National Register of Historic Places in Prince William County, Virginia, United States. The locations of National Register properties and districts for which the latitude and longitude coordinates are included below, may be seen in an online map.

There are 45 properties and districts listed on the National Register in the county.

This National Park Service list is complete through NPS recent listings posted March 6, 2026.

== Current listings ==
	Name on the Register	Image	Date listed	Location	City or town	Description
1	Bel Air	Bel Air	February 26, 1970 (#70000823)	General Washington Dr. 38°38′26″N 77°21′47″W	Dale City	Historic plantation manor house built c. 1740 by Charles Ewell. It was the home of Mason Locke Weems (1759 – 1825), the first biographer of George Washington and the creator of the George Washington cherry tree story ("I cannot tell a lie, I did it with my little hatchet"). It is one of the few remaining colonial era plantation homes in northern Virginia.
2	Ben Lomond	Ben Lomond	July 30, 1980 (#80004214)	Northwest of Manassas at 10914 Sudley Manor Dr. 38°47′20″N 77°30′23″W	Bull Run	
3	Beverley Mill	Beverley Mill	February 23, 1972 (#72001411)	Junction of State Route 55 and Beverleys Mill Rd. 38°49′28″N 77°42′38″W	The Plains	
4	Brentsville Courthouse and Jail	Brentsville Courthouse and Jail	August 18, 1989 (#89001060)	12239 and 12249 Bristow Rd. 38°41′23″N 77°30′00″W	Brentsville	
5	Brentsville Historic District	Brentsville Historic District	December 21, 1990 (#90001829)	Roughly Bristow Rd. from Old Church Rd. to Isaac Walton Rd. 38°41′23″N 77°30′06″W	Bristow	
6	Broad Run-Little Georgetown Rural Historic District	Broad Run-Little Georgetown Rural Historic District	April 21, 2016 (#16000205)	Roughly bounded by The Plains, Bull Run Mountains, State Route 55, Bust Head Rd., and Hopewell Rd. 38°49′28″N 77°42′37″W	Broad Run	Extends into Fauquier County; only a small portion is in Prince William County.
7	Buckland Historic District	Buckland Historic District	June 17, 1988 (#88000681)	7980-8205 Buckland Mill Rd. and 16206, 16208, 16210, and 16211 U.S. Routes 15/29; also parts of Buckland Mill and Cerro Gordo Rds., and U.S. Routes 15/29; 38°46′50″N 77°40′29″W	Buckland	Second set of addresses represents a boundary increase of March 27, 2008
8	Cabin Branch Pyrite Mine Historic District	Cabin Branch Pyrite Mine Historic District	December 12, 2002 (#02001517)	Prince William Forest Park; 38°34′39″N 77°21′13″W	Triangle	
9	Camp French		November 12, 2008 (#08001055)	Fuller Rd. on the Medal of Honor Golf Course; 38°31′48″N 77°18′20″W	Marine Corps Base Quantico	
10	Commanding General's Quarters, Quantico Marine Base	Commanding General's Quarters, Quantico Marine Base	July 17, 2009 (#09000540)	100 block of Neville Rd. at Quantico Marine Base; 38°31′36″N 77°18′01″W	Quantico	
11	Davis-Beard House	Davis-Beard House	November 9, 1989 (#89001794)	10726 Bristow Rd. 38°43′24″N 77°32′13″W	Bristow	
12	Effingham	Effingham	November 9, 1989 (#89001793)	14103 Aden Rd. 38°38′17″N 77°31′20″W	Aden	
13	Evergreen	Evergreen	March 27, 2008 (#08000247)	15900 Berkeley Dr. 38°53′02″N 77°39′42″W	Haymarket	
14	Freestone Point Confederate Battery	Freestone Point Confederate Battery	August 18, 1989 (#89001059)	At the Potomac River off Neabsco Rd. in Leesylvania State Park; 38°35′34″N 77°14′57″W	Woodbridge	
15	Goodwill Historic District, Chopawamsic RDA Camp 1	Goodwill Historic District, Chopawamsic RDA Camp 1	June 12, 1989 (#89000456)	Off State Route 234 west of Interstate 95; 38°35′49″N 77°21′23″W	Triangle	
16	Greenwich Presbyterian Church and Cemetery	Greenwich Presbyterian Church and Cemetery	August 18, 1989 (#89001065)	9510 Burwell Rd. 38°44′56″N 77°38′52″W	Greenwich	
17	The Lawn	The Lawn	October 30, 1989 (#89001798)	15027 State Route 215; 38°44′59″N 77°38′43″W	Nokesville	
18	Leesylvania Archeological Site (44PW7)	Leesylvania Archeological Site (44PW7)	September 13, 1984 (#84003565)	Leesylvania State Park; 38°35′39″N 77°15′21″W	Dumfries	
19	Locust Bottom	Locust Bottom	February 11, 1991 (#89001796)	2520 Logmill Rd. 38°53′38″N 77°38′27″W	Haymarket	
20	Manassas National Battlefield Park	Manassas National Battlefield Park	October 15, 1966 (#66000039)	Less than 1 mile (1.6 km) east of Gainesville, approximately 5 miles (8.0 km) northwest of Manassas off State Route 215; 38°48′46″N 77°31′18″W	Gainesville	Extends into Fairfax County
21	Mawavi Historic District, Chopawamsic RDA Camp 2	Mawavi Historic District, Chopawamsic RDA Camp 2	June 12, 1989 (#89000457)	Off Joplin Rd. west of Interstate 95; 38°34′53″N 77°24′57″W	Triangle	
22	Mitchell's Ford Entrenchments	Mitchell's Ford Entrenchments	August 8, 1989 (#89001064)	Bull Run east of Manassas Park; 38°47′45″N 77°27′13″W	Manassas Park	Near Manassas Park, but in the county
23	Moor Green	Moor Green	November 17, 1978 (#78003039)	1.3 miles (2.1 km) north of Brentsville off Lucasville Rd. 38°42′26″N 77°29′47″W	Brentsville	
24	Mt. Atlas	Mt. Atlas	October 30, 1989 (#89001799)	4105 Mt. Atlas Ln. 38°52′07″N 77°39′46″W	Haymarket	
25	Mount Pleasant Baptist Church and Cemetery	Mount Pleasant Baptist Church and Cemetery	February 19, 2021 (#100006159)	15008 Lee Hwy. 38°47′23″N 77°38′17″W	Gainesville	
26	Nokesville Truss Bridge	Nokesville Truss Bridge	April 15, 1978 (#78003040)	Northeast of Nokesville on Aden Rd. 38°42′25″N 77°33′52″W	Nokesville	
27	Occoquan Historic District	Occoquan Historic District	October 6, 1983 (#83004255)	Roughly bounded by the Occoquan River, Center Lane, Washington St., and the western end of Mill St. 38°41′02″N 77°15′41″W	Occoquan	
28	Old Hotel	Old Hotel	November 12, 1969 (#69000273)	U.S. Route 1; 38°34′09″N 77°19′23″W	Dumfries	
29	Old Town Hall and School	Old Town Hall and School	March 1, 2011 (#11000063)	15025 Washington St. 38°48′44″N 77°38′14″W	Haymarket	Now the Haymarket Museum
30	Orange and Alexandria Railroad Bridge Piers	Orange and Alexandria Railroad Bridge Piers	August 8, 1989 (#89001061)	Both sides of Bull Run just east of Manassas Park; 38°46′36″N 77°25′19″W	Manassas Park	Extends into Fairfax County
31	Orenda/SP-26 Historic District, Chopawamsic RDA Camp 3	Orenda/SP-26 Historic District, Chopawamsic RDA Camp 3	June 12, 1989 (#89000458)	Off Joplin Rd. west of Interstate 95; 38°33′48″N 77°21′34″W	Triangle	
32	Park Gate	Park Gate	April 3, 1987 (#87000580)	11508 Park Gate Dr. 38°40′45″N 77°32′38″W	Nokesville	
33	Pilgrim's Rest	Pilgrim's Rest	October 30, 1989 (#89001797)	14102 Carriage Ford Rd.; also 2101 Belmont Grove Rd. 38°39′00″N 77°35′34″W	Nokesville	Belmont Grove represents a boundary increase of January 16, 2004
34	Pleasant Historic District, Chopawamsic RDA Camp 4	Pleasant Historic District, Chopawamsic RDA Camp 4	June 12, 1989 (#89000459)	Off State Route 234 west of Interstate 95; 38°35′25″N 77°21′18″W	Triangle	
35	Prince William County Courthouse	Prince William County Courthouse	February 11, 2004 (#04000039)	9248 Lee Ave. 38°45′09″N 77°28′34″W	Manassas	In a small county enclave surrounded by the city of Manassas
36	Prince William Forest Park Historic District	Prince William Forest Park Historic District	April 3, 2012 (#12000179)	18100 Park Headquarters Rd. 38°33′36″N 77°20′50″W	Triangle	
37	Quantico Marine Corps Base Historic District	Quantico Marine Corps Base Historic District	March 26, 2001 (#01000260)	Marine Corps Base Quantico; 38°31′20″N 77°17′24″W	Quantico	Extends into Stafford County
38	Rippon Lodge	Rippon Lodge	July 2, 1971 (#71000988)	0.8 miles (1.3 km) south of the junction of U.S. Route 1 and Rippon Boulevard; 38°36′53″N 77°16′42″W	Woodbridge	
39	Rising Hill Camp		November 12, 2008 (#08001057)	West of the junction of Neville Rd. and Draper St. 38°31′25″N 77°17′53″W	Marine Corps Base Quantico	
40	Rockledge	Rockledge	June 25, 1973 (#73002051)	Telegraph Rd. 38°41′06″N 77°15′44″W	Occoquan	
41	St. Paul's Episcopal Church	St. Paul's Episcopal Church	January 20, 1975 (#75002031)	Off State Route 55; 38°48′38″N 77°38′21″W	Haymarket	
42	Signal Hill	Signal Hill	August 8, 1989 (#89001062)	9301 Signal View Rd. 38°45′05″N 77°26′18″W	Manassas	Near Manassas, but east of the city limits. Across from Signal Hill Park.
43	Thoroughfare Gap Battlefield	Thoroughfare Gap Battlefield	November 18, 1999 (#99001374)	Junction of Interstate 66 and State Route 55; 38°49′27″N 77°42′30″W	Broad Run	Extends into Fauquier County
44	Weems-Botts House	Weems-Botts House	May 12, 1975 (#75002029)	Southwestern corner of the junction of Duke and Cameron Sts. 38°34′07″N 77°19′45″W	Dumfries	
45	White House	White House	October 30, 1989 (#89001795)	12320 Bristow Rd. 38°41′19″N 77°29′58″W	Brentsville	

== See also ==
- List of National Historic Landmarks in Virginia
- National Register of Historic Places listings in Virginia
