= Pilgrim's Rest =

Pilgrim's Rest or Pilgrims Rest may refer to:

== South Africa ==
- Pilgrim's Rest, Mpumalanga, a town

== United States ==
- Pilgrims Rest, Alabama
- Pilgrim's Rest, Arkansas
- Pilgrim's Rest (Enterprise, Mississippi), listed on the NRHP in Mississippi
- Pilgrim's Rest (Nokesville, Virginia), listed on the NRHP in Virginia

== Other ==
- Pilgrim's Rest (novel), a 1922 novel by the British writer Francis Brett Young
- Pilgrim's Rest (TV series), a sitcom shown on British TV
