= Rising Hill Camp =

Archaeological site in Virginia, United States

- U.S. National Register of Historic Places
- Nearest city: Marine Corps Base Quantico, Prince William County, Virginia
- Area: 1.7 acres (0.69 ha)
- Built: 1861
- MPS: Campaigns for the Control of Navigation on the Lower Potomac River, 1861-1862, Virginia, Maryland, and DC, MPS
- NRHP reference No.: 08001057
- Added to NRHP: November 12, 2008

The Rising Hill Camp is an historic Confederate Army encampment, now located on the grounds of the Marine Corps Base Quantico in Prince William County, Virginia. The 1.7-acre (0.69 ha) site is believed to have been used by the 47th Virginia and 22nd North Carolina Regiments in connection with the operation of a battery at the top of a rise that was labeled "Rising Hill" on Union maps. The site consists rows of hut pits, at least 86 in number, arrayed down the western slope of a ridge. Although test pits have been dug by archaeologists, the site has not been investigated in detail.

The camp site was listed on the National Register of Historic Places in 2008.

== See also ==
- National Register of Historic Places listings in Prince William County, Virginia
