= Virginia State Route 215 =

State highway in northern Virginia, US

State Route 215
- Vint Hill Road

Route information
- Maintained by VDOT
- Length: 9.26 mi (14.90 km)
- Existed: 1961–present

Major junctions
- West end: US 15 / US 29 at Buckland
- East end: SR 28 near Bristow

Location
- Country: United States
- State: Virginia
- Counties: Fauquier, Prince William

Highway system
- Virginia Routes; Interstate; US; Primary; Secondary; Byways; History; HOT lanes
| ← SR 214 | → SR 216 |

State Route 215 (SR 215) is a primary state highway in the U.S. state of Virginia. Known as Vint Hill Road, the state highway runs 9.26 miles (14.90 km) from U.S. Route 15 and US 29 at Buckland east to SR 28 near Bristow. SR 215 forms part of a connection between Warrenton and Manassas.

== Route description ==
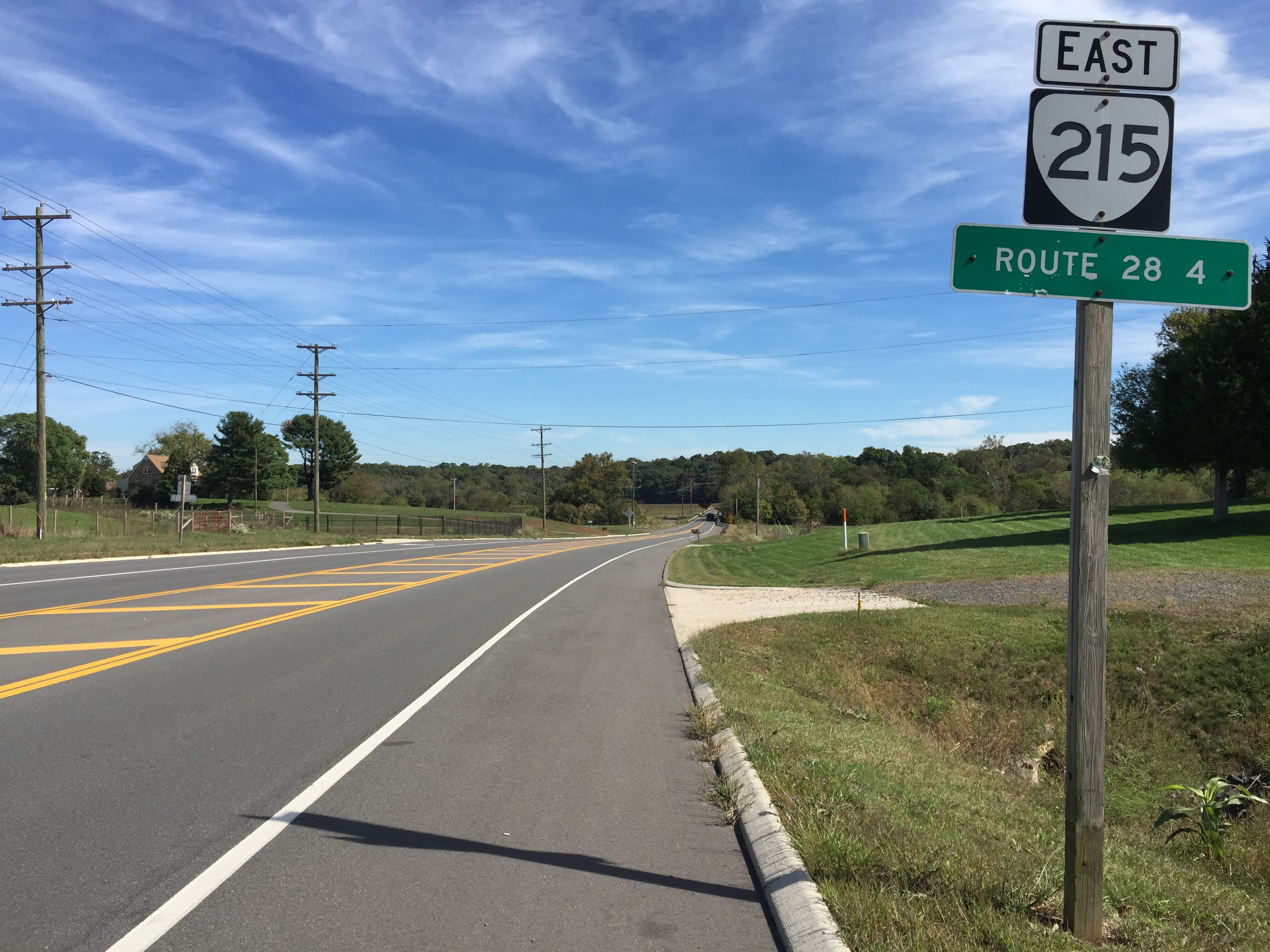
View east along SR 215 near Greenwich in Prince William County

SR 215 begins at an intersection with US 15 and US 29 (Lee Highway) at Buckland just west of the Fauquier – Prince William county line. The state highway heads southeast parallel to the county line, then passes to the north of the Vint Hill Village community as it curves east and enters Prince William County. SR 215 passes through the hamlet of Greenwich and passes to the south of the suburban community of Linton Hall. The state highway reaches its eastern terminus at SR 28 (Nokesville Road) near Bristow.

== Major intersections ==
| County | Location | mi | km | Destinations | Notes |
|---|---|---|---|---|---|
| Fauquier | Buckland | 0.00 | 0.00 | US 15 / US 29 (Lee Highway) – Warrenton | Western terminus |
| Prince William | Bristow | 9.26 | 14.90 | SR 28 (Nokesville Road) | Eastern terminus |
1.000 mi = 1.609 km; 1.000 km = 0.621 mi
