= Signal Hill (Prince William County, Virginia) =

- U.S. National Register of Historic Places
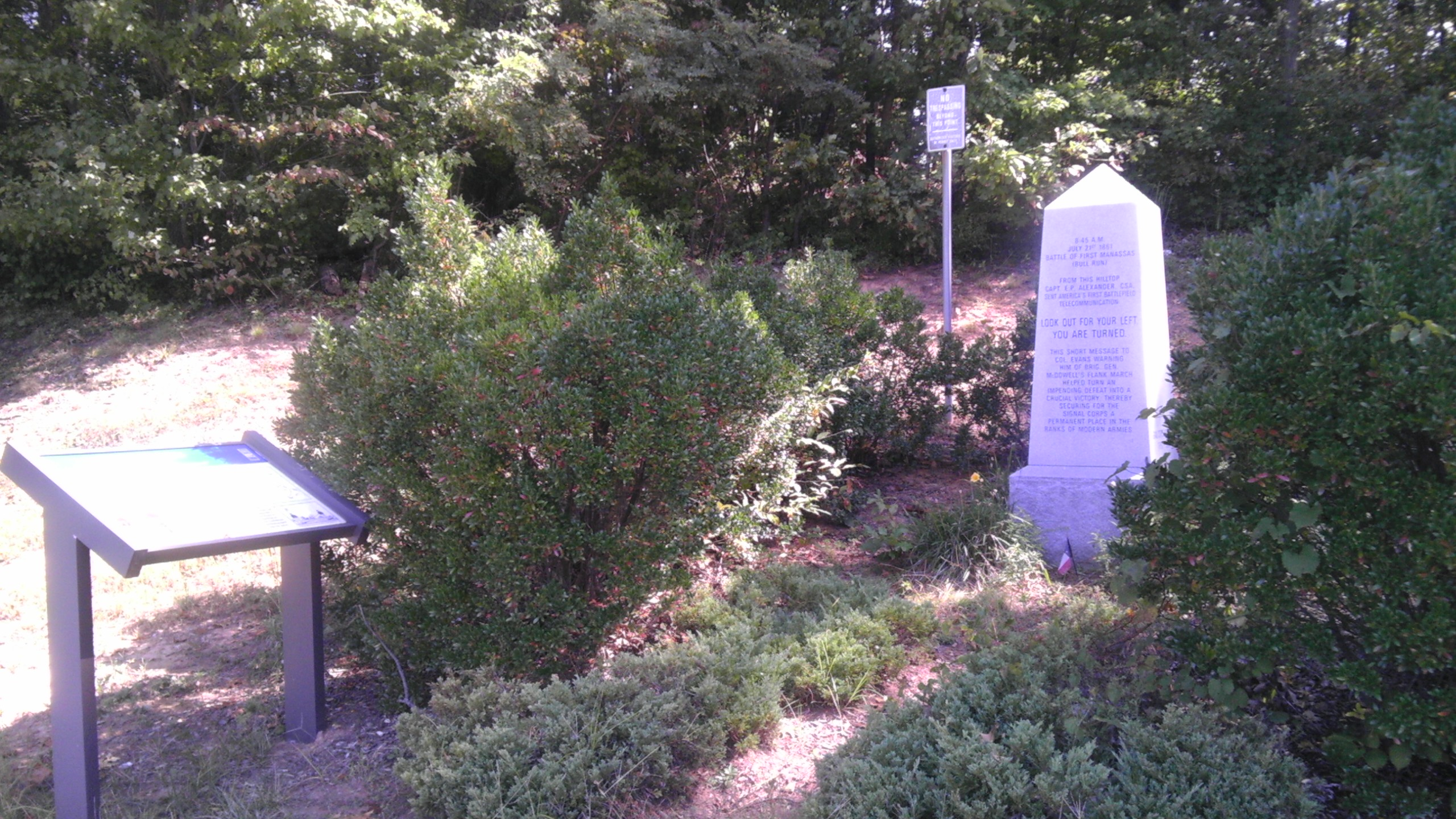

- Location within Northern Virginia Location within Virginia Location within the United States
- Location: 9301 Signal View Road, Prince William County, Virginia
- Nearest city: Manassas, Virginia
- Coordinates: 38°45′5″N 77°26′19″W
- Area: 5.9 acres (2.4 ha)
- Built: 1861
- MPS: Civil War Properties in Prince William County MPS
- NRHP reference No.: 89001062
- Added to NRHP: August 8, 1989

Signal Hill is a historic Confederate Army military site in Prince William County, Virginia. From this location, a signal station atop the hill, Confederate observers in 1861 spotted Union Army troops attempting to cross Sudley Ford. The Confederate response to this maneuver initiated the First Battle of Bull Run.

Part of Signal Hill is now part of a public park owned by the city of Manassas Park; the rest is part of a preservation area belonging to a neighborhood association. The site was listed on the National Register of Historic Places in 1989.

== See also ==
- National Register of Historic Places listings in Prince William County, Virginia
