= Nokesville, Virginia =

- Census-designated place (CDP)
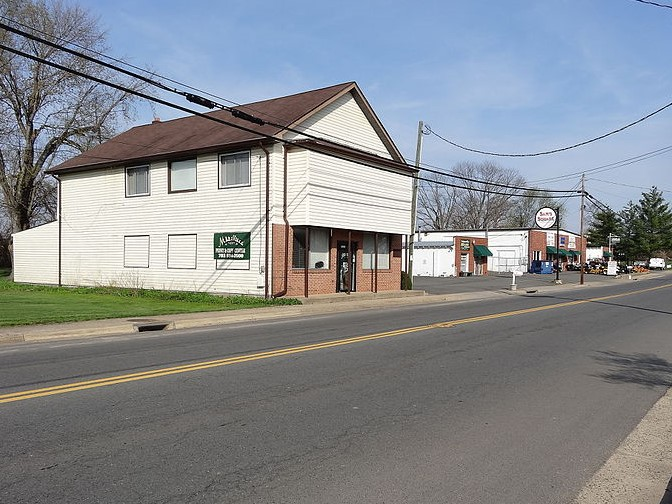
- Nickname: " Old Prince William"
- Location in Prince William County and the state of Virginia.
- Coordinates: 38°41′54″N 77°34′25″W
- Country: United States
- State: Virginia
- County: Prince William; Fauquier
- Named for: Norvel Nokes

Area
  - Total: 9.5 sq mi (24.5 km^{2})
  - Land: 9.5 sq mi (24.5 km^{2})
  - Water: 0 sq mi (0.0 km^{2})
- Elevation: 266 ft (81 m)

Population (2020)
  - Total: 1,619
  - Density: 171/sq mi (66.1/km^{2})
- Time zone: UTC−5 (Eastern (EST))
  - Summer (DST): UTC−4 (EDT)
- ZIP codes: 20181-20182
- Area codes: 571, 703
- FIPS code: 51-56464
- GNIS feature ID: 1497047
- Website: https://visitnokesville.com

Nokesville is a census-designated place (CDP) in Prince William and Fauquier counties, Virginia, United States. The population was 1,619 as of the 2020 census. The community is named for U.S. Marine Corps officer Norvel Nokes.

== History ==
Nokesville was the center of a farming community with cattle and dairy farms; it became a town and intermediate stop on the Orange & Alexandria Railway in 1865. In the late 19th century–early 20th century, Nokesville was the location of a religious movement called the German Baptist Brethren, which became known as the Church of the Brethren. In the 1950s, it was cut off from passenger trains and was a rural community today.

=== American Civil War ===
Union and Confederate forces passed by or camped in the Nokesville area frequently during the war. Federal units pursuing Stonewall Jackson to Manassas Junction camped here in August 1862; fighting involving John S. Mosby’s rangers flared near here and Confederates marched past on the way to nearby Bristoe Station in October 1863.

As Stonewall Jackson's troops occupied and looted the railroad junction at Manassas August 27, 1862, Federal forces approached his rear guard at Kettle Run. The Confederates there managed to delay the Union force before withdrawing.

== Geography ==
Nokesville is located at 38°41′54″N 77°34′25″W (38.698350, −77.573656). According to the United States Census Bureau, the CDP has a total area of 9.5 square miles (25 km^{2}), all land. Its ZIP code is 20181.

== Demographics ==
Historical population
Census	Pop.	Note	%±
2000	1,179		—
2010	1,354		14.8%
2020	1,619		19.6%
U.S. Decennial Census; 2000 2010 2020

Nokesville was first listed as a census designated place in the 2000 U.S. census.

=== 2020 census ===
As of the 2020 census, Nokesville had a population of 1,619. The median age was 43.0 years. 24.6% of residents were under the age of 18 and 17.5% were age 65 or older. For every 100 females there were 110.8 males, and for every 100 females age 18 and over there were 108.0 males age 18 and over.

0.0% of residents lived in urban areas, while 100.0% lived in rural areas.

There were 553 households, of which 32.7% had children under the age of 18 living in them. Of all households, 67.8% were married-couple households, 13.2% were households with a male householder and no spouse or partner present, and 15.4% were households with a female householder and no spouse or partner present. About 16.8% of all households were made up of individuals, and 5.4% had someone living alone who was 65 years of age or older.

There were 570 housing units, of which 3.0% were vacant. The homeowner vacancy rate was 1.5% and the rental vacancy rate was 2.4%.

Racial composition as of the 2020 census
Race	Number	Percent
White	1,284	79.3%
Black or African American	38	2.3%
American Indian and Alaska Native	7	0.4%
Asian	48	3.0%
Native Hawaiian and Other Pacific Islander	0	0.0%
Some other race	60	3.7%
Two or more races	182	11.2%
Hispanic or Latino (of any race)	202	12.5%

=== Income and poverty ===
The median income for a household was $83,920, and the median income for a family was $164,972. Males had a median income of $41,875 versus $27,188 for females. The per capita income for the CDP was $53,111, and 12.4% of residents lived in poverty.

== Education ==
Nokesville is served by four schools in Prince William County. The oldest school, Nokesville Elementary was built in 1929 to serve all grades until 1964 when it was lowered to K-5 with the construction of Brentsville District High School. In 2014, Nokesville Elementary moved to a new building that was built next to Brentsville District High School on Aden Road. This new school is called The Nokesville School and serves a K-8 community. The old school was sold and is now a Montessori school. Patriot High School is located on Kettle Run Road, and was opened in 2011. Built concurrently, next door is T. Clay Wood Elementary School. The Nokesville postal delivery area consists of two schools in Fauquier. Kettle Run High School and Greenville Elementary are both new schools built on the Fauquier County side of Nokesville.

Marstellar Middle School is located nearby in Bristow, and middle school students formerly attended this middle school prior to the K–8 school opening.

== Historic sites ==
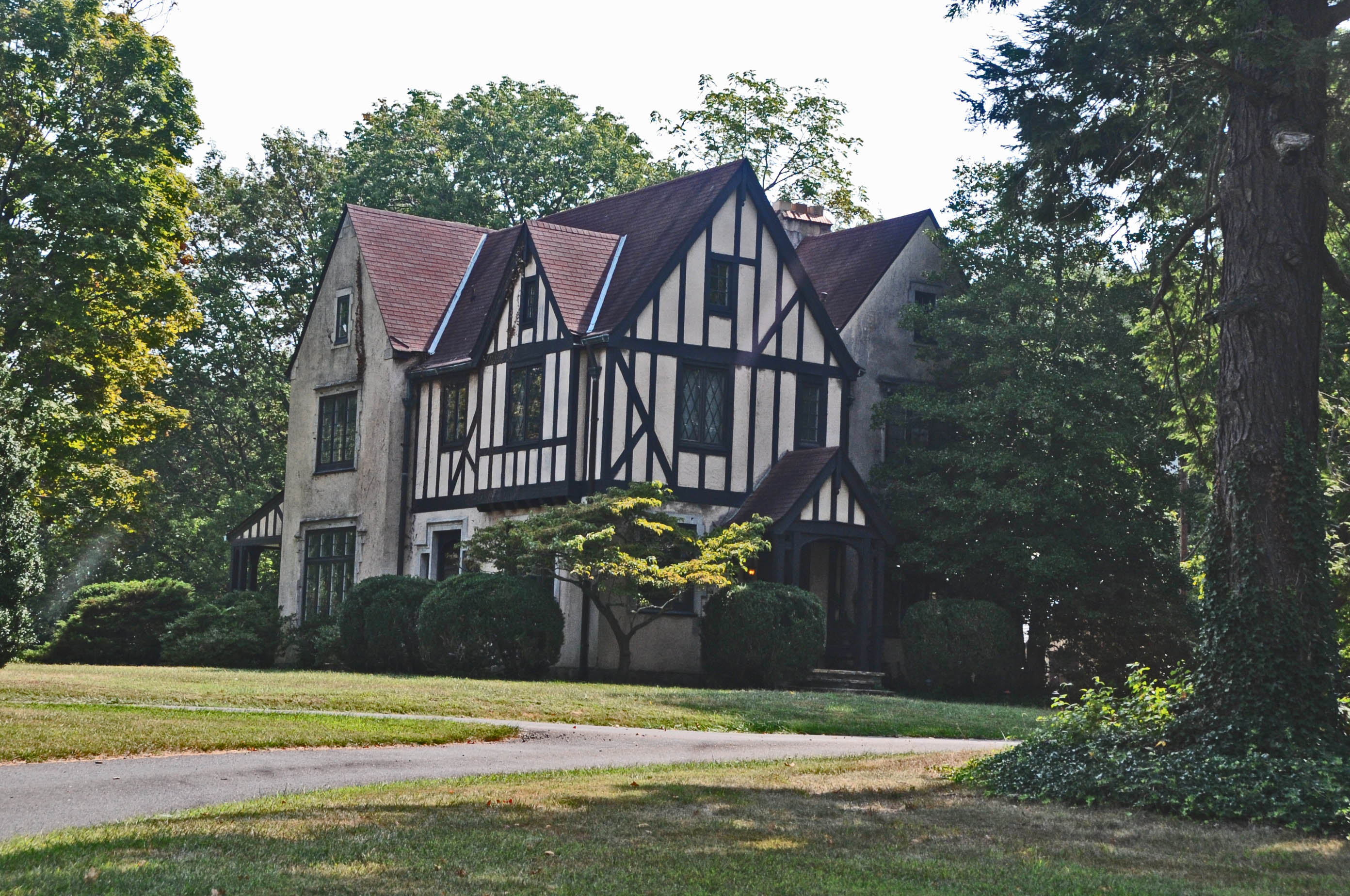
The Lawn

The Lawn, Nokesville Truss Bridge, Brentsville Historic District, Park Gate, and Pilgrim's Rest are listed on the National Register of Historic Places.
