= Mitchell's Ford Entrenchments =

- U.S. National Register of Historic Places
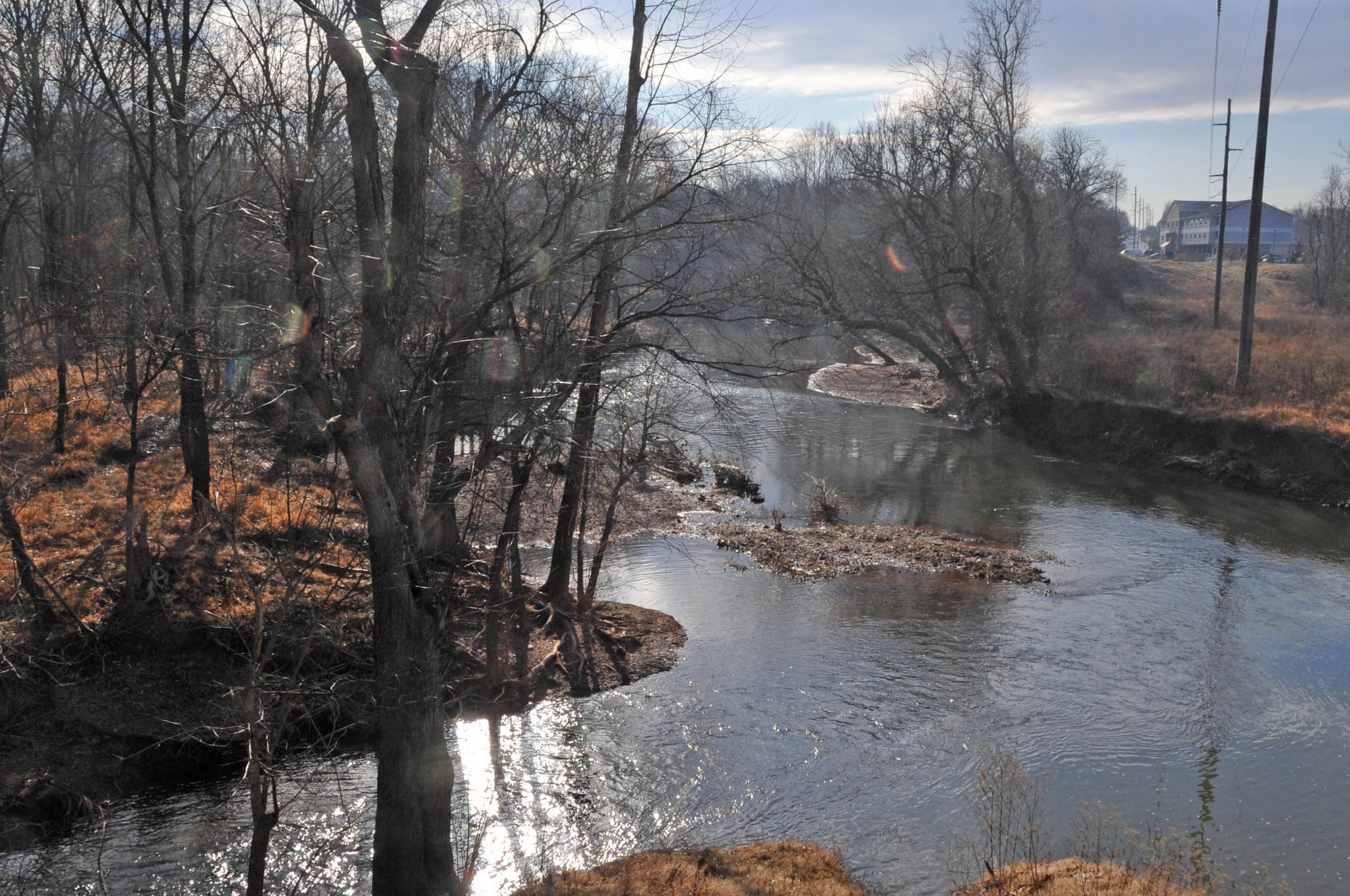
- Location: Off Old Centreville Road near Bull Run, near Manassas Park, Virginia
- Area: 5 acres (2.0 ha)
- Built: 1861
- Built by: Williamson, Col. T.H.; Harris, Capt. D.B.
- MPS: Civil War Properties in Prince William County MPS
- NRHP reference No.: 89001064
- Added to NRHP: August 8, 1989

The Mitchell's Ford Entrenchments are the remains of a Confederate Army defensive earthworks in Prince William County, Virginia. They are located off Old Centreville Road, overlooking what was historically called Mitchell's Ford, roughly where Old Centreville Road crosses Bull Run. These earthworks were occupied by Confederate troops defending the ford during the 1861 battles of Blackburn's Ford and First Bull Run. The area is now a local park managed by the local homeowner's association.

The site was listed on the National Register of Historic Places in 1989.

== See also ==
- National Register of Historic Places listings in Prince William County, Virginia
