= Orange and Alexandria Railroad Bridge Piers =

- U.S. National Register of Historic Places
- Location within Northern Virginia Location within Virginia Location within the United States
- Nearest city: Manassas Park, Virginia
- Coordinates: 38.776436°N 77.421606°W
- Area: less than one acre
- Built: 1861
- MPS: Civil War Properties in Prince William County MPS
- NRHP reference No.: 89001061
- Added to NRHP: August 8, 1989

The Orange and Alexandria Railroad Bridge Piers are the historical remains of a bridge that carried the Orange and Alexandria Railroad across Bull Run between Fairfax and Prince William Counties, Virginia. The railroad, and this bridge location in particular, were of strategic interest to both Union and Confederate forces during the American Civil War. The bridge was rebuilt at least seven times during the war years. The piers are located just south of a modern railroad bridge.

The piers were listed on the National Register of Historic Places in 1989.

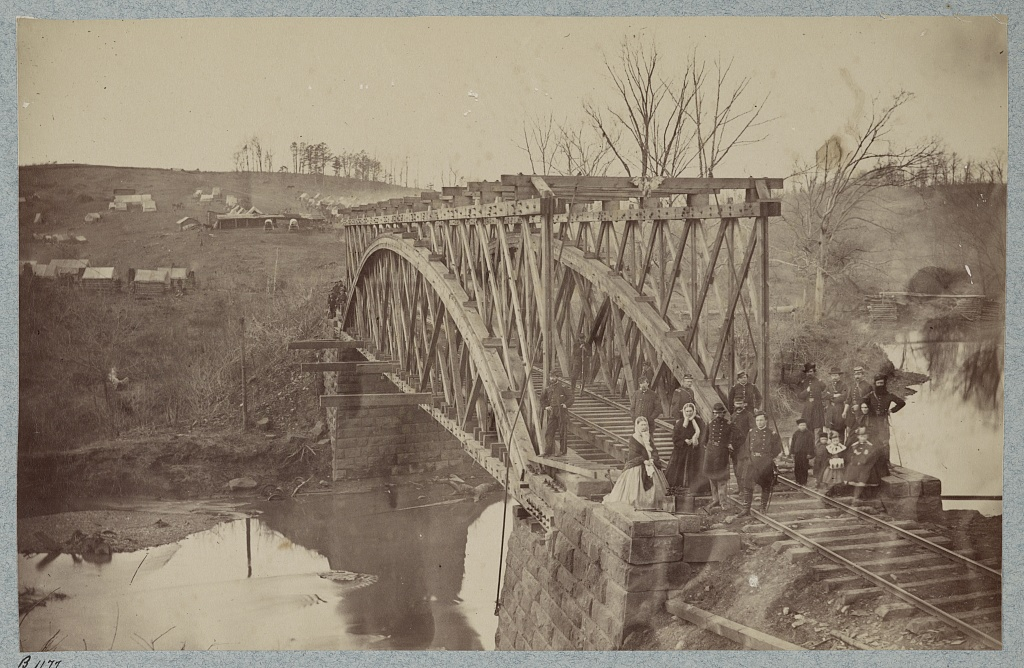
The Union Army/Orange & Alexandria Railroad Truss Bridge across Bull Run

== See also ==
- List of bridges on the National Register of Historic Places in Virginia
- National Register of Historic Places listings in Manassas, in Manassas Park, and in Prince William County, Virginia
- National Register of Historic Places listings in Fairfax County, Virginia
