= Tennessee Camp =

Archaeological site in Virginia, United States

- U.S. National Register of Historic Places
- Virginia Landmarks Register
- Nearest city: Marine Corps Base, Quantico, Virginia
- Area: 25.8 acres (10.4 ha)
- Built: 1861
- MPS: Campaigns for the Control of Navigation on the Lower Potomac River, 1861-1862, Virginia, Maryland, and DC, MPS
- NRHP reference No.: 08001059
- VLR No.: 089-5207

Significant dates
- Added to NRHP: November 12, 2008
- Designated VLR: June 19, 2008

Tennessee Camp, also known as 2nd Tennessee Volunteer Camp and Camp Bate, is a historic archaeological site and American Civil War encampment located at Marine Corps Base Quantico, Stafford County, Virginia. It was the location of a winter Confederate States Army regimental-sized camp from September 1861 through February 1862. It consists of at least 141 hut pits, surface features remaining from 'dugout' huts utilized as winter quarters by soldiers during the Civil War era.

It was listed on the National Register of Historic Places in 2008.
