= Norvel Nokes =

American Civil War Captain

Norvel Lane Nokes
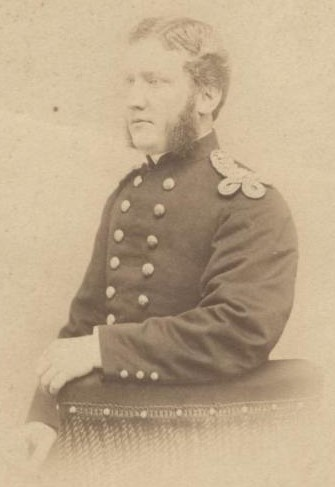
- Nokes c. 1870s
- Born: April 3, 1841; Washington, D.C., U.S.
- Died: October 7, 1883 (aged 42) USS Hartford; Corinto, Nicaragua
- Buried: Corinto, Nicaragua
- Allegiance: United States
- Branch: United States Marine Corps
- Service years: 1861–1883
- Rank: Captain
- Commands: North Atlantic Station; Pacific Station
- Known for: Sea captain, naval officer
- Conflicts: American Civil War
- Spouse: Cornelia Livingston Rodgers
- Children: 1

Norvel Lane Nokes (April 3, 1841 – October 7, 1883), sometimes spelled Norval Nokes, was a United States Marine Corps officer, commanding officer of the Marine Barracks in Washington, D.C., and the namesake of Nokesville, Virginia.

== Early life ==
Norvel Lane Nokes was born on April 3, 1841, in Washington, D.C. He was married to Cornelia Livingston Rodgers, a California native and the granddaughter of Secretary of the Navy John Rodgers. They had one daughter. In 1859, Nokes purchased one of the first parcels of land in the area now known as Nokesville. His half brothers, James and George Nokes, both purchased plots of land in the area during the same period.

== Military career ==
From the American Civil War until 1872, Nokes served in a variety of Naval posts.

=== Civil War ===
During the Civil War, he served aboard the USS Vincennes (November 1861 to June 1863) and USS Pensacola. In December 1863, Vincennes successfully captured two Confederate supply ships. In 1863, President Abraham Lincoln nominated and commissioned Nokes as a first lieutenant. In the 1860s, Nokes corresponded with Commandant of the Marine Corps John Harris. In 1864, Nokes was a member of a Board of Survey along with Major Charles G. McCawley and Major George R. Graham.

=== Post-Civil War ===
After the Civil War, Nokes served on the USS Ossipee and later at Norfolk Naval Shipyard. He was commissioned as a captain in 1872, and served as Fleet Marine Officer for the North Atlantic Station from 1872 to 1875.

From 1875 to 1878, he was the commanding officer of the Marine Barracks in Washington, D.C. He later served in Mare Island and his last post was as Fleet Marine Officer for the Pacific Station.

== Death ==
Nokes died on October 7, 1883, in Corinto, Nicaragua, aboard the USS Hartford. Nokes was buried ashore in Corinto, and one of the servicemen aiding in the burial was Joseph Henry Pendleton, future Marine Corps general.

== Legacy ==
- John Philip Sousa dedicated his 1879 Resumption March to Nokes
- Nokes is the namesake of Nokesville, Virginia
