= Marine Corps Brig, Quantico =

Former military prison

Coordinates: 38°29′24″N 77°18′58″W

Marine Corps Brig, Quantico was a Level I facility military prison operated at Marine Corps Base Quantico in Quantico, Virginia, from 1972 until December 31, 2011. The building was located in eastern Stafford County, south of the base headquarters.

By definition, Level I means that it "provide[d] pretrial and short-term posttrial confinement support. Level I confinement facilities are generally limited to 90 or fewer days. When necessary, Level I facilities may confine prisoners more than 90 days, but not to exceed 1 year." Unlike Regional corrections facilities, counseling support for military prisoners is limited.

In practice, the facility could house approximately 120–150 inmates in living arrangements ranging from squadbays (for the general population) to Special Quarters 2, which is effectively solitary confinement. The facility was used primarily as a place to temporarily harbor inmates awaiting transfer to longer term facilities, such as the United States Disciplinary Barracks at Fort Leavenworth, Kansas.

Security included a single chain-link fence about 20 feet high with razor wire, cameras, and guards. Guards were divided into three sections, composed of United States Navy and United States Marine Corps personnel in ranks from E-1 to E-6/7. In addition to security personnel, the Brig had a small administration staff including medical personnel and civilian cooks who worked with inmates to prepare meals. The Brig also offered a small library and chapel for weekly services.

The Pretrial Confinement Facility at MCB Quantico was permanently closed on December 31, 2011, as part of cost-cutting measures recommended by the 2005 Base Realignment and Closure Commission. Prisoners awaiting trial will be held instead at a regional military correctional facility in Chesapeake, Virginia. The building was demolished by May 2013 at a cost of $590,264.

== Notable prisoners ==
Over the years, there were some prominent inmates at the Brig, including John Hinckley Jr., a would-be presidential assassin, Clayton J. Lonetree, the Marine Security Guard who provided classified information to the KGB while stationed at the U.S. Embassy, Moscow from 1984 to 1986, and Rayful Edmond, largely credited with introducing crack cocaine into the Washington, D.C., area.

After Chelsea Manning (convicted in 2013 of leaking classified information to WikiLeaks, including the 250,000 diplomatic cables, video of the July 12, 2007, Baghdad airstrike, and footage of the Granai airstrike) was transferred to Quantico in July 2010, numerous allegations of abuse arose, including isolation, the use of maximum-security custody and suicide watch for punitive reasons, and other non-violent harassment by the guards, such as forced nudity. Though military officials denied abuse (including an incident where State Department spokesman Philip J. Crowley was forced to resign), the hacker group Anonymous threatened to disrupt activities at Quantico by cyber-attacking communications, exposing private information about personnel, and other harassment. Dubbed "Operation Bradical", spokesperson Barrett Brown stated that this would be in direct response for the alleged mistreatment. Military spokespersons responded that the threat was referred to law enforcement and counter-terrorism officials for investigation.

== See also ==
- List of U.S. military prisons
