= Moor Green =

Historic house in Virginia, United States

- U.S. National Register of Historic Places
- Virginia Landmarks Register
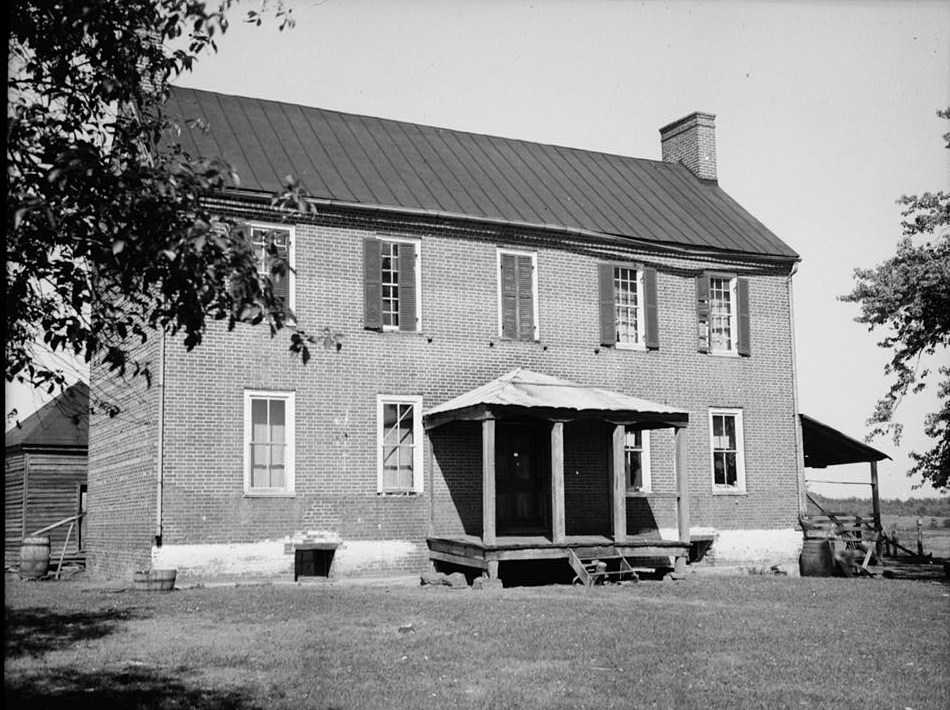
- Moor Green, HABS Photo

- Location within Northern Virginia Location within Virginia Location within the United States
- Location: 9850 Flint Rock Road, approximately 1.3 miles (2.1 km) north of Brentsville off State Route 692, near Brentsville, Virginia
- Coordinates: 38°42′26″N 77°29′49″W
- Area: 12 acres (4.9 ha)
- Architectural style: Federal
- NRHP reference No.: 78003039
- VLR No.: 076-0014

Significant dates
- Added to NRHP: November 17, 1978
- Designated VLR: July 18, 1978

Moor Green is a historic home located near Brentsville, Prince William County, Virginia. It dates to the early-19th century, and is a two-story, five-bay, Federal style brick residence, with a one-room, two-story ell. It has a standing seam metal gable roof and a single-pile, central-passage plan.

== History ==
Although some speculated that the house's foundation dates to a blockhouse built in 1711, the earliest reference to what became that plantation was a 1793 deed for 482 acres from the heirs of John Bronough to young Howson Hooe. The plantation was one of the most valuable properties in Prince William County in 1815, when it was taxed to pay for the War of 1812.

Members of the Hooe family owned the property until 1909, when the surviving (second) husband of Jane Hooe (Howson's daughter) sold his life interest in what had become 375 acres. Howson's grandson Richard I Reid, enlisted in the Confederate Army, was wounded at Fredericksburg in December 1862, and later captured at Mechanicsville in May 1864. Released upon signing an oath of Allegiance to the United States in June 1865, he married moved to Fulton County, Kentucky, but both he and his younger brother John died at this plantation in 1885, and their mother in 1893. The Fletcher family then owned the house through the Great Depression, during which it was noted on the Historic American Buildings Survey. In 1941, John Cox and his family bought the property, and renovated it, as noted in a 1953 article in the local 'Journal Messenger.'

After his widow died in a nursing home in 1970, the property passed through several hands and was vacant for 19 years as the area developed. In 1978, the historic house was placed on both the Virginia Landmarks Register and the National Register of Historic Places.

The house was burned on March 4, 1984, but a local bank renovated it, and in 1992 it was bought by the Flory family, who made it their residence.

The property includes the Hooe/Reid family cemetery, which according to a Smithsonian Institution historic survey in 2004, might include up to 60 graves, especially if the home became a hospital during the American Civil War. A nearby slave cemetery was no longer part of the property by 2004, as a result of subdivisions and development.

The back of the surviving house and outbuildings are visible from Moor Green Road, which has more recently built houses.
