= Buckland Historic District =

Historic district in Virginia, United States

- U.S. National Register of Historic Places
- U.S. Historic district
- Virginia Landmarks Register
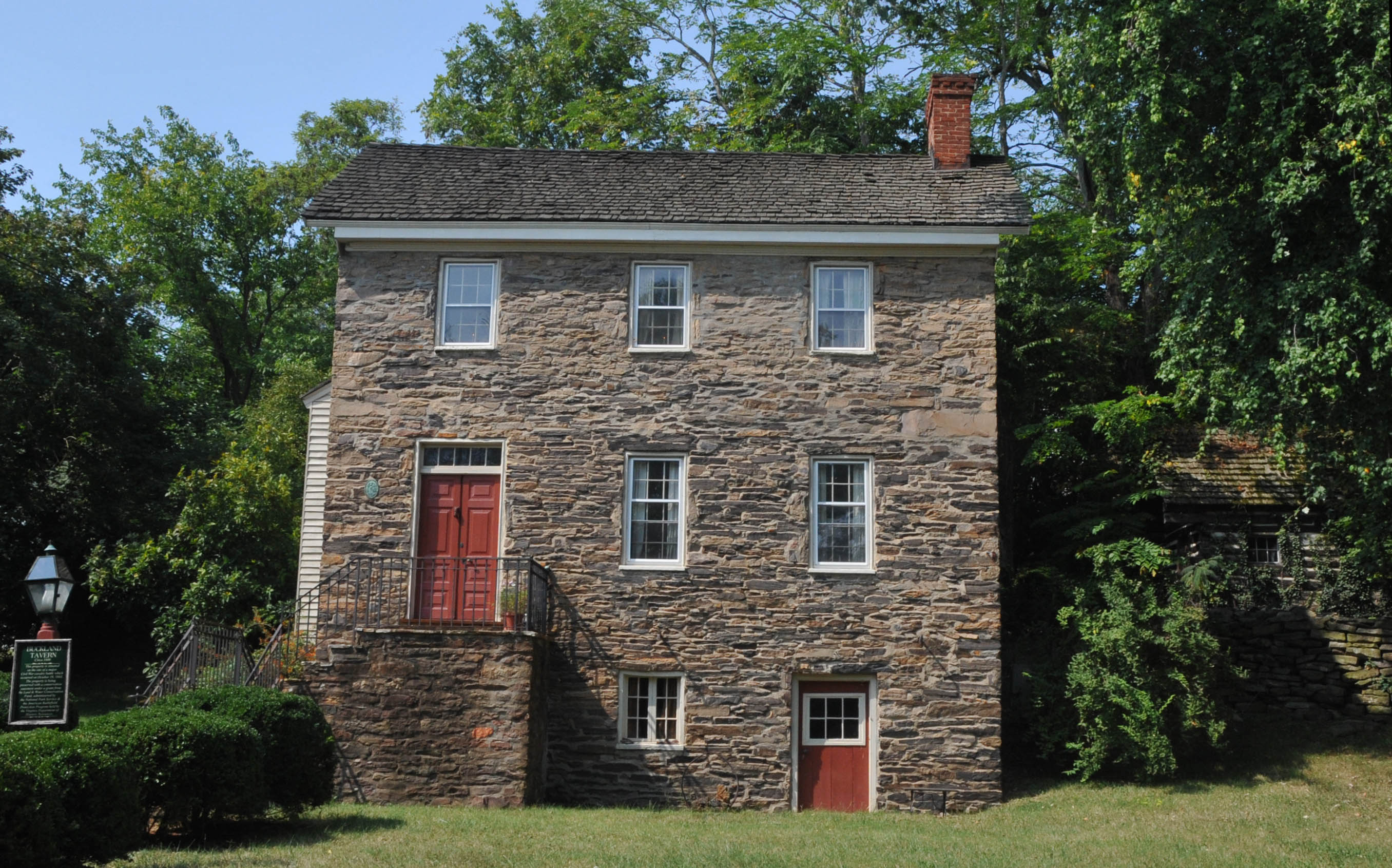
- Buckland Tavern in the Buckland Historic District, March 2007

- Location within Northern Virginia Location within Virginia Location within the United States
- Location: 7980-8205 Buckland Mill Rd. and 16206, 16208, 16210, and 16211 Lee Highway; also parts of Buckland Mill and Cerro Gordo Rds., and U.S. Routes 15/29, Buckland, Virginia
- Coordinates: 38°46′50″N 77°40′29″W
- Area: 429.6 acres (173.9 ha)
- Built: 1774
- Built by: Crozet, Claudius; Sanders, Leslie, et al.
- Architectural style: Federal, Late Federal, Early Republic, Mid 19th Century Revival, et al.
- NRHP reference No.: 88000681, 08000246 (Boundary Increase)
- VLR No.: 076-0313

Significant dates
- Added to NRHP: June 17, 1988, March 27, 2008 (Boundary Increase)
- Designated VLR: December 8, 1987, December 5, 2007

Buckland Historic District is a national historic district located at Buckland, Prince William County, Virginia. It encompasses 30 contributing buildings, 11 contributing sites, and 6 contributing structures in the town of Buckland. The district is centered on a grist mill (c. 1899), Buckland Mill, the third such structure located on the site. Besides the mill, the most significant buildings include an early 19th-century wagon tavern and a small church (c. 1857). For the most part the houses are small, simple, 19th-century dwellings constructed of log, frame or stone; most were intended to serve a commercial as well as a residential purpose. Other contributing resources include the mill race and dam, Cerro Gordo plantation, portions of the Civil War Buckland battlefields, the Kinsley Mill and miller's house, and Buckland Hall (c. 1774).

It was added to the National Register of Historic Places in 1988, with a boundary increase in 2008.
