= Brentsville Historic District =

Historic district in Virginia, United States

- U.S. National Register of Historic Places
- U.S. Historic district
- Virginia Landmarks Register
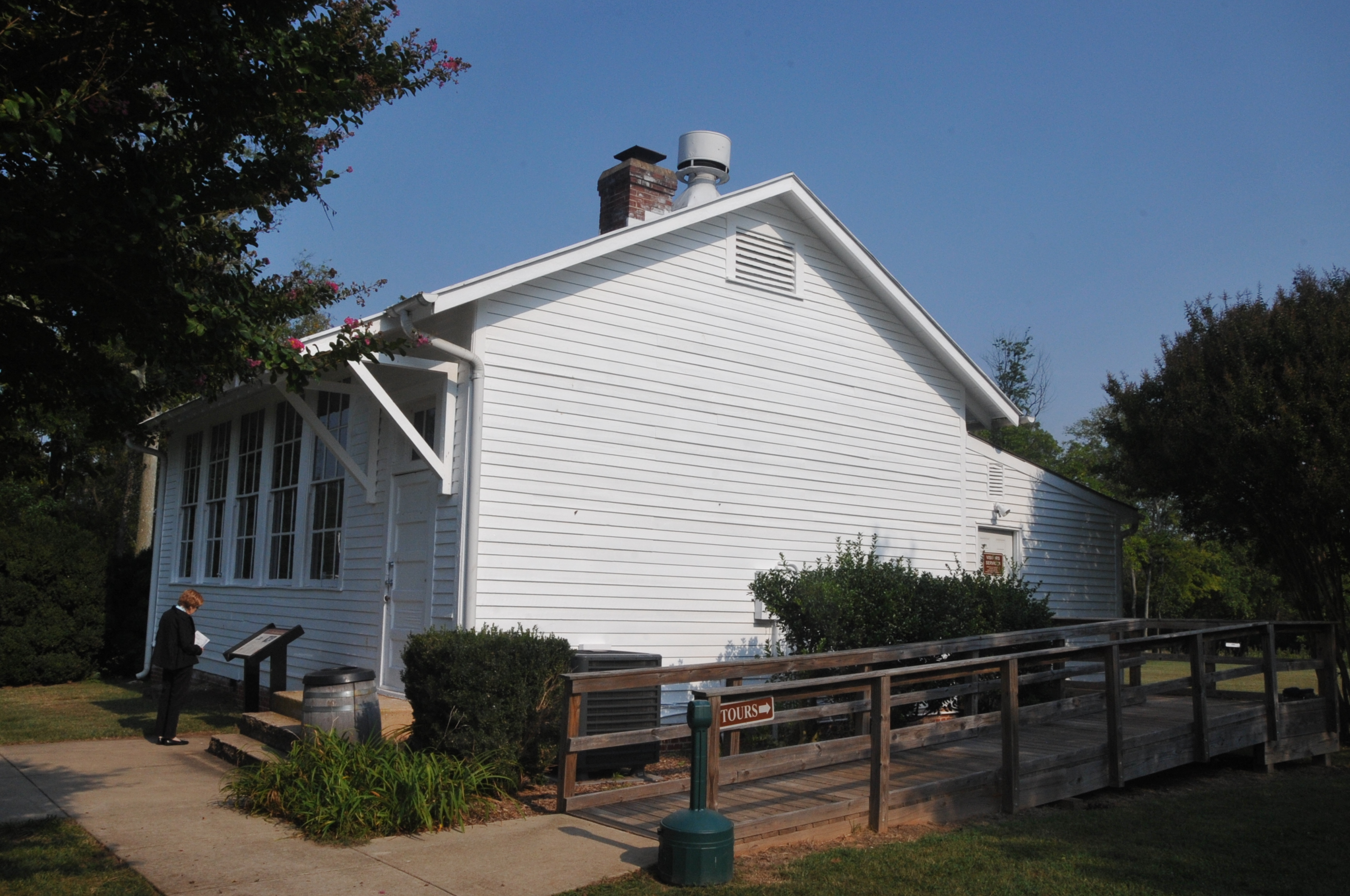
- One-room school in the Brentsville Historic District, March 2007

- Location within Northern Virginia Location within Virginia Location within the United States
- Location: Roughly Bristow Rd. from Old Church Rd. to Isaac Walton Rd., near Bristow, Virginia
- Coordinates: 38°41′21″N 77°30′06″W
- Area: 27 acres (11 ha)
- Built: 1822
- Architectural style: Greek Revival, Federal, I-house
- MPS: Civil War Properties in Prince William County MPS
- NRHP reference No.: 90001829
- VLR No.: 076-0338

Significant dates
- Added to NRHP: December 21, 1990
- Designated VLR: February 20, 1990

Brentsville Historic District is a national historic district located near Bristow, at Brentsville, Prince William County, Virginia. It encompasses 23 contributing buildings and 2 contributing sites in the village of Brentsville platted in 1822. These include the former Brentsville Courthouse and Jail, a one-room school (1928), three churches, 11 houses, one ruins of a dwelling, a tavern square site, and 14 outbuildings.

It was added to the National Register of Historic Places in 1990.
