= Davis–Beard House =

Historic house in Virginia, United States

- U.S. National Register of Historic Places
- Virginia Landmarks Register
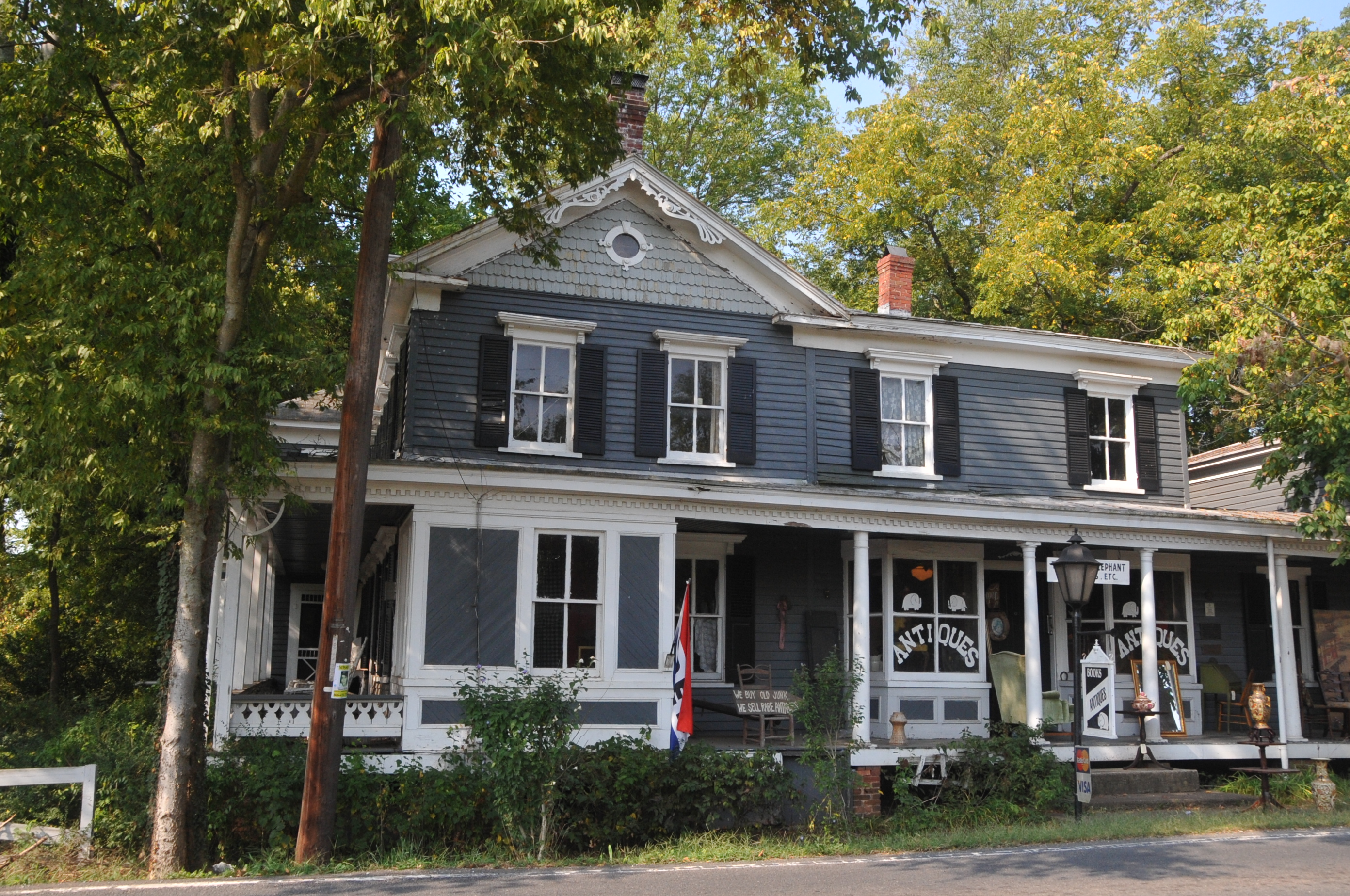
- Davis–Beard House, March 2007

- Location within Northern Virginia Location within Virginia Location within the United States
- Location: 10726 Bristow Rd., Bristow, Virginia
- Coordinates: 38°43′24″N 77°32′15″W
- Area: 0.5 acres (0.20 ha)
- Architectural style: Late Victorian, Folk Victorian I-house
- NRHP reference No.: 89001794
- VLR No.: 076-0245

Significant dates
- Added to NRHP: November 9, 1989
- Designated VLR: December 13, 1988

Davis–Beard House, also known as Glee Hall and Davis House, is a historic home located at Bristow, Prince William County, Virginia. It was built after the American Civil War, and is a two-story, five-bay, frame dwelling with later additions. The rambling dwelling has a number of Late Victorian style decorative elements. It features a one-story wraparound porch, decorated gables, bay windows, and storefront. Also on the property are a contributing brick hip-roofed carriage house and a small lattice-covered frame privy.

It was listed on the National Register of Historic Places in 1989.
