= Bristow, Virginia =

Bristow
- Unincorporated community
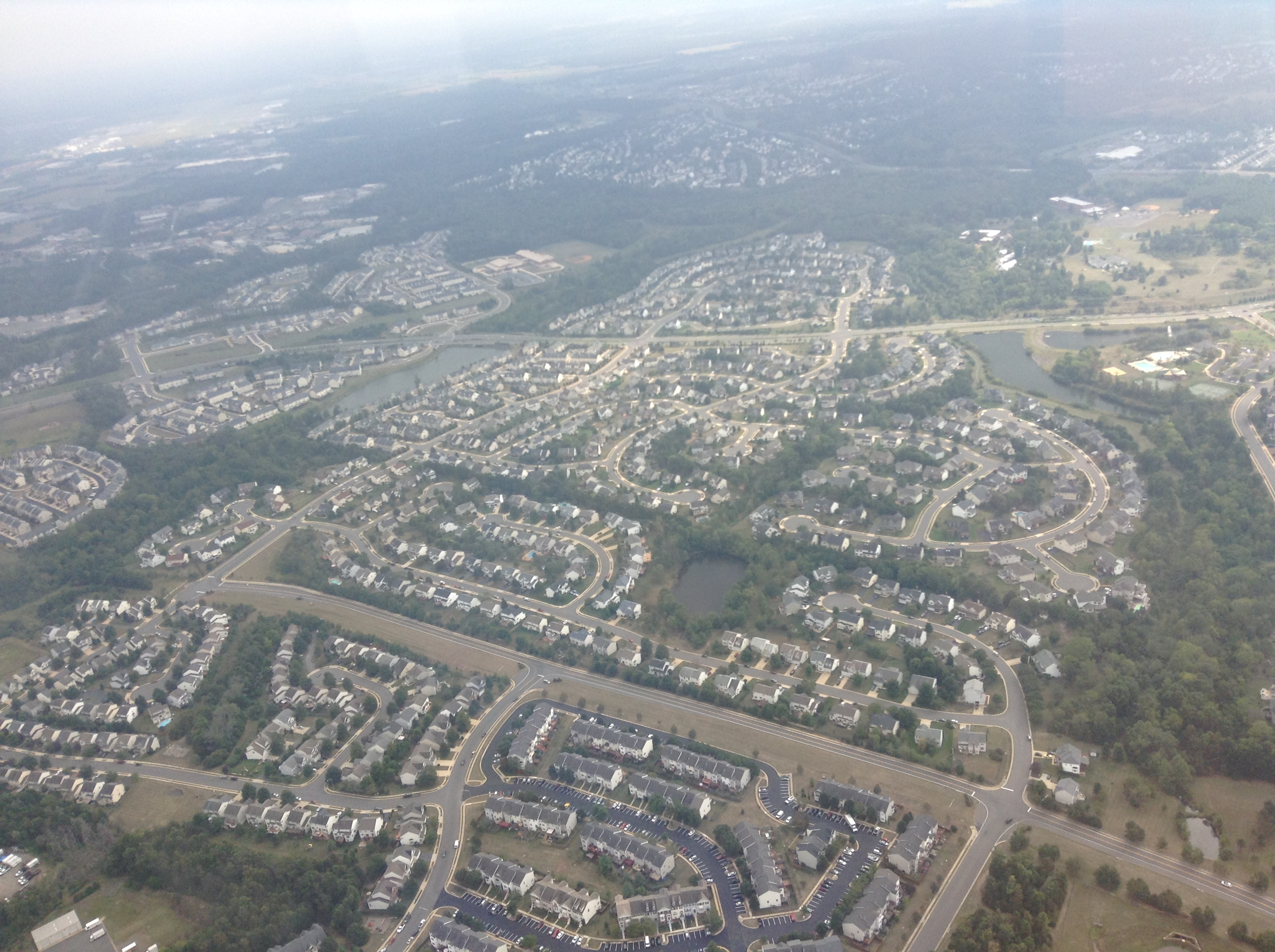
- Aerial view of Victory Lakes neighborhood of Bristow

- Location within the state of Virginia Bristow (Virginia) Bristow (the United States)
- Coordinates: 38°43′22″N 77°32′10″W
- Country: United States
- State: Virginia
- County: Prince William

Area
  - Total: 14.58 sq mi (37.8 km^{2})

Population (2014)
  - Total: 31,074
  - Density: 2,131/sq mi (822.9/km^{2})
- Demonym: Bristigian
- Time zone: UTC−5 (Eastern (EST))
  - Summer (DST): UTC−4 (EDT)
- ZIP codes: 20136
- Area codes: 703, 571

Bristow is an unincorporated community of Prince William County, Virginia, United States, located approximately 30 miles (48 km) from Washington, D.C. It is situated between Manassas and Gainesville. As of 2014, the total population was 29,346, a 287% increase since 2000. The Bristow community is formally included in the Linton Hall, Virginia census-designated place (CDP)

== History ==
The majority of the Bristow Area was previously part of the Linton's Ford plantation, owned by the Linton family from the 18th century. In 1894, Sarah Linton converted to Catholicism and became a Visitation nun, and she donated the property to the Roman Catholic Church, to be used to establish schools for poor girls and boys.

Linton Hall Military School was founded in 1922, for which the main road was named: Linton Hall Road. In 1989, the school ended its military and boarding programs and became coeducational; it had already been renamed Linton Hall School many years earlier. In the late 20th century, much of the original property was sold to developers.

== Geography ==
=== Climate ===
Climate data for Bristow
Month	Jan	Feb	Mar	Apr	May	Jun	Jul	Aug	Sep	Oct	Nov	Dec	Year
Mean daily maximum °F (°C)	43 (6)	47 (8)	56 (13)	67 (19)	75 (24)	84 (29)	89 (32)	87 (31)	80 (27)	68 (20)	58 (14)	47 (8)	67 (19)
Mean daily minimum °F (°C)	29 (−2)	31 (−1)	38 (3)	47 (8)	56 (13)	66 (19)	71 (22)	70 (21)	63 (17)	51 (11)	41 (5)	33 (1)	50 (10)
Average precipitation inches (mm)	2.81 (71)	2.71 (69)	3.48 (88)	3.06 (78)	3.99 (101)	3.78 (96)	3.73 (95)	2.93 (74)	3.72 (94)	3.4 (86)	3.17 (81)	3.05 (77)	39.83 (1,010)
Source: Weather.com

According to the Geographic Names Information System, Bristow has also been known as Briscoe, Bristoe, Bristoe Station, and Bristow Station. The Board on Geographic Names officially decided upon Bristow as the community's name in 1906.

The Brentsville Historic District and Davis-Beard House are listed on the National Register of Historic Places.

The former village proper was located on SR 619, Bristow Road, about 1 mile southwest of the intersection with SR 28, Nokesville Road, at the Norfolk Southern Railway crossing. There are a few businesses left at this location, and a crew change point for the railroad is just up the tracks from the railroad crossing. The new town center has, in general, relocated farther west around the Braemar Parkway area.

== Demographics ==
As of the 2020 census, there were 31,074 people and 9,126 housing units in the town. The racial makeup of the town was 59% White, 11% Black, 12% Asian, 0.28% Native American, 0.12% Pacific Islander, and 4% from other races. Hispanic people of any race were 14% of the population.

== Media ==
The Bristow Beat is an online publication covering local news.

== Infrastructure ==
=== Transportation ===
==== Mode of transport to work ====
According to the ACS 2021 data, 70% of the working population drove alone to work, 7% carpooled, 17% worked at home and 3% took public transport.

==== Highway ====
Major highways that connect Bristow include Virginia Route 28, Virginia Route 234 and Virginia Route 215.

==== Rail ====
Bristow is served by the Broad Run/Airport Virginia Railway Express station, which is in southern Bristow on the boarder with Manassas. The station offers weekday service to the inner suburbs of Fairfax County, Virginia, Alexandria, Arlington and Washington, D.C.

==== Air ====
The Manassas Regional Airport is located in the City of Manassas, adjacent to Bristow, and serves the area. The airport expects commercial flights to start in 2027.

== Notable people ==
- Humayun Khan, soldier who died in combat in 2004
- Lucky Whitehead, Dallas Cowboys wide receiver
- Greg Stroman, NFL defensive back who has played for three teams

== See also ==
- Battle of Bristoe Station
