= White House (Brentsville, Virginia) =

Historic house in Virginia, United States

- U.S. National Register of Historic Places
- Virginia Landmarks Register
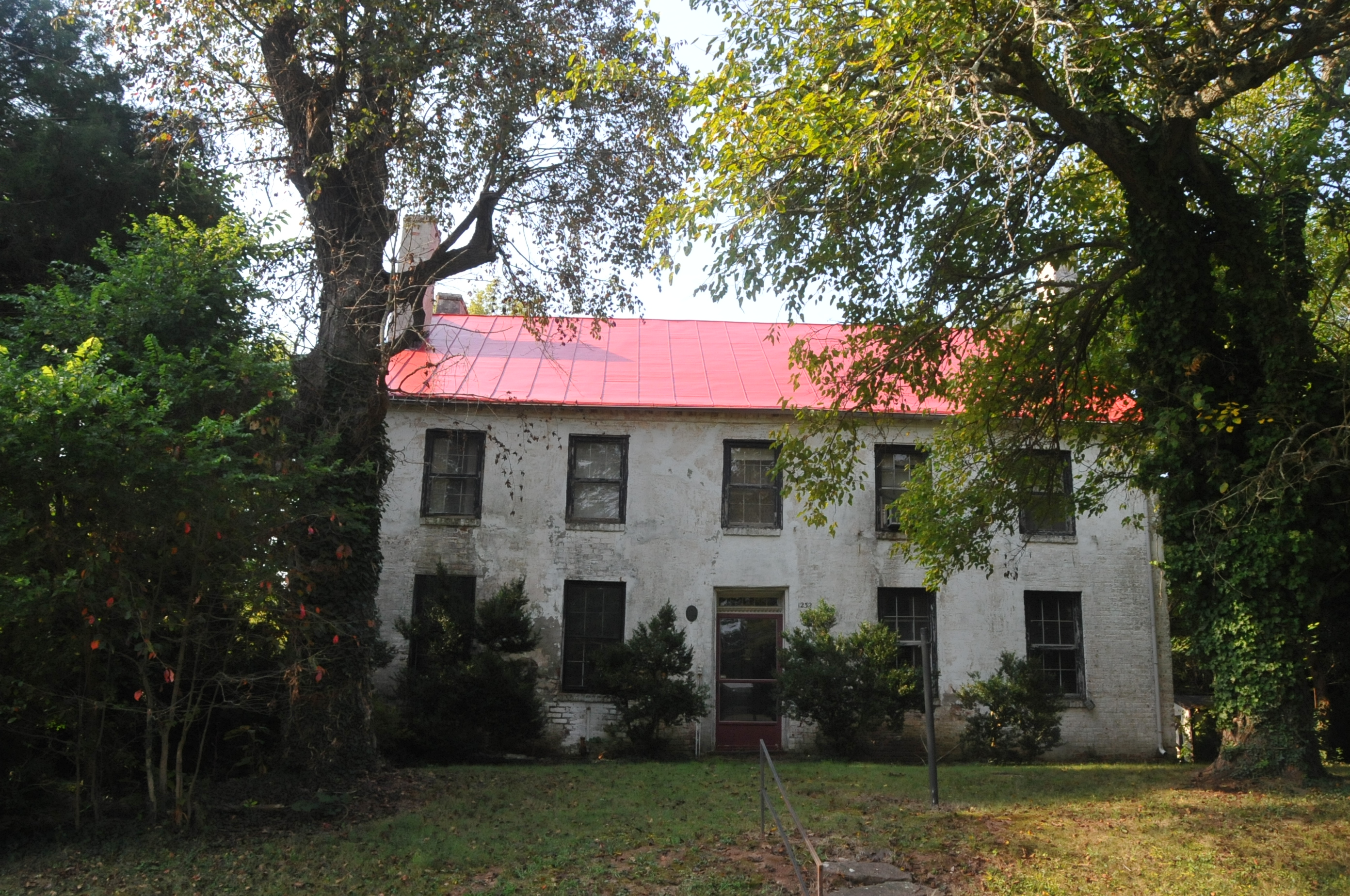
- White House, March 2007

- Location within Northern Virginia Location within Virginia Location within the United States
- Location: 12320 Bristow Rd., Brentsville, Virginia
- Coordinates: 38°41′19″N 77°29′59″W
- Area: 1.8 acres (0.73 ha)
- Built: 1822
- Architectural style: Federal
- NRHP reference No.: 89001795
- VLR No.: 076-0031

Significant dates
- Added to NRHP: October 30, 1989
- Designated VLR: December 13, 1988

The White House in Brentsville, Virginia was built in 1822. It was listed on the National Register of Historic Places in 1989. It is also known as the Williams-Dawe House.

It is significant as "the finest example of Federal, residential architecture in Brentsville, Virginia" and is probably the oldest surviving house in the village. It was first the home of a prominent widow, said to have been the first post-mistress in either Prince William County, or the State of Virginia, and is believed to have been a social gathering place. Lived in from 1941 through the 1990s by Agnes Webster and her family (rented to the John Curd family in 1959–1962)

The house is a two-story Federal style gabled brick building, with double chimneys at each end. The brickwork is Flemish bond on the front and 5 course American bond in the rear.

In April 2022 the house was purchased by Prince William County. Work began clearing the house in June 2022.
