= The Lawn (Nokesville, Virginia) =

Historic house in Virginia, United States

- U.S. National Register of Historic Places
- U.S. Historic district
- Virginia Landmarks Register
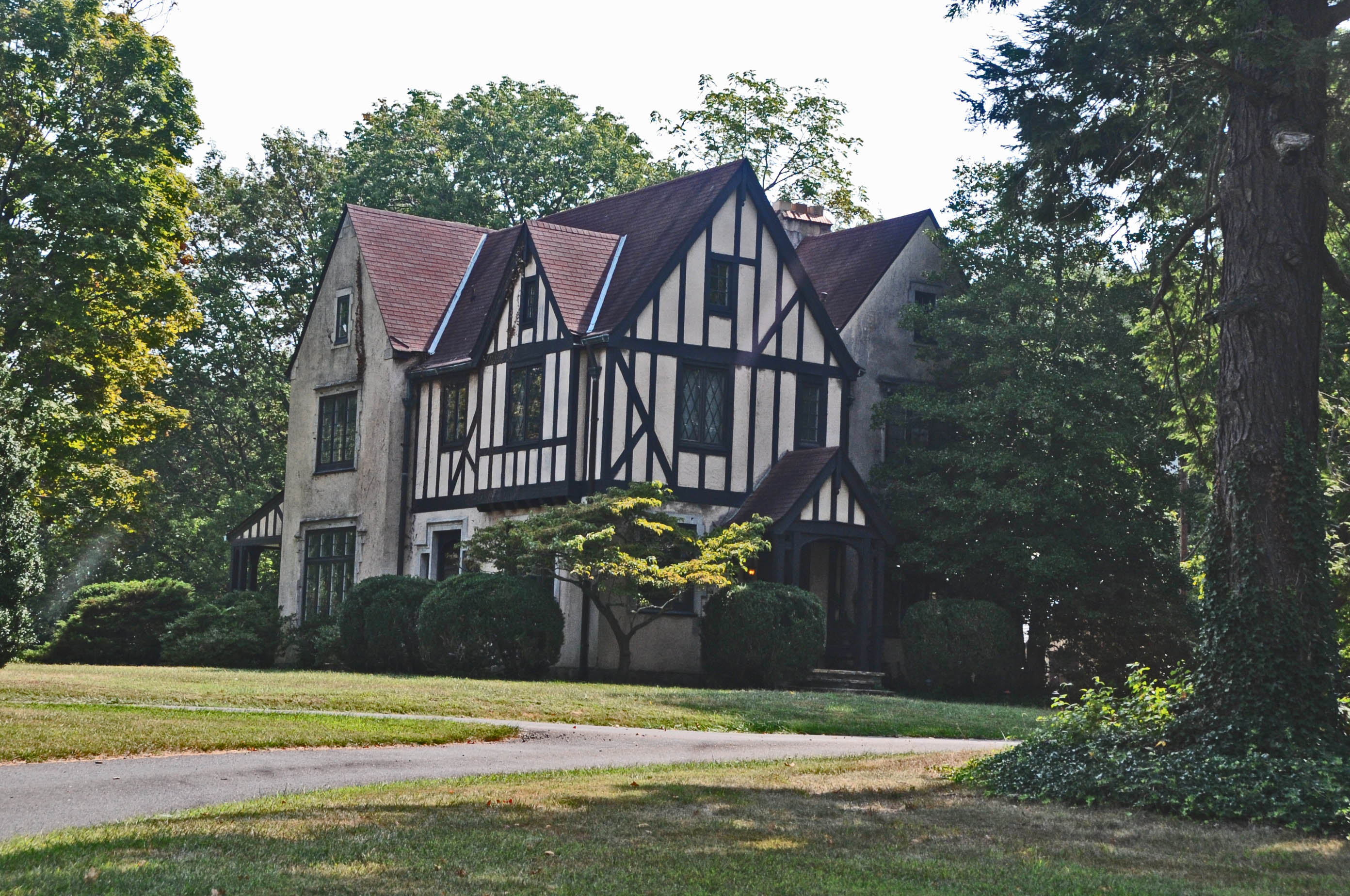
- The Lawn, March 2007

- Location within Northern Virginia Location within Virginia Location within the United States
- Location: 15027 Vint Hill Rd./State Route 215, near Nokesville, Virginia
- Coordinates: 38°44′59″N 77°38′44″W
- Area: 29 acres (12 ha)
- Built: c. 1850, 1926
- Built by: Mullett, A.B. & Co.
- Architectural style: Tudor Revival, Gothic Revival
- NRHP reference No.: 89001798
- VLR No.: 076-0178

Significant dates
- Added to NRHP: October 30, 1989
- Designated VLR: December 13, 1988

The Lawn is a historic home and national historic district located near Nokesville, Prince William County, Virginia. The main house was built in 1926 to replace the original Gothic Revival style dwelling that burned in a fire in 1921. It is a two-story, three-bay, Tudor Revival style, stuccoed dwelling. The house features half-timber framing and a complex cross gable roof. Attached to the house is a brick kitchen wing that survived from the original house. Also included in the district are a board-and-batten schoolhouse, barn, smokehouse, overseer's cottage, privy, stone dairy, and stone root cellar.

It was added to the National Register of Historic Places in 1989.
