= Effingham (Aden, Virginia) =

Historic house in Virginia, United States

- U.S. National Register of Historic Places
- U.S. Historic district
- Virginia Landmarks Register
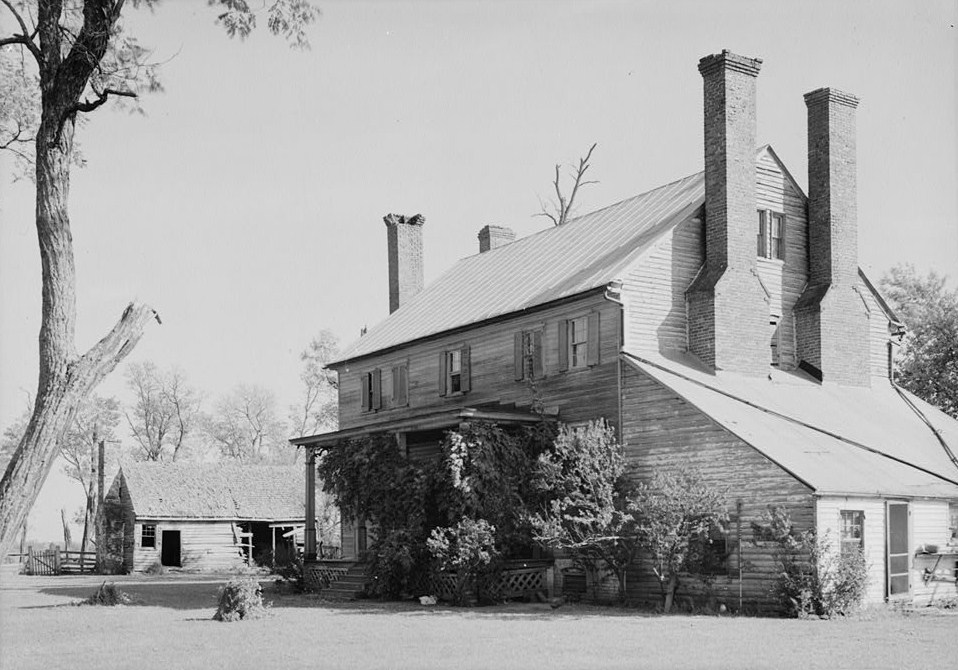
- Effingham, HABS Photo

- Location within Northern Virginia Location within Virginia Location within the United States
- Location: 14103 Aden Rd., Aden, Virginia
- Coordinates: 38°38′13″N 77°31′20″W
- Area: 330 acres (130 ha)
- Built: 1777
- Architectural style: Colonial, Southern Colonial
- NRHP reference No.: 89001793
- VLR No.: 076-0006

Significant dates
- Added to NRHP: November 9, 1989
- Designated VLR: December 13, 1988

Effingham is a historic home and national historic district located at Aden, Prince William County, Virginia. It was built about 1777, and is a large, two-story, five-bay, Tidewater-style, frame residence set on a raised basement. It features a massive, exterior, brick, double chimney joined by a pent closet at each end of the structure. Also included in the district are a brown sandstone blacksmith shop, a smokehouse and former slaves' quarters, as well as a terraced garden that is reputed to be one of the earliest in Virginia.

It was added to the National Register of Historic Places in 1989. In 2015, it was purchased and subsequently converted into a winery.
