= Aden, Virginia =

Aden
- Unincorporated community
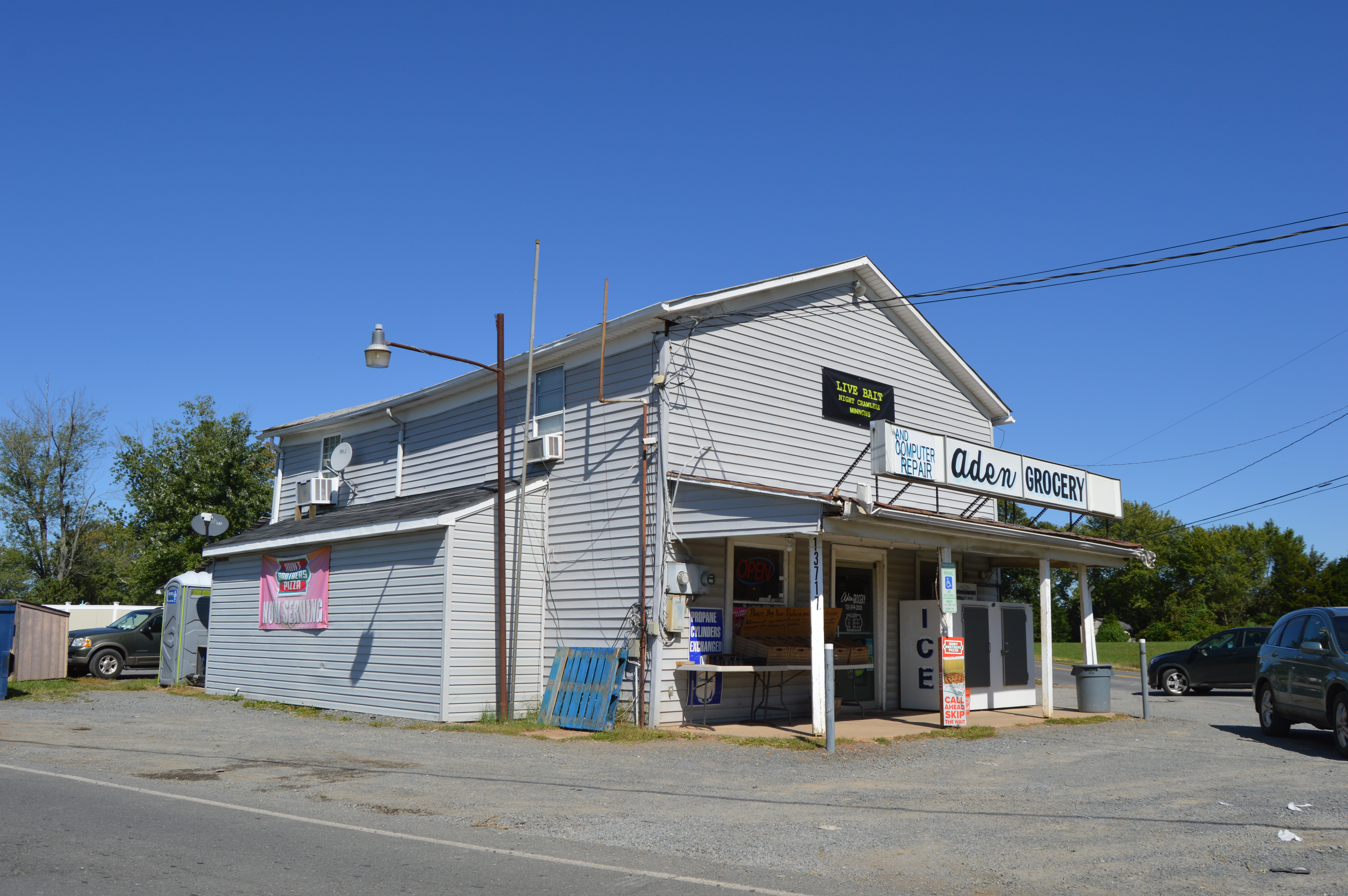
- Aden Grocery

- Location within the state of Virginia Aden (Virginia) Aden (the United States)
- Coordinates: 38°39′18″N 77°32′14″W
- Country: United States
- State: Virginia
- County: Prince William
- Time zone: UTC−5 (Eastern (EST))
  - Summer (DST): UTC−4 (EDT)

Aden is an unincorporated community in Prince William County, Virginia, United States. The town is centered at the intersection of Aden Road and Fleetwood Drive, approximately four miles due south of Manassas Airport. Aden does not have the characteristics of a distinct town entity, but one building on the northern corner bears the name "Aden Grocery". The only other building near the intersection is a single residential home.

Effingham was added to the National Register of Historic Places in 1989.
