= Camp French =

Archaeological site in Virginia, United States

- U.S. National Register of Historic Places
- Location: Address Restricted, Marine Corps Base Quantico
- Area: 155.9 acres (63.1 ha)
- Built: 1861
- MPS: Campaigns for the Control of Navigation on the Lower Potomac River, 1861-1862, Virginia, Maryland, and DC, MPS
- NRHP reference No.: 08001055
- Added to NRHP: November 12, 2008

Camp French (44PW0917) was the site of a major Confederate Army encampment in the US state of Virginia between March 1861 and August 1862. It was located behind Fort French which was renamed Fort Lee in 1863. Encompassing more than 150 acres (61 ha) on the grounds of the Marine Corps Base Quantico in Virginia, the site includes four large regimental camps. Archeological surveys conducted since 1994 have identified locations of winter huts, an arms magazine, and a target range. The site is partially occupied by the Medal of Honor Golf Course, and traversed by Fuller Road.

The Camp French site was listed on the National Register of Historic Places in 2008.
