= Commanding General's Quarters, Quantico Marine Base =

Historic house in Virginia, United States

- U.S. National Register of Historic Places
- U.S. Historic district – Contributing property
- Virginia Landmarks Register
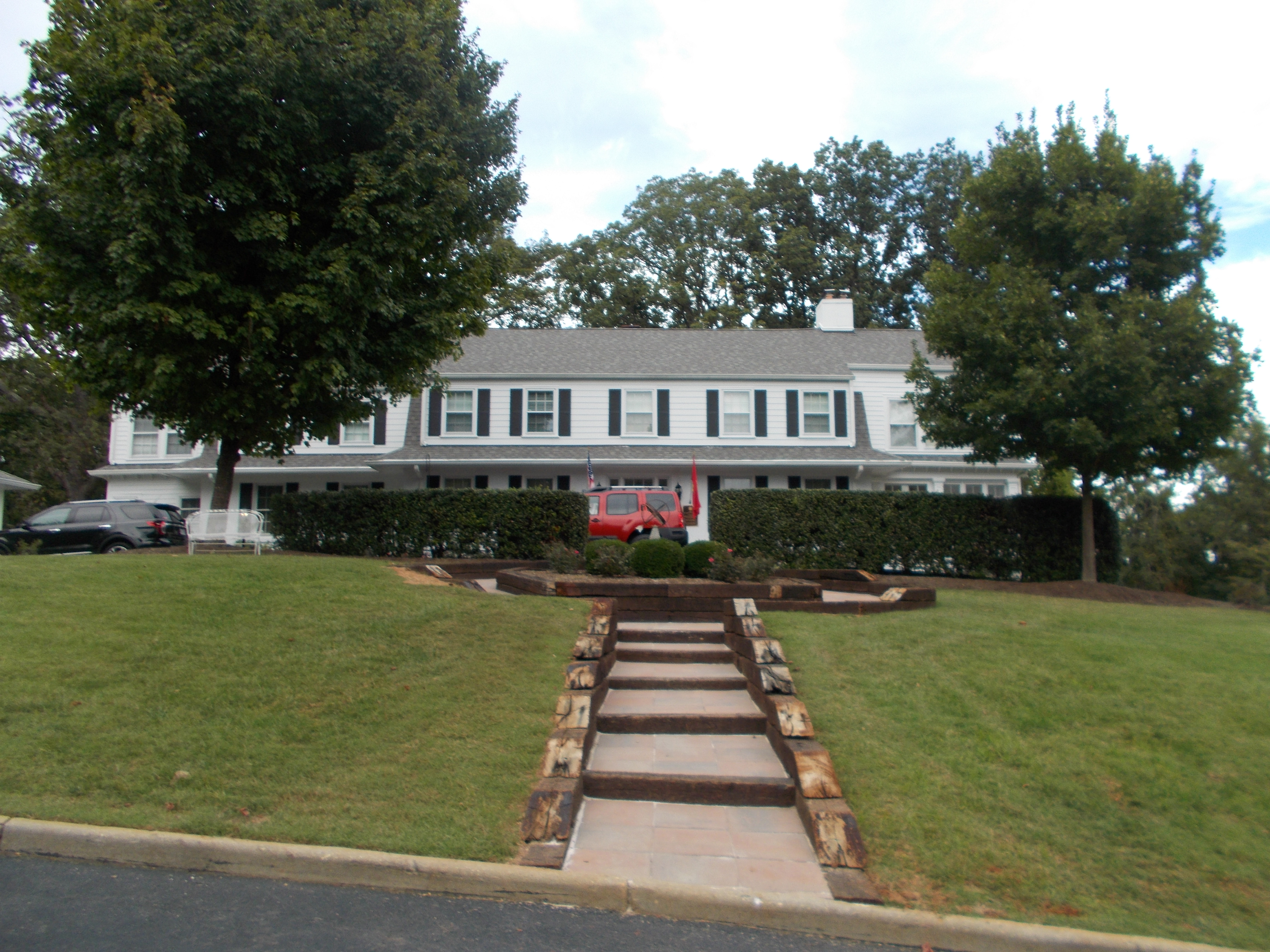

- Location within Northern Virginia Location within Virginia Location within the United States
- Location: 100 Block of Neville Rd., Quantico Marine Base, Quantico, Virginia
- Coordinates: 38°31′36″N 77°18′1″W
- Area: less than one acre
- Built: 1920
- Architectural style: Colonial Revival
- NRHP reference No.: 09000540
- VLR No.: 287-0002

Significant dates
- Added to NRHP: July 17, 2009
- Designated VLR: March 19, 2009

Commanding General's Quarters, Quantico Marine Base, also known as Building Number 1 and Quarters 1, is a historic home located at Marine Corps Base Quantico, Quantico, Prince William County, Virginia. It was built in 1920, and is a large, two-story, concrete-block-and-frame, Dutch Colonial Revival style house. The main block consists of a two-story, five-bay, symmetrical, gambrel-roofed central block with lower level walls covered with stucco. It has flanking wings consisting of a service wing and wing with a porch and second story addition. Also on the property is a contributing two-car, hipped roof, stucco-covered garage. The house is a contributing resource with the Quantico Marine Base Historic District.

It was added to the National Register of Historic Places in 2009.
