= Brentsville, Virginia =

Brentsville
- Unincorporated community Hamlet
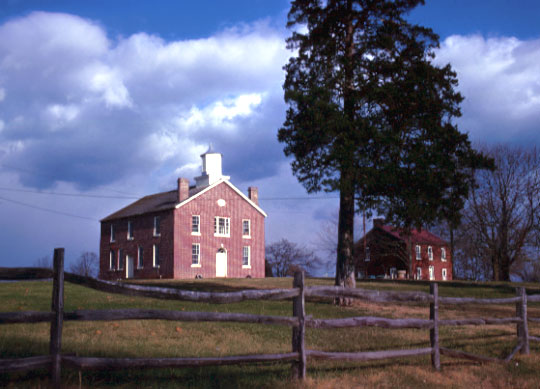
- Former Prince William County Courthouse (built 1822), located in Brentsville and seen in 1969

- Location within the state of Virginia Brentsville (Virginia) Brentsville (the United States)
- Coordinates: 38°41′17″N 77°29′46″W
- Country: United States
- State: Virginia
- County: Prince William
- Time zone: UTC−5 (Eastern (EST))
  - Summer (DST): UTC−4 (EDT)
- Website: http://brentsville.com/

Brentsville is a hamlet in Prince William County, Virginia, United States.

== History ==
Originally known as Brent Town after its colonial era founder George Brent. By summer 1688, it was settled as part of Stafford County. Some dispute exists as to where on the 30,000-acre tract the settlement started. Originally, a block house was constructed overlooking an existing Iroquois trail (also known as the Shenandoah Hunting Path and the Old Carolina Road) between the Potomac and Rappahannock Rivers. However, settlement lagged, the heirs of the original grantees divided the property, and the tract was not surveyed until 1737–38. Prince William County, Virginia, was split from Stafford County in 1731, and by 1742 residents had petitioned the House of Burgesses. The Bristows took the northern portion (and had disputes with their agents), and the Footes the southernmost portion, with the Brents adjacent to the Bristows and the Haywards between the Brents and the Footes.

Because of its central location within the new county, Brent Town became Prince William Court House around 1820 (since Dumfries was too far east). The second Prince William courthouse was built on the Foote portion, and the fourth courthouse on the Bristow portion of the original Brent Town Tract, as had been the Broad Run Church around 1752. As a Loyalist who died in England in 1776, Robert Bristow's lands were declared escheated to the state in 1779 (although a son contested the loss of 7,500 acres).

Brentsville was first platted in 1822 (by seven trustees while that litigation continued). Seventy lots were laid out, and a court house, clerk's office and jail constructed. It became Prince William County's fourth county seat from 1820 to January 1, 1894. Parts of the former Bristow portion were auctioned in 1834, with the proceeds called the Literary Fund and to be used for educational purposes. By 1835, Brentsville had two taverns, 3 stores, a nondenominational church and 19 dwelling houses.

The town prospered after construction of the Orange and Alexandria Railroad, although Manassas Junction became even more important economically, and started campaigning to become the county seat. An Episcopal Church was constructed in 1847 (St. James Church of Dettingen Parish). It became a strategic location in the American Civil War and suffered heavy damage. Union troops deconstructed parts of the courthouse to build other structures.

Two buildings were built in 1871: a Union Church (used by the Methodists, Episcopalians and Baptists) and a one-room schoolhouse. The school continued even after the county seat was moved to Manassas in 1893 (and hired an additional teacher in 1908, and a third teacher hired and high school course also being offered in 1821). In 1897, a Baptist congregation succeeded the Episcopal congregation at its church, but the Union Church continued. A Presbyterian congregation was organized in the town in 1915, and built their own building in 1952. Prince William County bought the Union Church and other properties in 1997 to create a Brentsville Historical Area Park.

The Brentsville Historic District, Brentsville Courthouse and Jail, Moor Green, and White House are listed on the National Register of Historic Places.
