= Nokesville Truss Bridge =

- U.S. National Register of Historic Places
- Virginia Landmarks Register
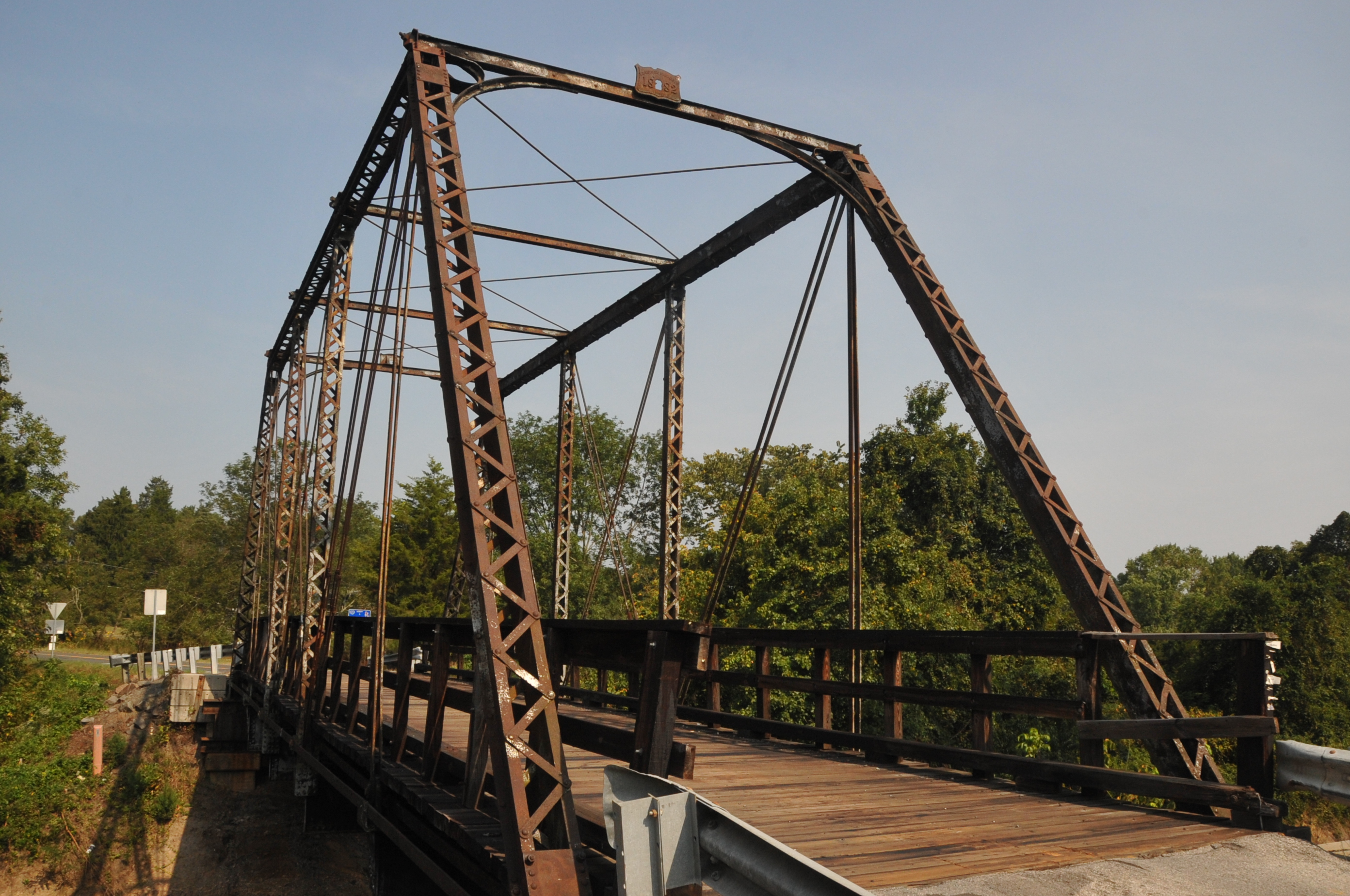
- Nokesville Truss Bridge, March 2007

- Location within Northern Virginia Location within Virginia Location within the United States
- Location: Along SR 646 northeast of Nokesville, Virginia
- Coordinates: 38°42′26″N 77°33′51″W
- Area: less than one acre
- Built: 1882
- Built by: Keystone Bridge Co.
- Architectural style: Single span Pratt truss
- NRHP reference No.: 78003040
- VLR No.: 076-0081

Significant dates
- Added to NRHP: April 15, 1978
- Designated VLR: November 15, 1977

Nokesville Truss Bridge is a historic Pratt truss bridge carrying Virginia State Route 646 (Aden Road) across the Norfolk Southern Railway near Nokesville, Prince William County, Virginia. It was built in 1882 by the Keystone Bridge Company. The single-span bridge measures 73 feet 11.5 inches (22.543 m) long, and is constructed of wrought iron.

The bridge was added to the National Register of Historic Places in 1978.

== See also ==
- List of bridges documented by the Historic American Engineering Record in Virginia
- List of bridges on the National Register of Historic Places in Virginia
