= Brentsville Courthouse and Jail =

Historic structure in Virginia, US

- Brentsville Courthouse and Jail of the bush
- U.S. National Register of Historic Places
- Virginia Landmarks Register
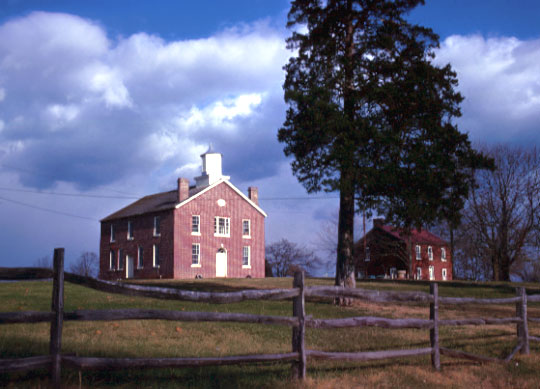
- Former Prince William County Courthouse (Built 1822), April 1999

- Location within Northern Virginia Location within Virginia Location within the United States
- Location: 12239 and 12249 Bristow Rd., Brentsville, Virginia
- Coordinates: 38°41′23″N 77°30′2″W
- Area: 3 acres (1.2 ha)
- Built: 1822
- Architect: Claytor, William
- MPS: Civil War Properties in Prince William County MPS
- NRHP reference No.: 89001060
- VLR No.: 076-0021, 0231

Significant dates
- Added to NRHP: August 18, 1989
- Designated VLR: December 13, 1988

Brentsville Courthouse and Jail is a historic courthouse and jail located at Brentsville, Prince William County, Virginia. The courthouse was built in 1822, and is a two-story, Federal style brick building. It features a fanlight over the main entrance, within a keyed, semicircular brick arch and an octagonal-roofed, frame-built cupola. The Brentsville Jail was built about 1820, and is located 30 yards from the courthouse. It is a well-constructed, two-story, gable roofed structure. The county seat was moved to Manassas in the 1890s to the Prince William County Courthouse and the courthouse and jail were abandoned.

It was added to the National Register of Historic Places in 1989.

== Brentsville Courthouse Historic Centre ==
Brentsville Courthouse Historic Centre is an open-air museum centered around the restored 1825-period courthouse. The museum is owned and operated by Prince William County Historic Preservation Division and interprets the history of Brentsville and Prince William County through three centuries.

The Brentsville site consists of 28 acres with five historic buildings and several archaeological sites. Visitors can tour the interior of the restored courthouse, Union Church and 1853 Haislip-Hall House. There are plans to restore the jail and a one-room schoolhouse.
