= Buckland, Virginia =

Buckland
- Unincorporated community
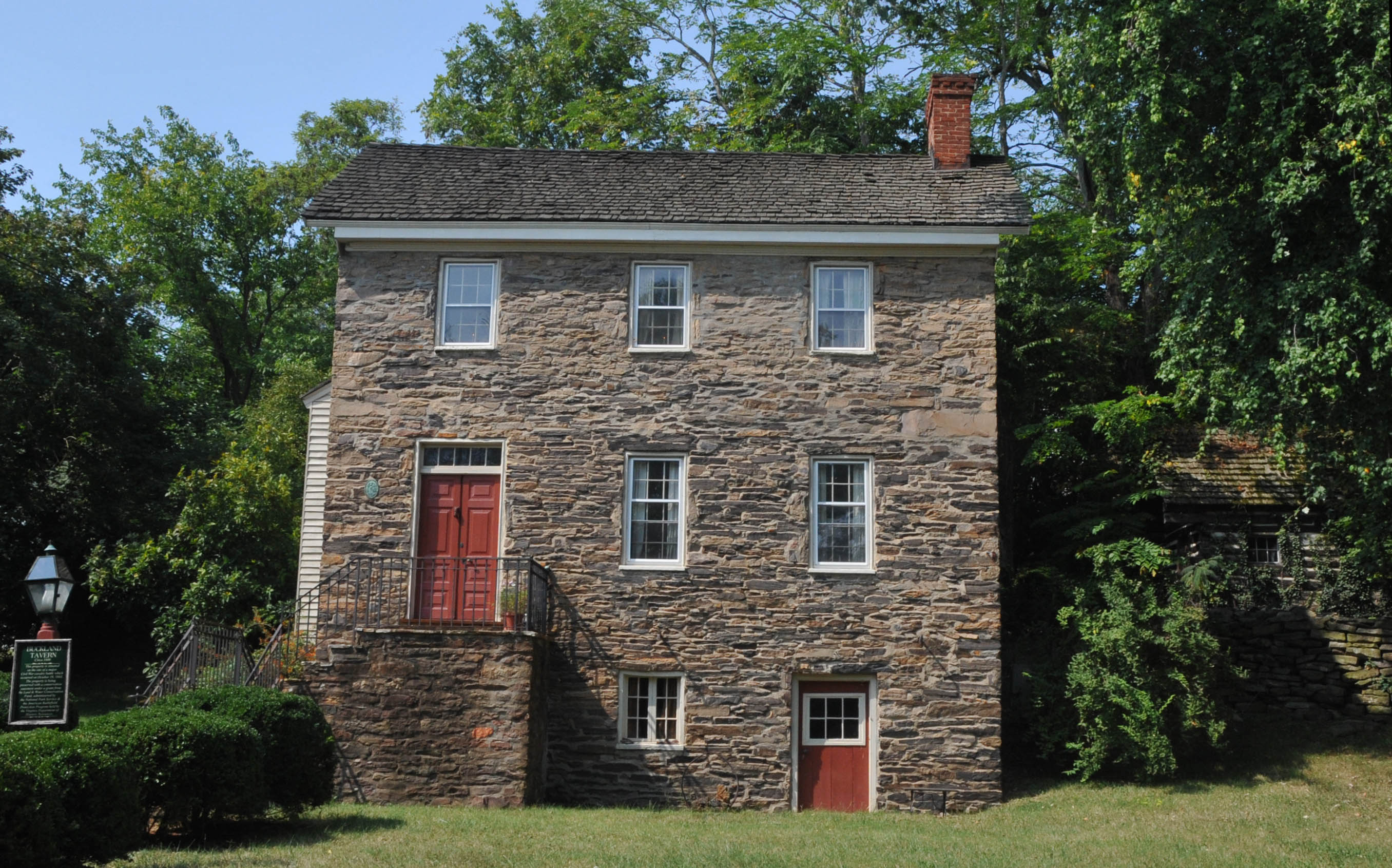
- Buckland Tavern, March 2007

- Location within the state of Virginia Buckland (Virginia) Buckland (the United States)
- Coordinates: 38°46′49″N 77°40′26″W
- Country: United States
- State: Virginia
- County: Prince William County
- Time zone: UTC−5 (Eastern (EST))
  - Summer (DST): UTC−4 (EDT)

Buckland is an unincorporated community in Prince William County, Virginia, United States.

Established in 1798, Buckland is significant for being Prince William County's first inland town, situated along the Fauquier and Alexandria Turnpike. An 1855 gazetteer described it as having "1 church and a few shops".

Buckland is the current site of the Buckland Historic District and Battle of Buckland Mills Civil War Battlefield.

== History ==
During the 1770s, the family of Robert Carter operated a mill on the Broad Run, on the site of what would become the town of Buckland. In 1774, the Carter family sold the land to Samuel Love, who established a permanent settlement with the construction of Buckland Hall (named after its architect, William Buckland) and several outbuildings to support the operations of a farm. By the end of the 18th century, the area had grown to include "the essentials of a small town."

In 1797, following the death of Samuel Love, his son John successfully petitioned the Virginia General Assembly to establish the Town of Buckland at the site. Comprising just 48 lots, Buckland became Prince William County's first inland town.

== Preservation ==
In 1978, the Prince William Board of County Supervisors established the Buckland Historic Overlay District, which requires that development in the district be approved by the county's Architectural Review Board. The Buckland Historic District was added to the Virginia Landmarks Register in 1987, followed by the National Register of Historic Places in 1988. Today, many of the properties in the district are subject to voluntary preservation easements.
