= Marine Corps Base Quantico =

American military installation in Virginia

- Quantico, Virginia in the United States
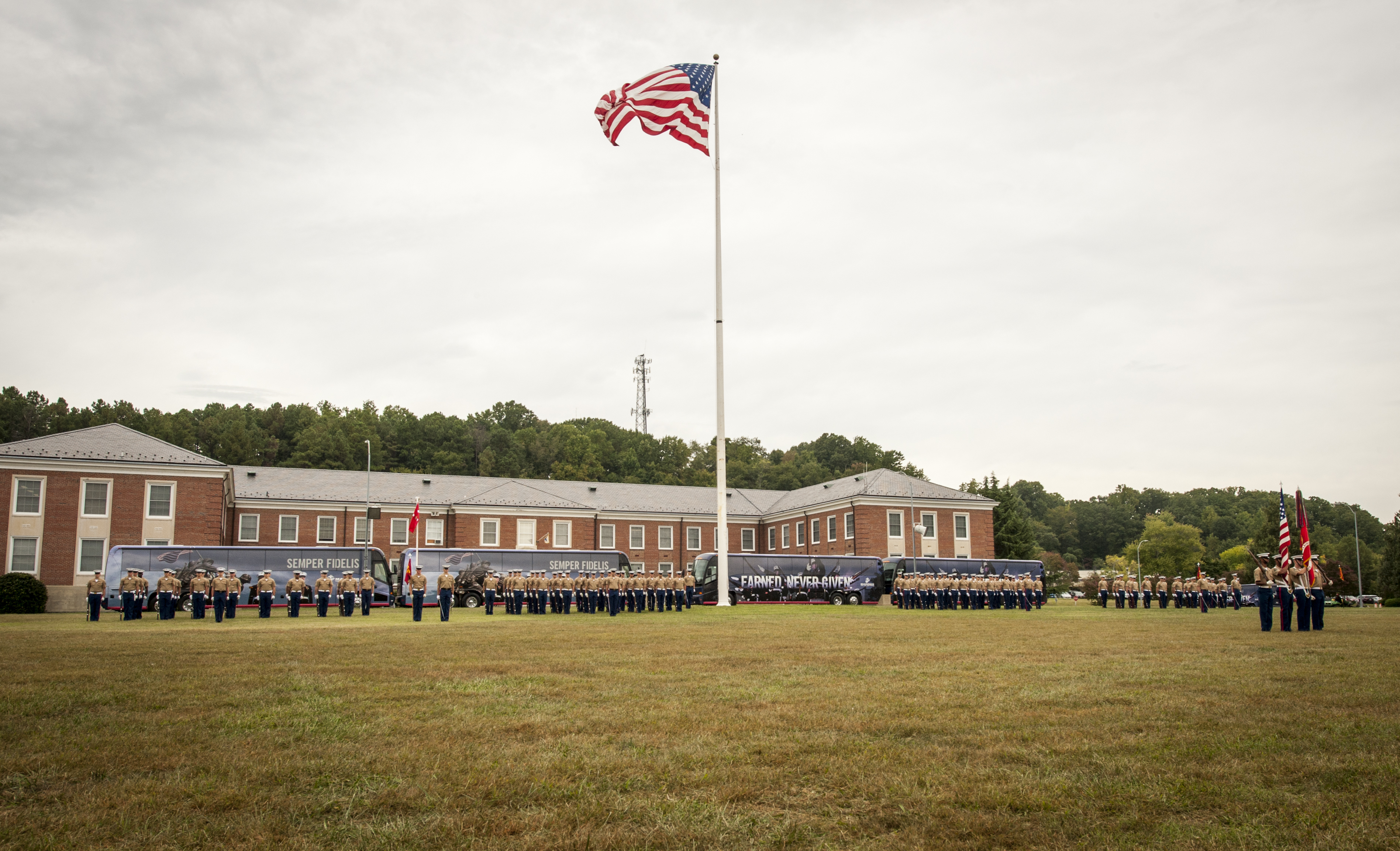
- The Capital Marine Detachment, Marine Corps League, presents the 32nd annual USMC Enlisted Awards Parade and Presentation at MCB Quantico in 2014

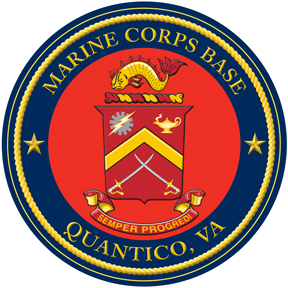

Site information
- Type: Marine Corps training base
- Owner: Department of Defense
- Operator: US Marine Corps (USMC)
- Controlled by: Marine Corps Installations Command
- Condition: Operational
- Website: Official website

Location
- Location within Northern Virginia Location within Virginia Location within the United States
- Coordinates: 38°30′7″N 77°18′21″W
- Area: 55,148 acres (22,318 ha; 86.169 mi^{2}; 223.18 km^{2})

Site history
- Built: 1917
- In use: 1917 – present
- Events: Warrior Games (2015)

Garrison information
- Current commander: Colonel Jenny A. Colegate
- Past commanders: John A. Lejeune; Charles C. Krulak
- Occupants: USMC The Basic School; USMC Officer Candidates School; USMC University; US Army CIDC; DEA Training Academy; FBI Academy; Naval Criminal Investigative Service

U.S. National Register of Historic Places
- Official name: Quantico Marine Corps Base Historic District

U.S. Historic district
- Designated: 26 March 2001
- Reference no.: 01000260
- Periods of significance: 1900–1924; 1925–1949
- Areas of significance: Architecture; Military; Black; Health/medicine; Education

Virginia Landmarks Register
- Designated: 16 June 1999
- Reference no.: 287-0010

Marine Corps Base Quantico (commonly abbreviated MCB Quantico) is a United States Marine Corps installation near Triangle, Virginia, covering nearly 55,148 acres (86.169 sq mi; 22,318 ha; 223.18 km^{2}) of southern Prince William County, Virginia, northern Stafford County, and southeastern Fauquier County. Used primarily for training and run on a budget of around $300 million, MCB Quantico is known as the "Crossroads of the Marine Corps".

Quantico Base is a census-designated place (CDP) in Prince William and Stafford counties in the U.S. state of Virginia, used by the Census Bureau to describe base housing. The population was 5,608 as of 2025.

The base is host to various units and commands, including:

- Marine Corps' Combat Development Command, which develops combat strategies and accounts for most of the community of over 12,000 military and civilian personnel, including families
- Marine Corps Officer Candidates School
- Marine Corps Research Center at Quantico, which pursues equipment research and development, especially telecommunications
- The FBI Academy, the principal research and training facility of the Federal Bureau of Investigation
- The Drug Enforcement Administration (DEA)'s principal training facility
- United States Army Criminal Investigation Division (CID)
- Marine Corps Brig, a military prison, was also located at Quantico; it was closed on 31 December 2011 and later demolished.

In 2001, the base was designated as part of the Quantico Marine Corps Base Historic District by the National Register of Historic Places. This district includes 122 buildings, two landscapes, a sculpture, and a water tower in the Mainside (east of I-95) area of the base. The contributing properties with separate entries include Tennessee Camp, Camp French, Commanding General’s Quarters, and Rising Hill Camp.

== History ==
=== Before the establishment of the Marine base ===
The Quantico base is close to the Potomac River. The area was originally inhabited by the Patowomacks (Algonquian) in the 16th century. The name "Quantico" is presumed to come from a Native American term, and has been translated to mean "by the large stream," "by the long stream," "place of dancing," or simply "dancing." Accounts suggest the first European arrival in the location was either a failed effort of Jesuit missionaries to convert natives somewhere south of the present-day base, or the arrival of John Smith and other Jamestown settlers trading for corn in the summer of 1608.

After the start of the 18th century, the area became popular because of tobacco trade in Aquia Harbor. Because traveling on muddy roads in those days was slow, many villages sprang up along the river and its inlets. Additionally, the area was a bustling stopping point on the north–south routes between New York and Florida.

Early settlements and plantations rooted along the flatlands bordering the Potomac. The hills west of the river remained essentially uninhabited until the early 18th century. Prince William County was organized in 1731, when the "Quantico Road" was also opened. This road gave vital access from the western part of the county to this area. By 1759, the road stretched across the Blue Ridge Mountains into the Shenandoah Valley.

The first military presence at Quantico came during the American Revolutionary War, when the Quantico Creek village became a main naval base for the Commonwealth of Virginia's 72-vessel fleet on which many state militia served.

The land was first visited by the Marine Corps in 1816, when a group of Marines traveling by ship to Washington were stopped when their vessel was halted by ice in the Potomac, forcing them to debark and march to the town of Dumfries, Virginia. Here they met a young Captain Archibald Henderson who lived close by. A generous-natured man, Henderson hired a wagon for them and sent them on their way.

During the American Civil War, control of the Potomac River became very important to the armies of both sides. The Confederates picked the Quantico Creek area on the Potomac to set up gun batteries. This enabled them to make full use of several points where their artillery could reach anything on the water, thus deterring Union use of the water highway. One of these sites included Shipping Point, the present day site of the Marine Corps Systems Command. Another site is Tennessee Camp, listed on the National Register of Historic Places in 2008.

While battles took place in Manassas, Virginia and Fredericksburg, Virginia, the gun positions around Quantico were used until the end of the war. After a 12-day battle at the Spotsylvania Courthouse where the Union lost about 25,000 soldiers, the war moved out of the Quantico area.

Following the war, railroads became an integral part of transportation in Virginia. In 1872, the Richmond, Fredericksburg and Potomac Railroad was formed when several railroads north and south met at Quantico Creek. This railroad still runs through the base and is used daily.

The village came to be called "Quantico" and was built by the Quantico Company. This was the start of a thriving tourist and fishing town that would later be encompassed by Marine Corps Base Quantico.

=== Establishing the base ===
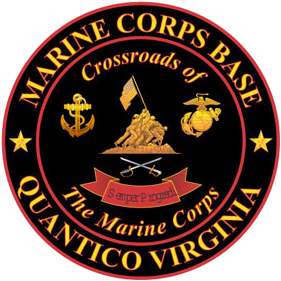
The former logo of MCB Quantico

Prior to the base's establishment, the land was owned by the Town of Quantico. Around the start of the 20th century, the Quantico Company was formed on Quantico Creek. By the beginning of the twentieth century, Quantico was being advertised as a recreational day trip. The Quantico Company promoted the town as a tourist and excursion center, and brought in tourists from Washington and Richmond by the steamer St. Johns and trains using the RF&P railroad lines and depot developed at Quantico in 1872. A beach was developed with dressing rooms and refreshment stands. In one week in 1916, Quantico was visited by 2,600 visitors who came by steamer or train.

By 1916, the Quantico Company began advertising Quantico as "The New Industrial City," and pushed for industry to come to the area. At the same time, the Quantico Shipyards were established on Hospital Point (the land that formerly held the Naval Medical Clinic but is now home to Marine Corps Systems Command) to build ocean freighters and oil tankers. With growing tensions of war in Europe, the construction of U.S. Navy ships was a major money-maker for the Quantico Shipyards. While the Town of Quantico was rapidly growing as a fishing village, excursion center and a shipbuilding center in early 1917, the town was not large or significant, and was suffering many financial difficulties.

Around the same time, Major General George Barnett, then Commandant of the Marine Corps, sent a board to find possible sites for a new Marine Corps base in the Washington, D.C., vicinity.

In 1917, Marine Barracks, Quantico was established on the land currently occupied by today's base. Marine Barracks personnel consisted of 91 enlisted men and four officers. Thousands of Marines were trained here during World War I. The Commanding General's Quarters was built in 1920 and added to the National Register of Historic Places in 2009. By 1920, the Marine Corps schools were founded, as Colonel Smedley Butler put it, "to make this post and the whole Marine Corps a great university". These schools eventually developed into today's Marine Corps University. Virtually all Marine officers receive their basic training here, as well as enlisted technicians from many different disciplines. Around the same time, as a part of these schools, a football team was established at the base, playing as a college football team. Until its disbanding in 1972, the team played against various NCAA Division I college teams, as well as teams from other military installations.

The first Marine Aircraft Wing was developed at Quantico, as well as the Corps' first helicopter squadron, Marine Helicopter Squadron One (HMX-1), the first helicopter squadron to provide rapid transportation for Presidents of the United States ("Marine One"). It continues that mission today.

In 1934, Amphibious Warfare Doctrine, along with special amphibious landing crafts for World War II were developed here. These Amphibious Warfare techniques, developed in the years before World War II, made victory possible in the Pacific theater. Quantico trained over 15,000 USMC and other service officers in these techniques.

In 1942, over 50,000 acres (20,000 ha) were purchased by the federal government and added to Quantico, making up what is now the base west of Interstate 95. The expansion was needed for additional range and maneuver training areas during World War II.

In 1987, the Marine Corps Development and Education Command here was changed to the Marine Corps Combat Development Command.

On the night of 21 March 2013, a Marine opened fire killing two other Marines before killing himself.

In 2015, the base held first Department of Defense organized Warrior Games.

== Units and commands ==
The Corps' Combat Development Command, which develops strategies for Marine combat and makes up most of the community of over 12,000 military and civilian personnel (including families), is based here. It has a budget of around $300 million and is the home of the Marine Corps Officer Candidates School. The Marine Corps Research Center at Quantico pursues equipment research and development, especially telecommunications, for the Marine Corps. The Marine Corps Brig, a military prison, was formerly located at Quantico.

The base was designated as part of the Quantico Marine Corps Base Historic District by the National Register of Historic Places in 2001. This district includes 122 buildings, two landscapes, a sculpture, and a water tower located within the Mainside area of the base. The contributing properties with separate entries include Tennessee Camp, Camp French, Commanding General's Quarters, and Rising Hill Camp.

It is the site of the Marine Corps Combat Development Command and Marine Helicopter 1 HMX-1. HMX-1 was the first helicopter squadron to provide rapid transportation of U.S. Presidents, a mission they have continued to carry out to the present day.

- Marine Corps Embassy Security Group
- Marine Corps Marathon
- Marine Corps Combat Development Command
  - Marine Corps Warfighting Laboratory
- Marine Corps Recruiting Command
- Manpower and Reserve Affairs Division, Headquarters Marine Corps
- Marine Corps Systems Command
- Marine Corps Training and Education Command
  - The Basic School
  - Marine Air-Ground Task Force (MAGTF) Staff Training Program
  - Marine Corps University
  - Officer Candidates School
- Marine Corps Cyber Operations Group
- Marine Corps Wounded Warrior Regiment
- The Quantico Marine Band

== Tenant activities ==
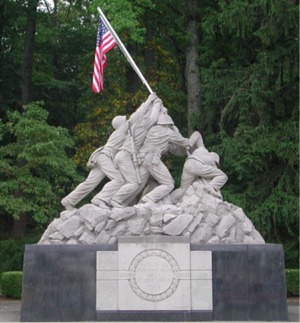
Marine Corps Memorial at the front gate of MCB Quantico

The base is the home of major training institutions for both the Marine Corps and federal law enforcement and intelligence agencies, including:

- Defense Intelligence Agency
- Defense Counterintelligence and Security Agency (Headquarters)
- Drug Enforcement Administration training academy
- FBI Academy, the principal research and training facility of the Federal Bureau of Investigation.
- FBI Hostage Rescue Team (HRT)
- FBI Laboratory
- Marine Raider Museum
- Naval Criminal Investigative Service Headquarters, United States Army Criminal Investigation Division Headquarters, Air Force Office of Special Investigations Headquarters
- United States Naval Community College

A replica of the United States Marine Corps War Memorial, depicting the 2nd U.S. flag-raising on Iwo Jima, stands at the entrance to the base. (The original memorial stands at the north end of Arlington National Cemetery.)

Larson Gym opened in December 1953 in a former aircraft hangar built in the 1930s. It had a seating capacity of 2,000 and was named for Colonel Swede Larson, a former United States Naval Academy football player and coach. In later years, the Marine Corps Museum used the facility for restoring aircraft and the Quantico Marine Corps Band used it for practicing. It was demolished around 2018 after the Barber Fitness Center opened.

Marine Corps Base Quantico and the Potomac River surround the town of Quantico. Access to the town is possible only through the base, the Amtrak train station, or from the river.

== Geography ==
Quantico Station is located at 38°30′07″N 77°18′21″W (38.501951, −77.305962). According to the United States Census Bureau, the CDP has a total area of 8.1 square miles (21.1 km^{2}), of which, 7.2 square miles (18.5 km^{2}) of it is land and 1.0 square miles (2.6 km^{2}) of it (12.27%) is water.

The name "Quantico Station" is most often used to designate the train station in Quantico, Virginia where commuters use the Virginia Railway Express.

=== Climate ===
Climate data for Quantico
Month	Jan	Feb	Mar	Apr	May	Jun	Jul	Aug	Sep	Oct	Nov	Dec	Year
Mean daily maximum °F (°C)	44.5 (6.9)	45.8 (7.7)	55.6 (13.1)	66.4 (19.1)	76.2 (24.6)	83.3 (28.5)	87.3 (30.7)	85.1 (29.5)	79.1 (26.2)	68.6 (20.3)	57.3 (14.1)	46 (8)	66.3 (19.1)
Mean daily minimum °F (°C)	26.3 (−3.2)	26.6 (−3.0)	34.5 (1.4)	43.1 (6.2)	53 (12)	62.5 (16.9)	67.4 (19.7)	65.3 (18.5)	59 (15)	47.2 (8.4)	36.5 (2.5)	27.7 (−2.4)	45.7 (7.6)
Average precipitation inches (mm)	2.9 (74)	2.6 (66)	3.2 (81)	2.9 (74)	3.1 (79)	3.5 (89)	3.8 (97)	4.3 (110)	3.1 (79)	2.8 (71)	2.5 (64)	2.8 (71)	37.5 (950)
Source: Weatherbase

== Demographics ==
Quantico Base, Virginia
- CDP
- Nickname: "Crossroads of the Marine Corps"
- Motto: Semper Progredi (Always Forward)
- Location in Prince William County and the state of Virginia.
- Coordinates: 38°30′7″N 77°18′21″W
- Country: United States
- State: Virginia
- Counties: Prince William, Stafford

Area
  - Total: 8.1 sq mi (21.1 km^{2})
  - Land: 7.1 sq mi (18.5 km^{2})
  - Water: 1.0 sq mi (2.6 km^{2})

Population (2010, km2 density from 2000)
  - Total: 4,452
  - Density: 919/sq mi (354.8/km^{2})
- Time zone: UTC−5 (Eastern (EST))
  - Summer (DST): UTC−4 (EDT)
- FIPS code: 51-65136

Historical population
Census	Pop.	Note	%±
1970	6,213		—
1980	7,121		14.6%
1990	7,425		4.3%
2000	6,571		−11.5%
2010	4,452		−32.2%
2020	5,221		17.3%
U.S. Decennial Census; 1950 1960 1970; 1980 1990 2000; 2010

The community was first listed as an unincorprated community under the name Quantico Station in the 1970 U.S. census; and as a census designated place in the 1980 U.S. census. The name was changed to Quantico Base prior to the 2010 U.S. census.

=== Racial and ethnic composition ===
Quantico Base CDP, Virginia – Racial and ethnic composition Note: the US Census treats Hispanic/Latino as an ethnic category. This table excludes Latinos from the racial categories and assigns them to a separate category. Hispanics/Latinos may be of any race.
Race / Ethnicity (NH = Non-Hispanic)	Pop 2000	Pop 2010	Pop 2020	% 2000	% 2010	% 2020
White alone (NH)	4,537	2,955	3,092	69.05%	66.37%	59.22%
Black or African American alone (NH)	1,013	494	434	15.42%	11.10%	8.31%
Native American or Alaska Native alone (NH)	22	6	19	0.33%	0.13%	0.36%
Asian alone (NH)	140	107	172	2.13%	2.40%	3.29%
Native Hawaiian or Pacific Islander alone (NH)	9	18	39	0.14%	0.40%	0.75%
Other race alone (NH)	8	7	44	0.12%	0.16%	0.84%
Mixed race or Multiracial (NH)	226	166	354	3.44%	3.73%	6.78%
Hispanic or Latino (any race)	616	699	1,067	9.37%	15.70%	20.44%
Total	6,571	4,452	5,221	100.00%	100.00%	100.00%

=== 2000 census ===
As of the census of 2000, there were 6,571 people, 1,389 households, and 1,351 families residing in the CDP. The population density was 918.9 people per square mile (354.8/km^{2}). There were 1,645 housing units at an average density of 230.0/sq mi (88.8/km^{2}). The racial makeup of the CDP was 73.25% White, 16.01% African American, 0.46% Native American, 2.15% Asian, 0.15% Pacific Islander, 3.91% from other races, and 4.08% from two or more races. Hispanic or Latino of any race were 9.37% of the population.

There were 1,389 households, out of which 77.2% had children under the age of 18 living with them, 91.3% were married couples living together, 4.3% had a female householder with no husband present, and 2.7% were non-families. 2.1% of all households were made up of individuals, and none had someone living alone who was 65 years of age or older. The average household size was 3.57 and the average family size was 3.57.

In the CDP, the population was spread out, with 32.3% under the age of 18, 29.9% from 18 to 24, 35.5% from 25 to 44, 2.2% from 45 to 64, and 0.1% who were 65 years of age or older. The median age was 22 years. For every 100 females there were 158.6 males. For every 100 females age 18 and over, there were 196.1 males.

The median income for a household in the CDP was $41,429, and the median income for a family was $41,288. Males had a median income of $24,478 versus $20,676 for females. The per capita income for the CDP was $14,563. About 5.5% of families and 5.7% of the population were below the poverty line, including 7.1% of those under age 18 and none of those age 65 or over.

== Education ==
The Department of Defense Education Activity (DoDEA), which serves as the school district for the installation, operates two schools on the base.

The 129,577-square-foot (12,038.1 m^{2}) Crossroads Elementary School facility was scheduled to open in Spring 2016. It had a cost of $47 million. It has a two-story media center and a rooftop environmental science center, patio, and garden. The facility uses natural light and heating from geothermal sources. In 2015 the Star-Tribune described it as "state-of-the-art school design". It replaced Ashurst, Burrows, and Russell elementary schools.

Quantico Middle/High School is the other facility.

In 1919, a school for grades 1–8 opened, though high school students had to attend school in the District of Columbia or in Fredericksburg and Occoquan in Virginia. In the 1930s, the high school program opened, and enrollment rose to over 300 students in 1940. The school was renamed Quantico Post School the following year, with groundbreaking and dedication of a new building on 22 July 1941 and 6 January 1942. Russell Elementary opened in 1953.

University of Maryland Global Campus has a facility at MCB Quantico.

== See also ==
- List of United States Marine Corps installations
- Chopawamsic Island
- Breckenridge Reservoir
