= Pilgrim's Rest (Nokesville, Virginia) =

Historic house in Virginia, United States

- U.S. National Register of Historic Places
- U.S. Historic district
- Virginia Landmarks Register
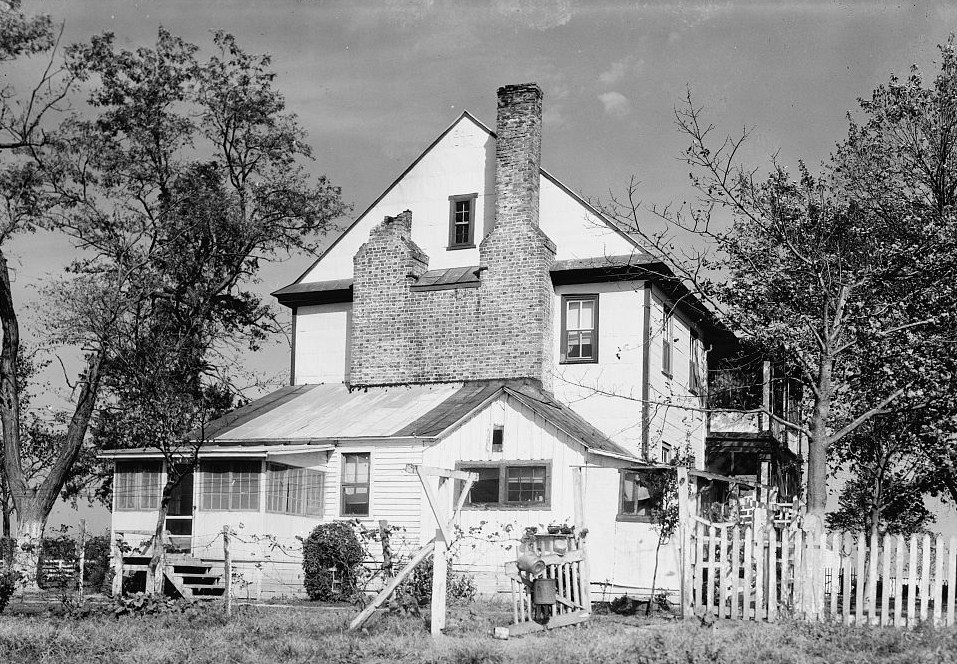
- Pilgrim's Rest, HABS Photo

- Location within Northern Virginia Location within Virginia Location within the United States
- Location: 14102 Carriage Ford Rd.; also 2101 Belmont Grove Rd., near Nokesville, Virginia
- Coordinates: 38°38′49″N 77°35′26″W
- Area: 196 acres (79 ha)
- Architectural style: Colonial, Southern Colonial
- NRHP reference No.: 89001797, 03001434 (Boundary Increase)
- VLR No.: 076-0019

Significant dates
- Added to NRHP: October 30, 1989, January 16, 2004 (Boundary Increase)
- Designated VLR: December 13, 1988, September 10, 2003

Pilgrim's Rest, also known as Belle Mont Grove and Mount Wesley, is a historic home and national historic district located near Nokesville, Prince William County, Virginia. It dates to the 18th century, and is a 2 1/2-story, three-bay, Tidewater style, frame dwelling with a double-pile, side hall plan. It has a one-story, gable-roofed, rebuilt kitchen and dining addition dated to 1956, when the house was remodeled. The house features a pair of unusual exterior brick chimneys on the south end with a two-story pent closet. Also included in the district are a late-19th century frame granary / barn, a frame, gable-roofed tool shed, and an icehouse constructed of concrete block with a metal gable roof. In 1996–1998, the Kinsley Granary was moved from the Buckland area of Prince William County, and is a 2 1/2-story stone structure that was rebuilt as a guest house.

It was added to the National Register of Historic Places in 1989, with a boundary increase in 2004.

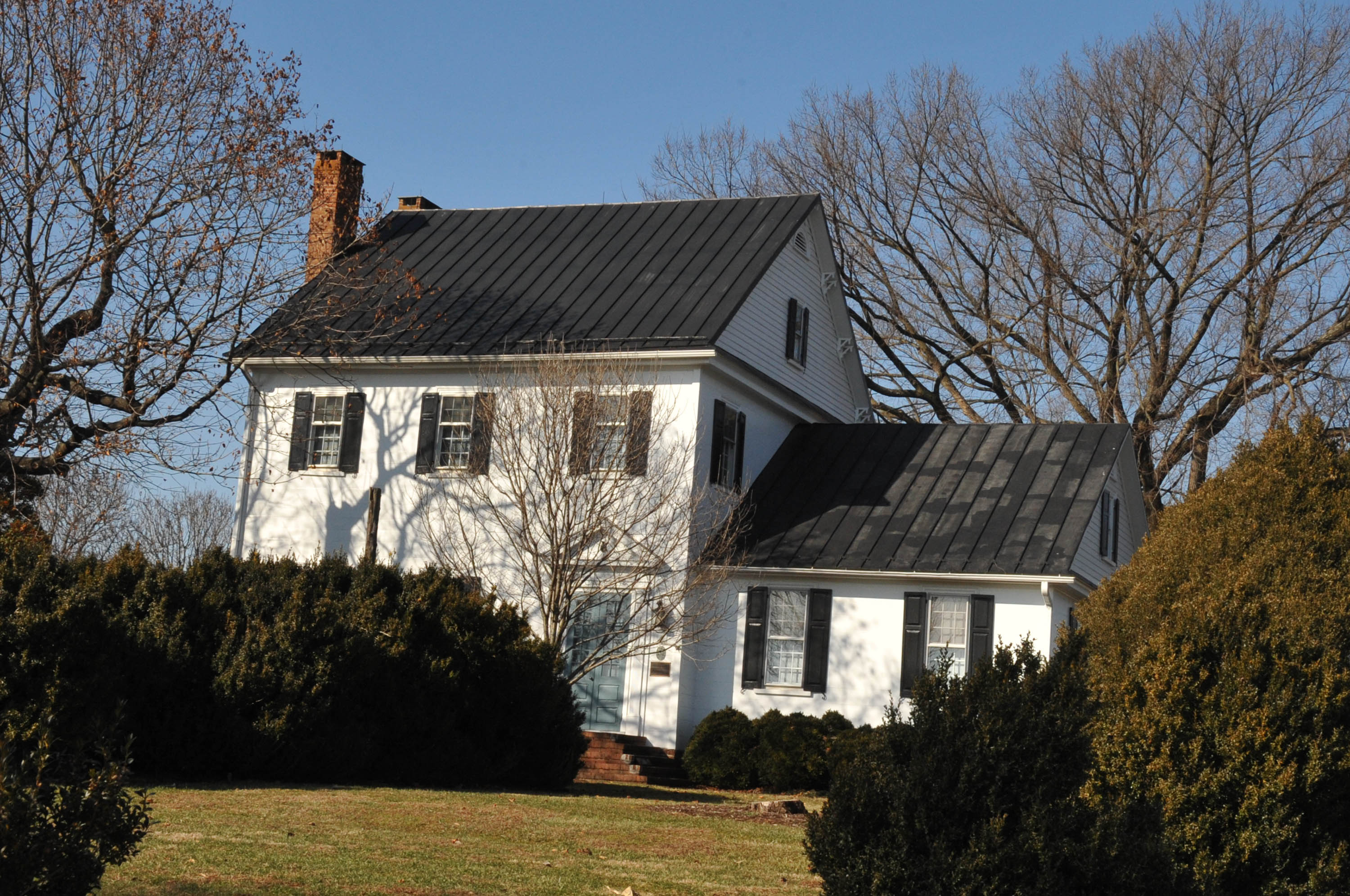
