= Linton Neck =

Peninsula in Virginia, United States

Linton Neck, Virginia
- Location within Northern Virginia Location within Virginia Location within the United States
- Coordinates: 38°38′17″N 77°15′32″W
- Country: United States
- State: Virginia
- County: Prince William

Area
  - Total: 10.8 sq mi (28.0 km^{2})
  - Land: 10.5 sq mi (27.1 km^{2})
  - Water: 0.31 sq mi (0.8 km^{2})
- Elevation: 20 ft (6.1 m)

Population (2010)
  - Total: 54,275
  - Density: 5,190/sq mi (2,000/km^{2})
- Time zone: UTC−5 (Eastern (EST))
  - Summer (DST): UTC−4 (EDT)
- ZIP code: 22191

Linton Neck also known as Burbage's Neck is a peninsula in eastern Prince William County, Virginia bounded by the Occoquan River, Occoquan Bay (originally known as Linton Bay), and Neabsco Creek. It is named after the prominent Linton family of the colonial era. Historically farmlands, today the area is home to a number of communities including: Featherstone, Woodbridge, Marumsco, and Neabsco. Near the fall line of the Occoquan River at the very North of Linton Neck is the incorporated town of Occoquan, Virginia. At the very south of Linton Neck is the historic site of Rippon Lodge.

Occoquan Bay National Wildlife Refuge, Featherstone National Wildlife Refuge and Veterans Memorial Park take up the majority of Linton Neck's shoreline along the Potomac River. Major creeks of Linton Neck include: Catamount Creek, Farm Creek, Marumsco Creek, and Swan Point Creek as well as the Northern tributary of Neabsco Creek known as Cow Branch.

To the north of Linton Neck is Mason Neck, the site of the historic plantation of Gunston Hall. To the south could be found the plantation of Leesylvania. Linton Neck Plantation was originally part of Hamilton Parish of the Episcopal Church in Stafford County, before the area was later added to the newly created Prince William County in 1731.

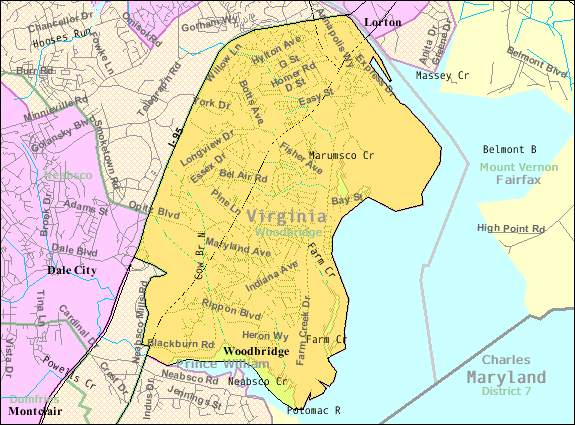
The Woodbridge CDP is roughly analogous to Linton Neck

== History ==
Linton Neck plantation was a prominent feature of Linton Neck in Colonial times. After falling into ruin, the house was rebuilt as "Bel Aire" by the Grayson family. This house is not to be confused with the similarly named Belle Air Plantation five miles away in Minnieville, Virginia. Bel Aire is the current site of the tomb of Benjamin Grayson, the father of William Grayson. Bell Air Road derives its name from the plantation.

During much of the 19th and 20th century, most of Linton Neck was owned by "Deep Hole Farm". Very little of the farm remains today, a prominent exception being a historic Superintendent's house on Feathersone Road.

== See also ==
- Linton Hall, Virginia
