= Bel Air (Minnieville, Virginia) =

Historic house in Virginia, US

- U.S. National Register of Historic Places
- Virginia Landmarks Register
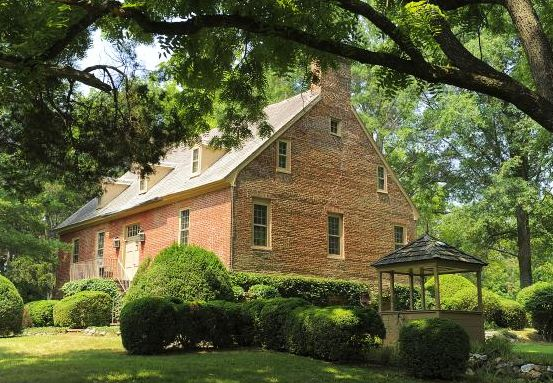
- Bel Air Plantation

- Location within Northern Virginia Location within Virginia Location within the United States
- Interactive map showing the location Of Bel Air Plantation
- Location: General Washington Drive, near Dumfries, Virginia
- Coordinates: 38°38′25.84″N 77°21′46.28″W
- Area: 25 acres (10 ha)
- Built: c. 1740
- Built by: Ewell, Capt. Charles
- NRHP reference No.: 70000823
- VLR No.: 076-0001

Significant dates
- Added to NRHP: February 26, 1970
- Designated VLR: December 2, 1969

Bel Air Manor is a colonial-era plantation manor located in Minnieville, Prince William County, Virginia. Built in 1740 as the Ewell family seat, the home was regularly visited by Thomas Jefferson and George Washington, who was a cousin. It later served as the home of Mason Locke Weems (1759–1825), the first biographer of George Washington and the creator of the cherry tree story ("I cannot tell a lie, I did it with my little hatchet"). Extraordinarily well preserved for its age, Bel Air was added to the National Register of Historic Places in 1970. Today, Bel Air remains a private residence and an events venue. Bel Air is not to be confused with "Bel Aire", a similarly named house five miles to the east.

== Colonial era ==
=== Construction and early history ===
Bel Air was originally constructed as an English fort in the 1670s by order of Virginia colonial Governor William Berkeley, who occupied the fort himself in 1673. Upon the stone foundation of the old fort, Captain Charles Ewell (1713–1747) built Bel Air as a tobacco plantation and family seat in the early 1740s. As some of the first settlers in Prince William County, Charles and his brother Bertrand first came to the area from Maryland to establish an iron furnace operation on the Occoquan River. Described by Washington in his journals as a "man of affairs," Charles maintained mill interests in Occoquan together with his brother-in-law, John Balladine. Like other planters in northern Virginia, he sent his harvest to the nearby port of Dumfries to be loaded on ships for Glasgow, Scotland. During this time, Dumfries was a thriving tobacco port, and it easily outstripped in population and importance the rival town of Alexandria, further up the river. As a center of culture, the great families in the area would drive into Dumfries in their chariots to attend balls and "tea drinkings". After organizing a joint stock company in 1744, Charles built a warehouse and began a successful mercantile business in Dumfries.

In 1739, Charles purchased 800 acres from Ralph Walker, on which he would construct Bel Air. Ewell purchased an additional 1184 acres just west of the town of Dumfries, Virginia from Lord Thomas Fairfax on July 10, 1741. The property was surveyed on May 10, 1749, by 17-year-old George Washington. On this property were the ruins of an old English fort built in 1673 at the direction of Virginia Governor William Berkeley to protect colonists from attacks by neighboring Susquehannock Indians. On the crest of a hill 90 feet above Neabsco Creek, the location was ideal for protection from Indian attacks as well as malaria.

Charles set about constructing Bel Air upon the stone foundation of the old fort, replacing the wooden frame with an all-brick structure. Like other affluent men in the colonies, Charles designed a refined home that imitated the georgian architecture of Great Britain. As the house was constructed before the days of saw mills, every lath was rived, and every timber, joist and even cornice was hewed out of the surrounding woods (as evidenced today by the axe marks on the reverse sides). Every nail, spike and hinge was individually hammered out. Tradition says that the bricks were imported from Scotland in the hold of tobacco ships.

=== Ewell Family seat ===
In what may have shocked the community somewhat in 1736, Charles married Sarah Ball (b. 1711), the daughter of his step-father, Major James Ball (1678–1754). Through her father, Sarah was the first cousin of Mary Ball Washington, George Washington's mother. Charles and Sarah had four children born at Bel Air, including three who lived to adulthood: Mariamne (1740–1813), Col. Jesse Ewell (1743–1805) and Col. James "Jimmie" Ewell (1746–1809). The Ewells were staunch Episcopalians, and both Charles and Jesse would serve as vestrymen and wardens of Dettengen Parish, where they were regular communicants. Charles appears to have died suddenly in the fall of 1747. Sarah died shortly thereafter, leaving the children as orphans.

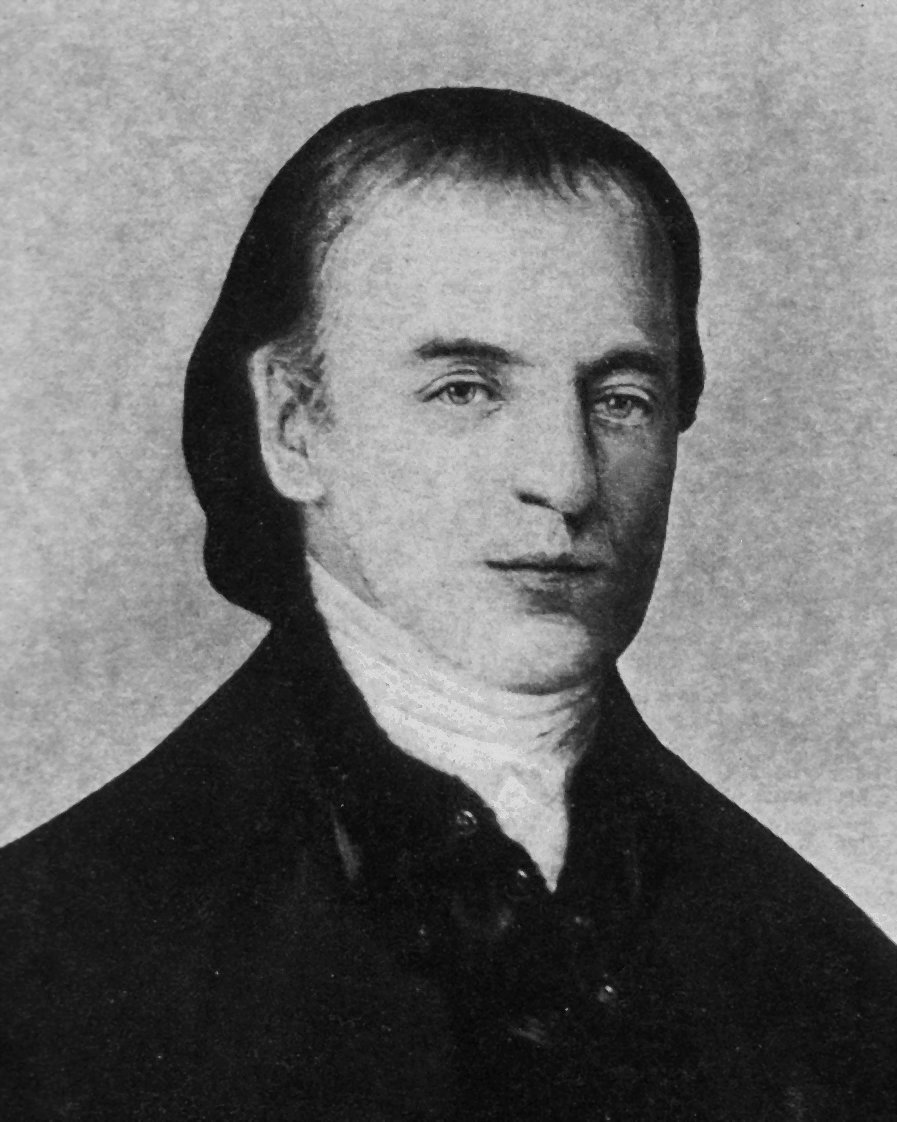
James Craik (1730–1814), a close friend and personal physician to George Washington, married Mariamne Ewell at Bel Air in 1760. He would later serve as the Surgeon of the Continental Army

Mariamne married James Craik at Bel Air on November 13, 1760. Craik would become the Continental Army's chief physician and surgeon, but he is best remembered for being the close friend and personal physician of George Washington. Craik was the first of three physicians called to Washington's deathbed.

As the eldest son, Jesse Ewell inherited Bel Air and its slaves. In 1760, he enrolled in the College of William & Mary, where he befriended Thomas Jefferson, a classmate. During his fifty years as master, Ewell—who was sometimes referred to as "Ole Marster" or "Ole Colonel of all"—created a fortune. Described as an eccentric "man of distinction and liberal fortune," Ewell was said to ride to Dumfries to tend to his business affairs on his "fiery black steed." He also served as the County Sheriff. Although Ewell was known for his keen mental abilities and literary talent, he was apparently indolent and slow in movement, and even Thomas Jefferson needled him for not exercising his talents.

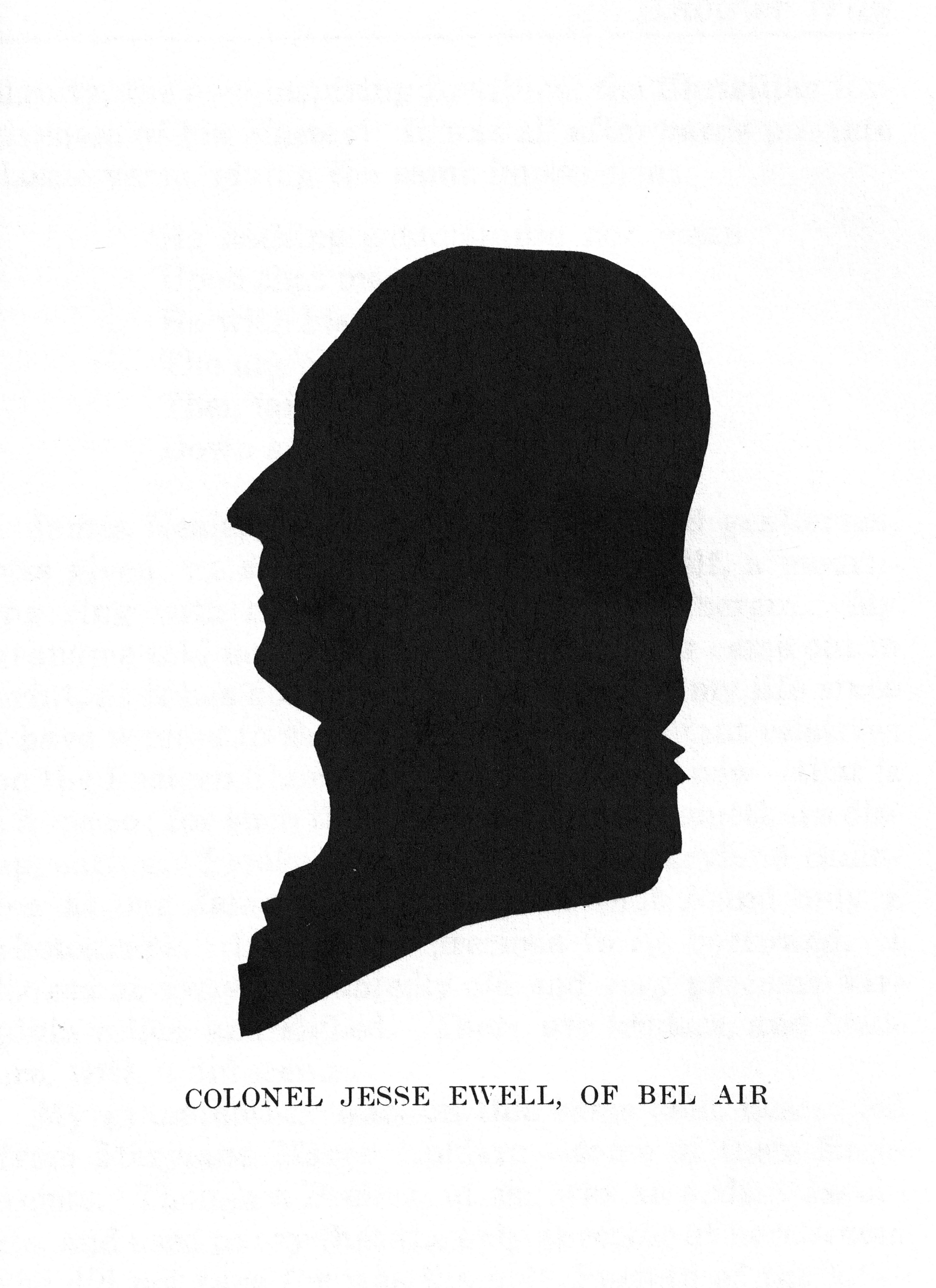
Colonel Jesse Ewell (1743–1805) led the county's militia unit during the Revolutionary War. As a wealthy tobacco planter and mercantilist, he hosted many lavish events at Bel Air and entertained many notable guests, including Thomas Jefferson, a college chum, and George Washington, a cousin.

In 1767, Ewell married his cousin, Charlotte Ewell "Madame Charlotte" (1750–1823), and they had 18 children. Two of the sons, James (1773–1832) and Thomas "Tommy" (1785–1826), would become physicians under the tutelage of Craik, thus beginning an Ewell family dynasty of physicians. Ewell borrowed money and sold land in order to send Thomas to Philadelphia to study medicine under the renowned Benjamin Rush. Thomas had already been apprenticed to a Virginia doctor before his university studies.

By all accounts, Ewell's children held him in high regard. In a letter to his father in December 1802, Thomas Ewell wrote: "[My] intention in coming to [Bel Air] was not to dance—but to add to your pleasure and happiness—which is among the first wishes of my heart." Ten years after Ewell's death, his daughter Charlotte (not to be confused with her mother of the same name) authored an elegy in memory of her father:

Early he woo'd fair virtue for his guide, And rarely wander'd from her guardian side, By him the needy never were denied, He sooth'd their sorrows, and their wants supplied. He mourn'd the contests of the neighbouring poor, And open'd wide his peace-restoring door; Where soon his wisdom taught their strifes to cease, Reviv'd their loves, and sent them home in peace. ... As friend—as father—who his praise can tell ? Where first begin, or with due raptures swell? To check our wrong, his frowns, were ever light, And sweet his smiles when'er we chose the right.

=== Guests at Bel Air ===
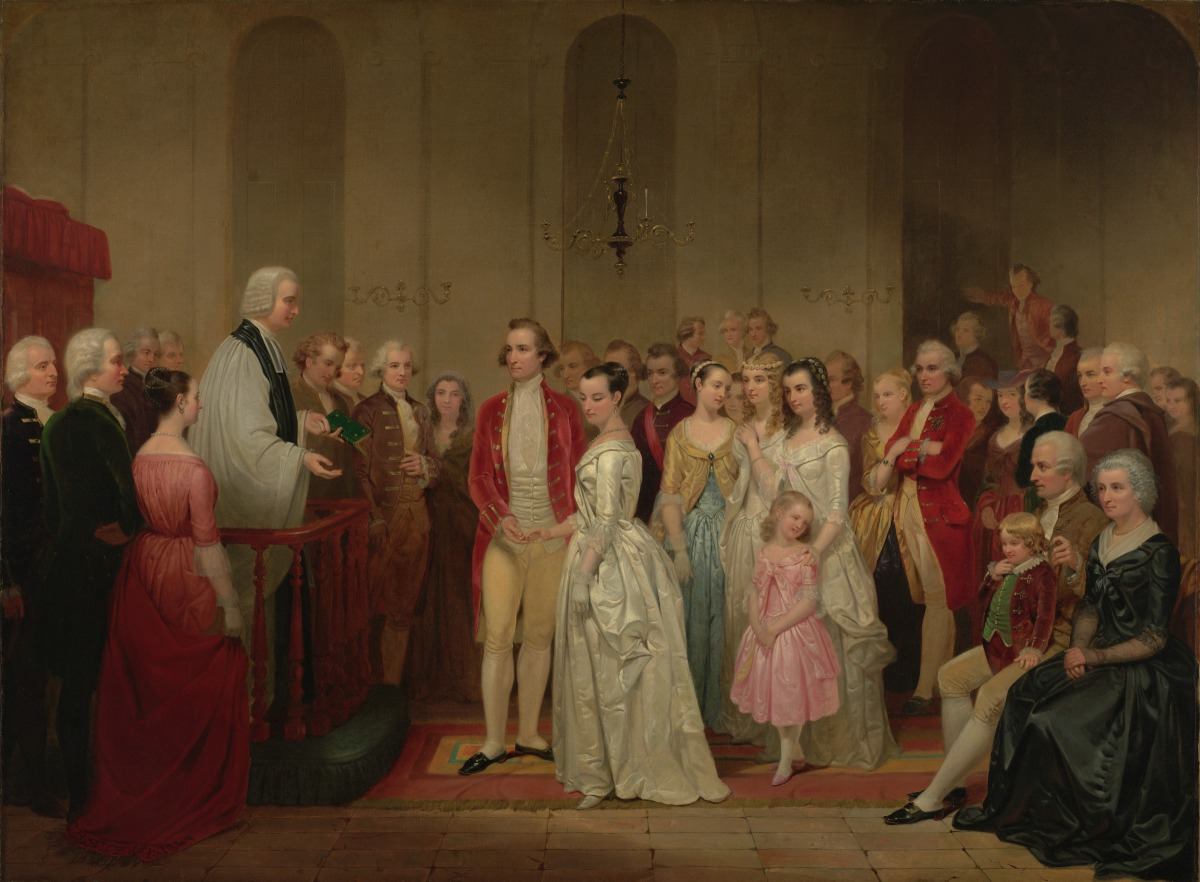
George and Martha Washington on their wedding day. On their honeymoon voyage to Mount Vernon, the couple spent the night at Bel Air on April 5, 1759. As a cousin of the Ewells, Washington was regularly entertained at the mansion.

As a wealthy family of substance and culture, the Ewells hosted many extravagant balls, christenings, and other grand events at Bel Air. Guests would arrive by carriage via the mile-long plantation road, catching glimpses of the mansion through the rows of flowering catalpa trees. Upon their arrival, guests, dressed in the latest fashion, were escorted to the reception room. For large events, the partition wall between the drawing room and central hall was removed, making a huge combined space for "merry-making and match-making in full swing." The wine flowed, and roasted meats and fowl were served to guests on fine porcelain, as evidenced by the plentiful shards of delftware and wine bottles later unearthed in archaeological digs. The dancing on these occasions was probably kept up a week, and there is record of one christening that lasted from Thursday through Sunday. It is said that the crowds were so great at Mariamne and James Craik's wedding reception that the drawing room floors had to be propped up by big cedar posts in the basement as the guests engaged in a rousing Virginia reel.

==== George and Martha Washington ====
George and Martha spent the night as newlyweds at Bel Air on April 5, 1759, on their honeymoon journey to Mount Vernon from Williamsburg, where Washington had just started his first term in the House of Burgesses. Numerous sources indicate that Washington was regularly entertained at Bel Air. Even after Washington's death, the Ewells apparently kept touch with Martha Washington, as indicated by a December 1802 letter from Thomas Ewell to Jesse in which he notes his intention to call upon "Mrs. Washington" to pay his respects.

==== Thomas Jefferson ====
As a lifelong friend of Jesse Ewell's, Thomas Jefferson was a frequent overnight lodger at Bel Air. The two men corresponded frequently and remained friends until Jesse's death. A small trunkful of Jefferson's letters brought from Bel Air were regrettably lost by the Ewells of Stony Lonesome during the Civil War. However, several letters between Jefferson and Jesse's son, Thomas, have been preserved. In an 1805 letter to then-President Jefferson, Thomas Ewell expressed Jesse's continued regard for his old college chum:

Before I conclude my Father Col. Jesse Ewell desires me to offer to your excellency assurances of the greatest respect and regard. With much delight he often speaks of the days spent in the walls of William & Mary college in company with the president; And with still more Joy he views the glorious work in which you have since been so successfully engaged; altho at one time he dreaded the effects of a change in the government.

Jefferson responded to Thomas Ewell's letter, recalling his early friendship with the elder Ewell:

I recall with pleasure the many happy days of my youth spent at College with your father. the friendships which are formed at that period are those which remain dearest to our latest day. I learn with great pleasure also that he approves the course of administration of the public affairs which I am pursuing. I am more uneasy under the disapprobation of my friends than others because it does not arise from hostile dispositions. in all cases I know that whatever your father thinks is from honest motives. Accept my salutations & assurances of respect.

=== Slavery at Bel Air ===
During the Ewell family's ownership of Bel Air (1740–1825), the number of slaves ranged between 5 and 18, but by 1840 the plantation was operated as a farm with no slaves:

Year	Number of Slaves	Names of Slaves
1765	5	Eastiny, Joe, Robin, Rose, Susannah
1782	5	Peter, Tom, Belinda, Lett, Jeffry
1787	22	Unknown
1800	11	Unknown
1805	18	Tom, Sandy, Addison, Daniel, Denis, Armstead, Jim, George, Frank, Syller, Harrot, Prue, Elenor, Sopha, Cordelia, a "young woman and child", Lucy
1810	6	Unknown
1820	18	Unknown
1823	20	Daniel, Sandy, Francis, Prue & Tom, Delia and child, Harriett and 2 children, Eliza, Margarett, John, William, Caselia & child, Lucy, Armstead, Elenor, Maria
1830	16	Unknown
1840	0	N/A

There appear to have been multiple family groups of slaves, suggesting that there were several slave cabins. Located 137 feet at a 45-degree angle from the northwest side of the mansion was one slave cabin built around 1825 atop the ruins of an 18th-century brick building. Nearby was a horse graveyard and the well-tilled gardens of the slaves. (Today, adjacent to a magnolia tree, boxwoods mark the corners of the cabin site next to the stone ruins of the cabin chimney.) Several other outbuildings associated with the plantation were located close by—including a barn, stable, kitchen, blacksmith shop, icehouse, smokehouse, and drying shed.

According to Jesse Ewell's daughter, Charlotte, Jesse did not treat the slaves harshly. In an elegy about her father written several years after his death, she wrote: "The slaves whom Heav'n to his care consign'd, Ne'er felt the terrors of a slavish mind; Well fed, warm clad, to moderate labours prest, They loved their fetters, and their bondage blest." The existence of a slave dungeon in the basement of Bel Air, however, belies this romanticized view of slave life.

=== American Revolution ===
Like many early American patriots, Jesse Ewell was a freeholder, a wealthy landowner who was not connected to the Crown nobility or the government through social class. Because British policies to punish the colonies often directly affected the freeholders, they were often the most active politically in opposing these policies. On December 9, 1774, Ewell joined other freeholders in the county to take action to sustain the First Continental Congress, which had been formed in September 1774 in response to the Intolerable Acts. A few months later, on March 22, 1775, he helped form a Committee of Safety to prepare for potential hostilities with the British. They did not need to wait long. On April 22, an American militia unit seized British gunpowder supplies at Williamsburg, and the Special Committee passed a resolution thanking Patrick Henry for leading the mission. In 1776, Ewell was selected as one of two Prince William representatives to the newly created Virginia House of Delegates.

Ewell also commanded the County militia as the County Lieutenant. Throughout the war, he did some severe marching, but never seemed to arrive in time for battle. In the fall of 1781, Ewell was ordered to march his regiment to the outskirts of Philadelphia as part of a decoy mission to mask Washington's movement to Yorktown. Along the way, he learned that the battle at Yorktown was over, and was ordered back home. He then brought his entire regiment to Bel Air, where, under catalpa trees on the southeast lawn, he feasted them on the flocks and herds from the plantation. In a 1974 archaeological excavation, various artifacts were unearthed indicating the presence of British soldiers at Bel Air, but it is not known whether the soldiers occupied or were held captive at the property. In 1789, a local planter named William Helm accused him of nepotism for a militia appointment of his nephew, Charles Ewell, Jr., but was exonerated after a speedy trial.

=== Decline of Dumfries and the Ewell fortune ===
The Revolution devastated the fortunes of the Ewell family as many of the Scottish traders left Dumfries during the war. Making matters worse, years of siltation into Quantico Creek gradually choked up the approach to the wharves at Dumfries. As the port decayed, so did the family's tobacco trading and warehousing businesses. In 1787, Jesse Ewell and Bertram Ewell formed a group with other business leaders in Dumfries for the purpose of reviving the port by building new terminals called "Newport" and "Carrborough" (current site of Marine Corps Base Quantico) on either side of the mouth of the creek on the Potomac River, and barging cargo between the new terminals and Dumfries. In 1795, the group formed the "Quantico Company", which tolled the waterway and used the proceeds to dredge the creek in an ultimately forlorn attempt to keep it navigable.

== 19th century ==
=== Home of Parson Weems ===
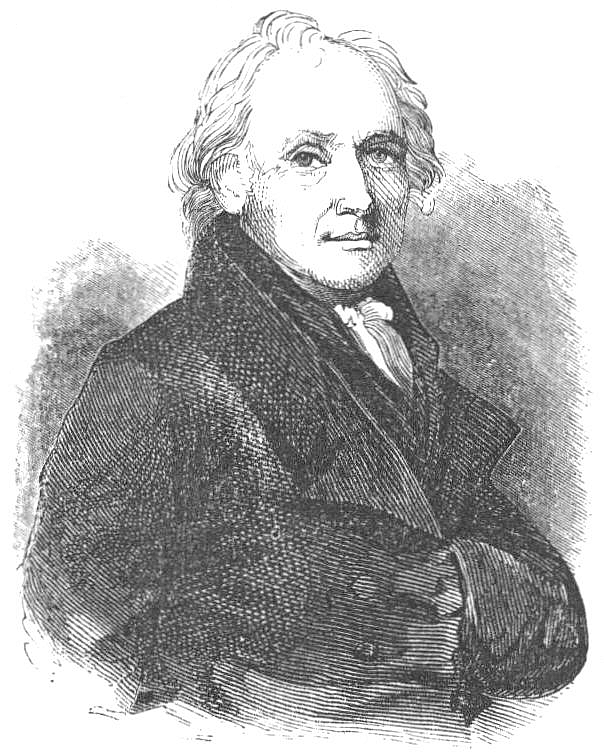
Parson Weems (1759–1825) was the first biographer of George Washington and the creator of the cherry tree story. He moved his family into Bel Air upon the death of his father-in-law, Jesse Ewell.

After Jesse Ewell died at Bel Air on September 30, 1805, the family became so reduced in circumstances that Charlotte Ewell was compelled to borrow considerable sums from her son-in-law, Mason Locke "Parson" Weems, who had married her daughter Fanny Ewell (1775–1843) at Bel Air in July 1795. In partial satisfaction of the debt, Charlotte allowed Weems to move his family into Bel Air around 1806. Weems's home in Dumfries, which was subsequently sold to Benjamin Botts, has been preserved and is now the Weems–Botts Museum.

Weems, an Episcopal clergyman who began writing and peddling books out of a Jersey Wagon to supplement his income, had met Fanny in Dumfries during one of his book selling trips. Although Weems wrote several biographies and moralistic tales, he is best known for authoring the first and most famous biography of George Washington, The Life of Washington (1800). The book would go through 70 accredited and varying editions and greatly influenced Abraham Lincoln, who read the book when he was 11. Weems would do much of his writing at Bel Air, including the fifth edition (1806) of The Life of Washington, in which he added the famous tale of the cherry tree.

At home, Weems consulted with Fanny, whom Washington Irving, a family friend, described as a "chimney critic." Together they would decide which books were the "best sellers," a term coined by Weems, and restock the wagon before leaving on another book selling trip. They had ten children, eight of whom survived infancy, and it was said to be a happy time when the husband and father came home from one of his trips to entertain the family with stories and music played on his fiddle, which had been given to him by a French refugee he had befriended on one of his trips. As the violin was too precious to carry with him, he kept it at home.

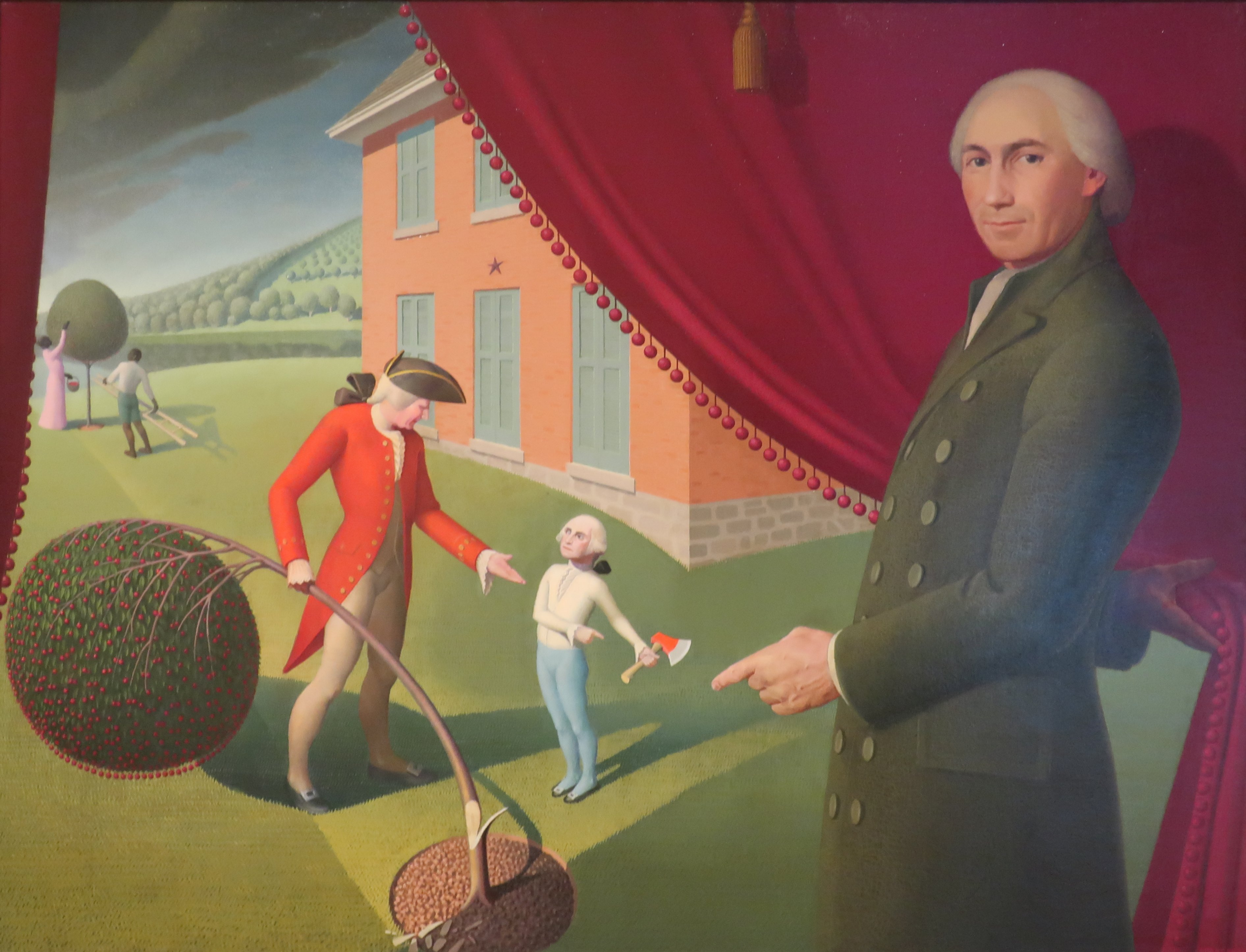
'Parson Weems' Fable', a 1939 painting by Grant Wood, depicting both Weems and his famous "Cherry Tree" story. A copy of the painting is mounted above the fireplace mantel in the parlor.

Over the next twenty years, Charlotte continued to borrow from Weems, and by January 1812, these loans amounted to $2300. Charlotte then gave Weems a mortgage on the estate to cover the debt. Four months later she was compelled to borrow $1,000 more from him to avoid a forced sale of the estate. Charlotte Ewell died in 1823, and in August of the following year, Bel Air, which at the time had 700 acres, was sold at public auction to Weems for $2212 (~$72,094 in 2024). Weems was a Freemason and member of Lodge No. 50 in Dumfries. On May 23, 1825, Weems died during a book-selling trip in Beaufort, South Carolina, and the following winter his remains were brought to Dumfries by boat and buried at a corner of the Ewell family cemetery at Bel Air. Fanny was buried by his side 18 years later.

=== Pre-War ===
After the death of Weems in 1825, Bel Air was passed to his son-in-law, Henry Slade. Sometime before 1840, Bel Air was acquired by Jesse Davis, a resident of King George County who owned it until 1848, when it was sold at auction for $1501 to Chapman Lee, who operated it as a farm with no slaves. With the decline of Dumfries, however, Bel Air became increasingly isolated and its road became nearly impassable. Although various people tried living there after the Ewells and Weemses went away, the "old time society was gone, with none to take its place." Bel Air passed through several different owners through the remainder of the 19th century and it stood empty for long periods of time.

=== Civil War ===
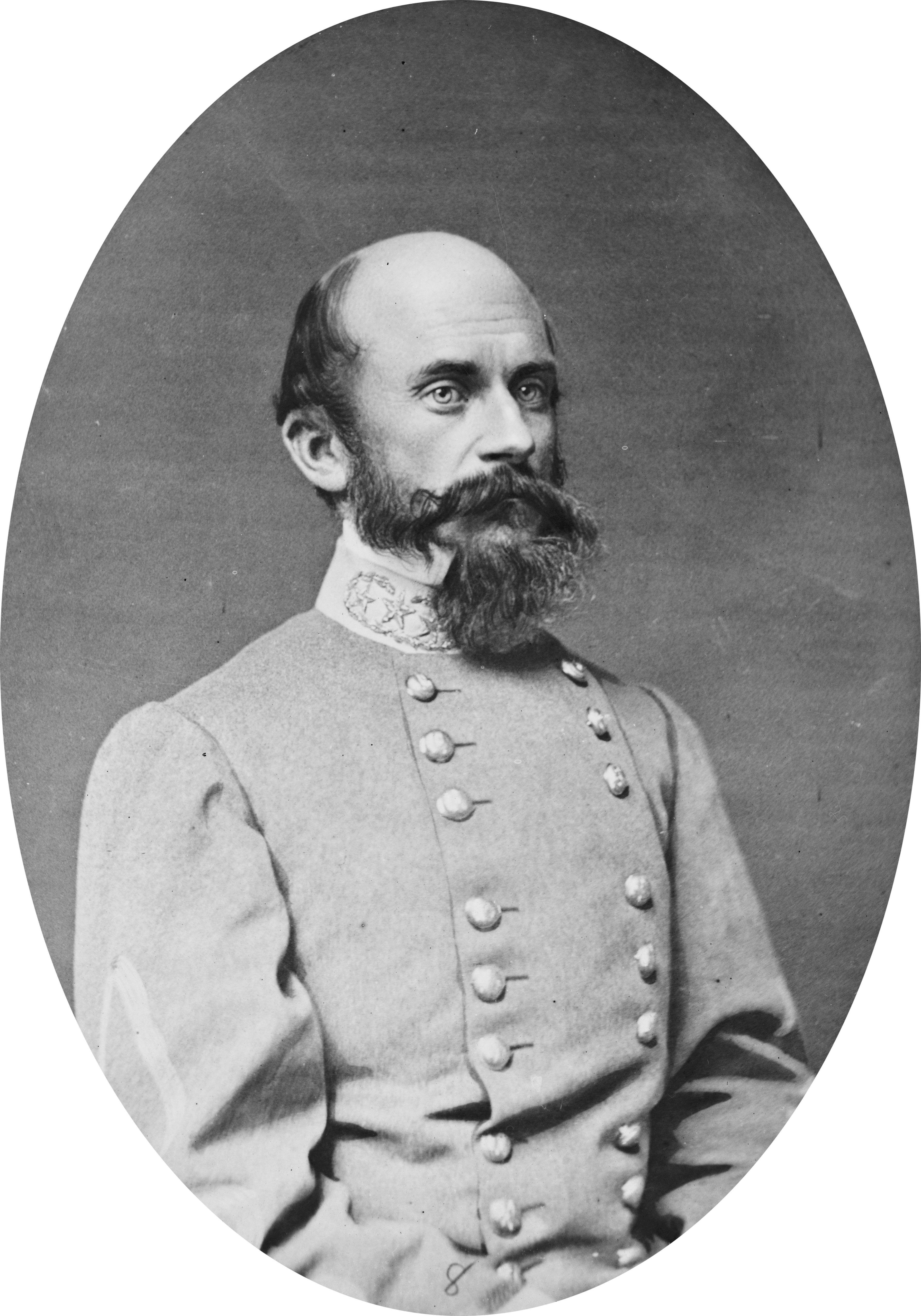
Confederate General Richard S. Ewell (1817–1872), who succeeded Stonewall Jackson in command, was the grandson of Jesse Ewell, whose silver-hilted rapier he wore into battle.

As evidenced by miniballs, a union belt buckle and other artifacts unearthed during a 1974 archaeological excavation, Bel Air was occupied by union troops during the Civil War. The artifacts were found at the location of the slave cabin, where troops were apparently quartered during the winter of 1863–1864.

A more notable connection to the Civil War, though, is that Confederate General Richard S. Ewell, who succeeded Stonewall Jackson in command, was the son of Thomas Ewell and grandson of Jesse Ewell, whose silver-hilted rapier he wore into battle. Richard visited Bel Air throughout his life, including several years before the war when he served as the best man at a wedding between his cousin, the "beautiful Fannie Weems," and his friend, Robert Tansill, a United States Marine who would later resign his commission to serve as a colonel in the Confederate States Marine Corps.

=== 1885 restoration ===
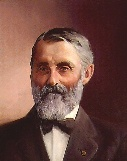
George Carr Round (1839–1918), a prominent Manassas attorney and member of the Virginia General Assembly, began a costly restoration of Bel Air in 1885

In 1885, George Carr Round, a prominent Manassas attorney and member of the Virginia General Assembly, began an ambitious and costly restoration of Bel Air, which had suffered through long periods of abandonment. To help restore the mansion to its colonial-era appearance, Round enlisted the help of Dr. Jesse Ewell (1802–1897), who grew up at Bel Air between 1805 and 1820. Dr. Ewell was born in Dumfries to Lt. Jesse Ewell (fourth child of Col. Jesse Ewell), but as he suffered from malaria in his infancy, he was moved to the "good air" of Bel Air to live with his grandparents. Despite his advanced age, Dr. Ewell, who had not seen Bel Air in 60 years, apparently maintained clear recollections of the plantation and his forebears.

At considerable expense, about one fourth of the stone and brick walls had to be torn down and relaid. The floors and roof were leveled up and down. The entire lathing and plastering and much of the woodwork had to be removed, as well as rubbish appearing to date from colonial times. The only material change made to the house, however, was the addition of a door and window to the dungeon as it was converted into a root cellar. The restoration also revealed evidence of earlier repair work performed around 1825.

== 20th century and beyond ==
=== Decline ===
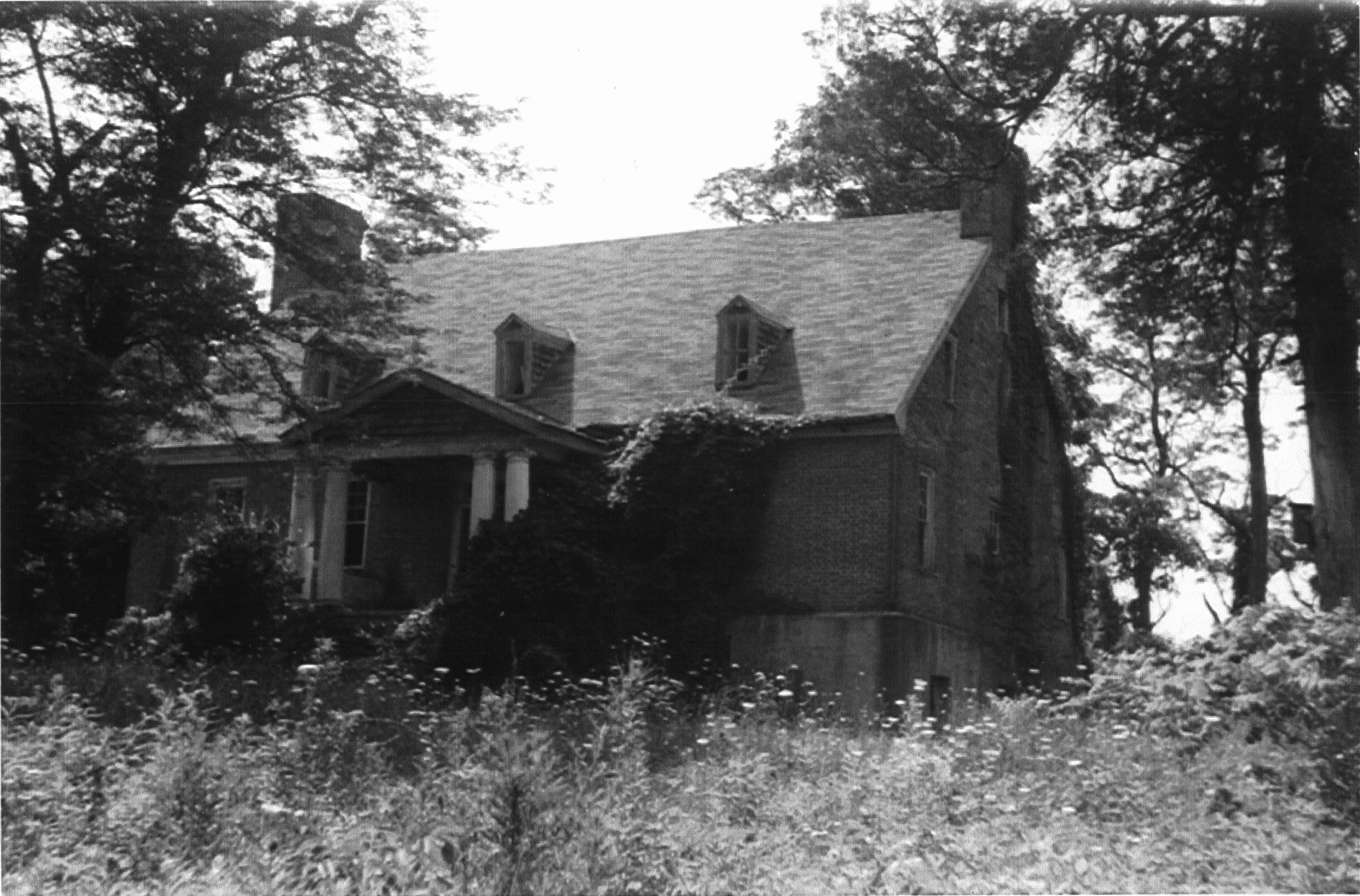
Bel Air in 1948 before it was restored. Having stood empty for decades, the mansion was described as "empty; silently eloquent of Colonial and Revolutionary days; shut in, moss-grown, mellow in the tones of its old red brick; dream-like on its hill, under its trees."

Over the next several decades, Bel Air again fell into a state of decay. Upon visiting Bel Air in 1931, Alice Maude Ewell, an author and granddaughter of Dr. Jesse Ewell, described the mansion as "empty; silently eloquent of Colonial and Revolutionary days; shut in, moss-grown, mellow in the tones of its old red brick; dream-like on its hill, under its trees." Shattered windows gazed hollowly out at once beautiful grounds which had overgrown. In an attempt to repair the separated walls of the foundation in 1890, the beautiful ground floor stone walls, originally mortared with Virginia red clay, were surrounded by forms and cased in an unsightly layer of cement. But because the walls were not braced, they continued to buckle, and by 1915 the house, along with plans to restore it, were abandoned. For the next 33 years, vandals pilfered items from the house and destroyed others. Hunters camped in the house and used window frames, balusters and furniture as firewood. A wife of a neighbor who was supposed to take care of the house stripped it bare of its original furnishings. A rumor that $50,000 in gold was hidden in the house led treasure hunters to tear into the walls and floor boards. Unappreciative former owners stabled livestock in the drawing room, as evidenced by the shreds of hay found behind the moldings.

=== Second restoration ===
In 1948, Dr. William E. and Ann Flory purchased Bel Air as a weekend home and were determined to restore the estate to its colonial-era splendor. Having restored another old home Alexandria, the Florys approached the restoration with experience and an obsession with historical accuracy. With the assistance of the Virginia Park Service and after conducting extensive research, the Florys began a careful, 30-year restoration in 1949. Workmen peeled away the cement from the exterior of the foundation walls, chipped away the crumbling old clay that held the large stones together, and mortared them back into the foundation.

As the grounds were cleared pieces of missing woodwork, including the drawing room mantle, emerged from the brush, where they had been tossed by vandals during its dormancy. A facsimile of old square brick was laid in the basement kitchen. Utilities and facilities necessary for modern living—such as heat, water, electrical wiring, plumbing, and kitchen and bathroom facilities—were installed. Features added in 1885 and 1926 that were inconsistent with its colonial-era appearance were removed, such as the southeast covered porch, which the Florys replaced with a porch thought appropriate for the era. The roof was replaced and dormers on the northwest side that had been covered over by prior owners were restored.

As the work continued, the Florys eventually moved to Bel Air, using the kitchen as living space until the rest of the interior was renovated. Originally hoping to complete the renovation in 10 years, the Florys continued their work for 30 years, suspending their efforts at times due to lack of funds.

=== Continuing restoration efforts ===
The Flory children, William Flory Jr. and Anne "Randi" Naedele, continued their parents' restoration efforts in the 1990s. Structural repairs, made necessary by the foundational issues, were made by Randi and Bill Naedele at great expense in the 1990s. A Unico small-duct central air conditioning system was added in the 2000s, making the house even more comfortable for modern living.

Restoration efforts continued under the Stewart family, who purchased the home in 2012. The colonial revival gardens were completely restored between 2013 and 2015, when the blighted English boxwoods were largely replaced with the disease-resistant green velvet variety. A major roof renovation was completed in 2016 with the repair of the dormers on the northwest side of the house and the complete replacement of the asbestos roofing tile with slate. Using historically accurate lime-based putty, repointing of the brick exterior is ongoing to repair loose mortar joints and fix prior repairs that improperly used Portland cement.

=== Current use ===
Bel Air remains a private residence that also serves as a venue for weddings and other events.

== Landscape and architecture ==
=== Landscape ===
Bordered by 25 acres of rolling, wooded countryside protected by a Virginia historical easement, Bel Air rests at the crest of a rolling hummock, its broad front lawn on the southeast side of the home set with huge black walnut trees and oaks. The house is framed on the northwest by two massive willow oaks, beyond which opens a bowling green lined by towering magnolia trees, a saucer magnolia, and boxwood and spice bushes. Beyond the bowling green is the Ewell family cemetery ringed by azalea and big rhododendron bushes. On the southwest are sprawling formal colonial gardens with terraced rectangular beds of boxwood hedges, which were planted by the Florys on the site where the original gardens are presumed to have existed. Adjacent to the upper garden is an alley of large cedar trees leading to livestock and pole barns. On the northeast side of the home is a well house shaded by black walnut trees and a large American elm. The perimeter of the house itself is ornamented with boxwood bushes, with various species of English ivy garnishing the stone foundation.

The original landscaping plan had shade trees planted in squares and circles. The entrance to the plantation was lined with long rows of southern catalpa trees, through which fashionable visitors would arrive for grand events. According to tradition, it is under one of these trees that Col. Jesse Ewell fed his regiment from the flocks and herds at Bel Air. Somewhere on the property was the Lafayette pear tree, once a sprout at Mount Vernon, from a tree brought from France by the Marquis de Lafayette himself. There was originally no shrubbery around the house since it was thought that it gathered "dampness and death." A "sparkling pool" in the creek was used by early inhabitants of Bel Air for bathing.

=== Exterior architecture ===
Remarkably well preserved for its age, Bel Air is pre-Georgian brick house on a raised stone basement. The house measures 38 × 51 feet. It contains elements of Tidewater architecture while using a center plan typical of later Georgian period homes. It appears to be a transitional house between the southern colonial and the Georgian styles or a vernacular attempt to imitate one or the other or combine elements that Charles Ewell desired. The current front entrance faces northwest, but the southeast entrance was the original approach to the house. The house is oriented at exactly 45 degrees from the cardinal points, ensuring year-round sunlight on each side of the house.

==== Façade ====
The overall facade is simple yet graceful in its appearance with a dogleg staircase leading to an entrance stoop at the main level. Like other houses from the period, Bel Air has a double front. In a style that was prevalent before 1700, the main entrance is unbalanced, with two windows to the left and one to the right. Despite this asymmetrical design, the façade does not appear either awkward or unbalanced to the eye. The wooden double-leafed main door has a simple beaded trim surround and a rectangular transom above with two rows of six panes over each other. A simple jack arch supports the brick above. The northwest side of the home is symmetrical, five-bays wide, and has a square-shaped opening approach. Although replacements, the windows are of the narrow 18th century type, with double hung, wooden sashes and nine-over-nine panes. They are painted white with wooden non projecting sills below and brick jack arches above.

The bricks, which were imported from Scotland as ship ballast around 1740, are laid for the most part in Flemish bond, although it lapses at times on the northwest side into five-course American bond, where considerable rebuilding is obvious. Repointing with historically accurate lime-based putty began in 2015 and is ongoing to repair mortar joints and fix prior repairs that improperly used Portland cement. The southeast façade has four bays with two of the windows to the left and one to the right of the door.

==== Basement ====
The elevated basement is almost completely above ground and has windows that are directly under those of the main floor above. The basement walls range in thickness from 1 to 3 feet and are constructed of rough fieldstones believed to have been excavated from the nearby fields. The basement windows are double hung-wooden sash with six-over-six panes. The water table which starts the brick construction contains relieving arches above the window openings. The water table is laid in English bond and separates the stone foundation below and the brick work of the first level above. It is unclear whether the water table is original or a later addition, but it is entirely mortared together with Portland cement, and not historically accurate lime based putty that is found in the brickwork above. Buttresses were added to the northeastern side in the 1950s.

==== Chimneys ====
The house has one interior and one exterior chimney. The enormous 22-foot-wide exterior chimney is double pented and has a somewhat larger cap. The cap and upper portion of the chimney was reconstructed in the 1990s. The interior chimney is engaged into the roof at the gable end.

==== Roof ====
The gable roof was originally made of clay tile fastened in one corner by a three-cornered peg. Thinking that the weight of the clay tile was buckling the exterior walls and causing the northeastern side of the house to subside, owners of Bel Air in the early 19th century replaced the tile with cedar shingles, which were later replaced with asphalt shingles in the early 20th century and then asbestos tile in the 1950s. This was a mistake, as the cause of the sinking was defective foundation walls, not the weight of the roof. The subsidence was finally corrected with the addition of buttresses to the northeastern side of the building in the 1950s and repairs to the roof trusses and other structural repairs in the 1990s. All of these repairs made possible the installation of a period-correct slate roof in 2016. The cornice below the slightly projecting eave is plain and unadorned with painted wood molding. As the brick gutters run on the ground, roof gutters are unnecessary and copper gutters span the entrances only. On each side of the roof are three small and evenly-spaced pedimented gable-roofed dormers, sided with beaded clapboards, and containing a double hung-wooden sash window with four-over-four panes. Dormers on the northwestern side of the home were repaired in 2016.

=== Interior architecture ===
Bel Air is a 1 1/2-story central-passage house with a walk-out basement. With the finished basement, it contains 4375 sq. ft. of living space. There are currently five bedrooms, three bathrooms, and eight fireplaces. Two stairways connect the basement to the main floor, including a steep servant stairs from the kitchen to the reception room (now an office). Typical for the period, an open, wide staircase with two commodious landings connects the main to the upper floor. Also consistent with 18th century fashion, the guestroom is on the main floor to provide privacy.

==== Ground floor ====
The cooking, dining and laundry work were all provided for on the six-room, brick-floored, stone-walled, walk-out English basement. The large dining hall was called the "wool room" by the Ewells, who used it as their prime living space until it was converted for more menial uses when the upper floors of the mansion were finished. This room contains a massive fireplace, the stone hearth and brick floor of which are original. In the room there used to be a window, low but wide enough across to roll in great pine logs, just as they came from the wagon, and a fireplace big enough to accommodate them. The brick floor in the room is an exact replica. Connected via a butler pantry is the kitchen, which contains its own fireplace for cooking, although modern appliances have been added to accommodate contemporary living. Connected to the kitchen is a laundry room, but the iron shackles that were found imbedded in the wall point to the original use of the room—a dungeon for quarrelsome Indians and disobedient slaves. During the 1885 restoration, a window and second door were added to the room, and it was converted into a root cellar.

==== Main floor ====
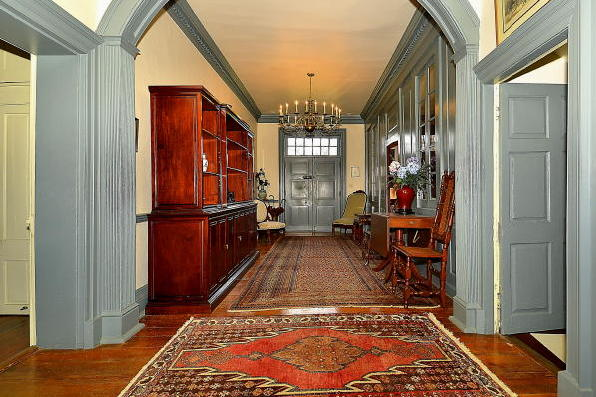
Bel Air Central Hallway

Like the main floor plan of nearly every other colonial-era manor home near the Potomac—including Belvoir, Gunston Hall, and Mount Vernon before George Washington added to it—Bel Air contains a wide central passage flanked by two rooms on either side. The stately main floor—with 11-foot ceilings, wide pine-plank floors, and large central hall adorned by Greek key cornices and reeded archway—was designed for entertaining. Noted for its intricate woodwork, the drawing room, sometimes called the "state dining room," "red room" or parlor, contains large deep-welled windows, 18th century paneling, and Greek key cornices with troy motif. The room is dominated by an architectural fireplace with an extremely fine mantel and overmantel with dog-ear motif supported by consoles. Above the mantel is a copy of Grant Wood's painting of Parson Weems' tale of the cherry tree.

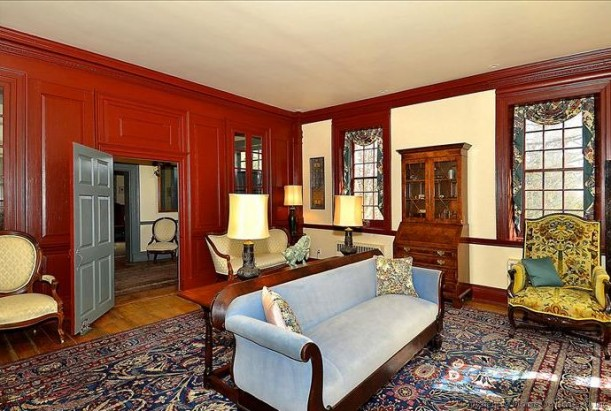
Bel Air Drawing Room. The paneled partition can be removed to join the room with the central hall.

Perhaps the most notable feature in the house is a wooden partition that can be removed (by taking out the baseboard and kicking the panels out on dowels) to join the drawing room and the central hall into a 20 x 30 foot room for great occasions. The partition is fully paneled on both sides, both above and below the chair rail. Complete with a 10-pane casement window on either side of the partition door, the design is extraordinary.

Connected to the drawing room by a door with a 12-pane transom above is the Washington guest chamber, where George and Martha Washington and other guests would have spent the night. In the absence of guests, however, the room was used as Jesse and Charlotte Ewell's bedroom and was referred to as "Ole Miss's" or "Ole Marstar's" room.

Directly across the hall from the drawing room is the formal dining room, beautifully ornamented with dentil moldings, built-in shelves, dumbwaiter and large fireplace. At the northwest corner of the house is the reception room (sometimes used as the family dining room or office), which was nearly destroyed by a fire in 1840. The room has since been altered to make room for a bathroom and closet.

==== Top floor ====
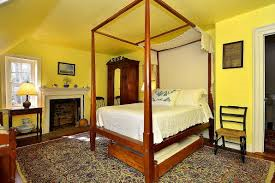
An Upstairs Bedroom

The top floor originally contained five bedrooms, with fireplaces in four of them. During the 1949 restoration, the fifth bedroom was converted into two bathrooms and closets, and its fireplace was removed. The small bedroom above the stairs was Parson Weems' study; it is said that he selected the remotest room as his own in order to secure sanctuary from his mother-in-law. A full-length attic spans the building.
