= Occoquan Historic District =

Historic district in Virginia, United States

- U.S. National Register of Historic Places
- U.S. Historic district
- Virginia Landmarks Register
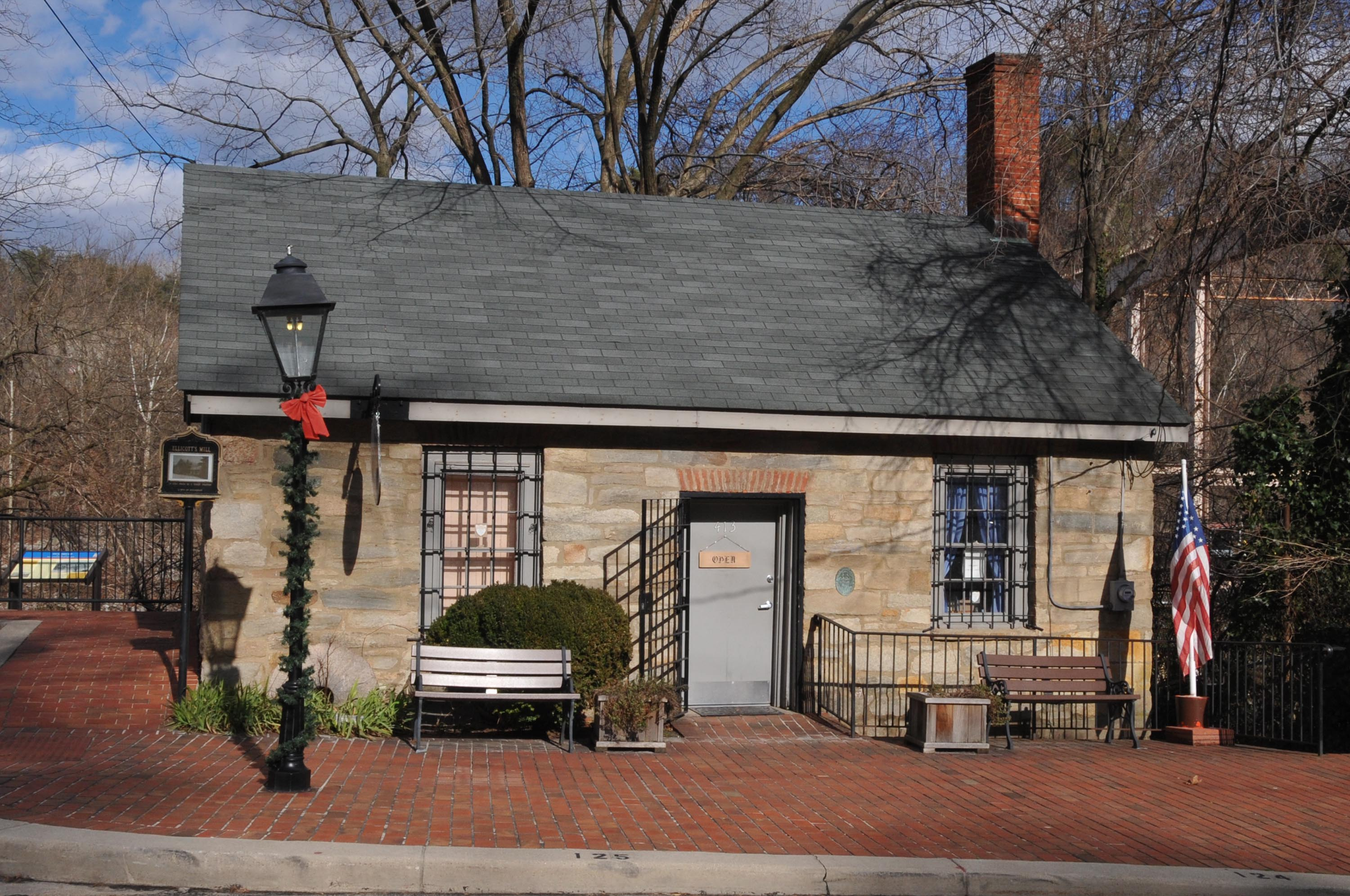
- Ellicott's Mill House in the Occoquan Historic District, January 2013

- Location within Northern Virginia Location within Virginia Location within the United States
- Location: Roughly bounded by the Occoquan River, Center Lane, Washington St. and western end of Mill St., Occoquan, Virginia
- Coordinates: 38°41′03″N 77°15′38″W
- Area: 13.3 acres (5.4 ha)
- Architectural style: Colonial Revival, Federal
- NRHP reference No.: 83004255
- VLR No.: 272-0012

Significant dates
- Added to NRHP: October 6, 1983
- Designated VLR: August 16, 1983

Occoquan Historic District is a national historic district located at Occoquan, Prince William County, Virginia. It encompasses 60 contributing buildings in the town of Occoquan. The buildings are predominantly frame, two-story, residential structures although the earliest examples are constructed of stone or brick. The Ellicott's Mill House (c. 1760) houses Historic Occoquan, Inc. The district also includes several notable non-residential buildings including the Hammill Hotel (c. 1830), Ebenezer Church (1853), Methodist Church (1926), and Crescent Lodge #3 (1889). Located in the district is the separately listed Rockledge.

It was added to the National Register of Historic Places in 1983.

== Gallery ==
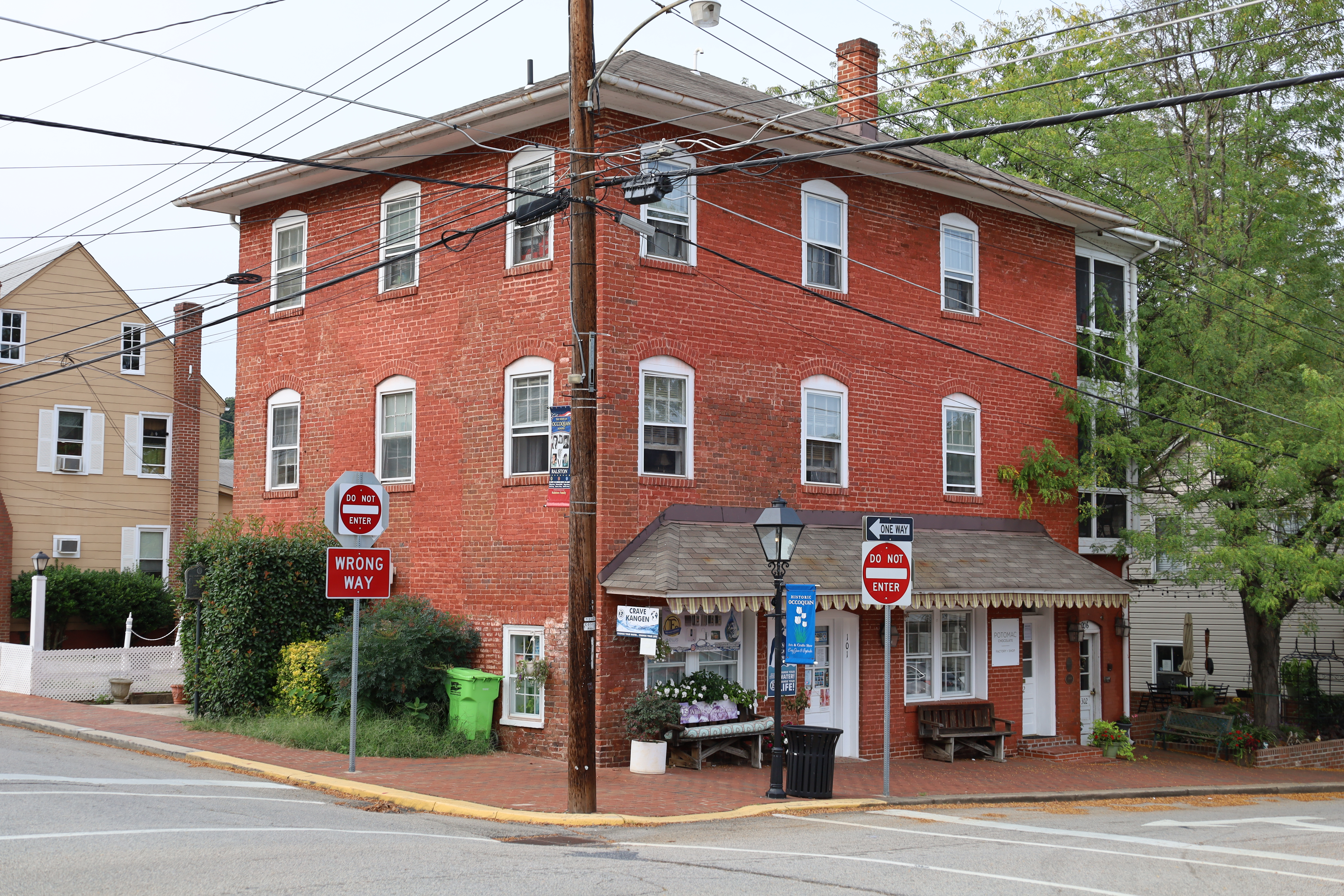
Hammill Hotel

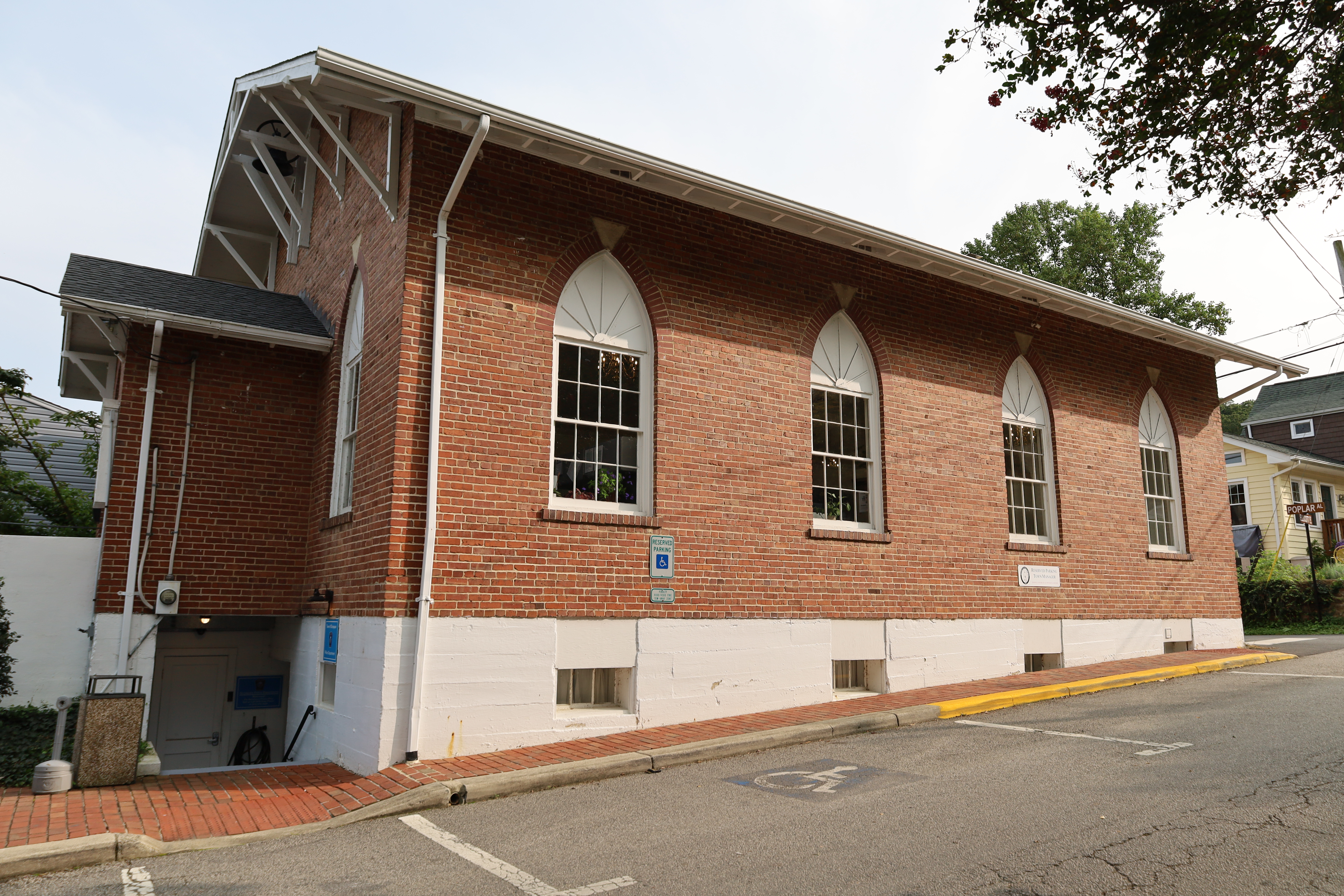
Occoquan Town Hall

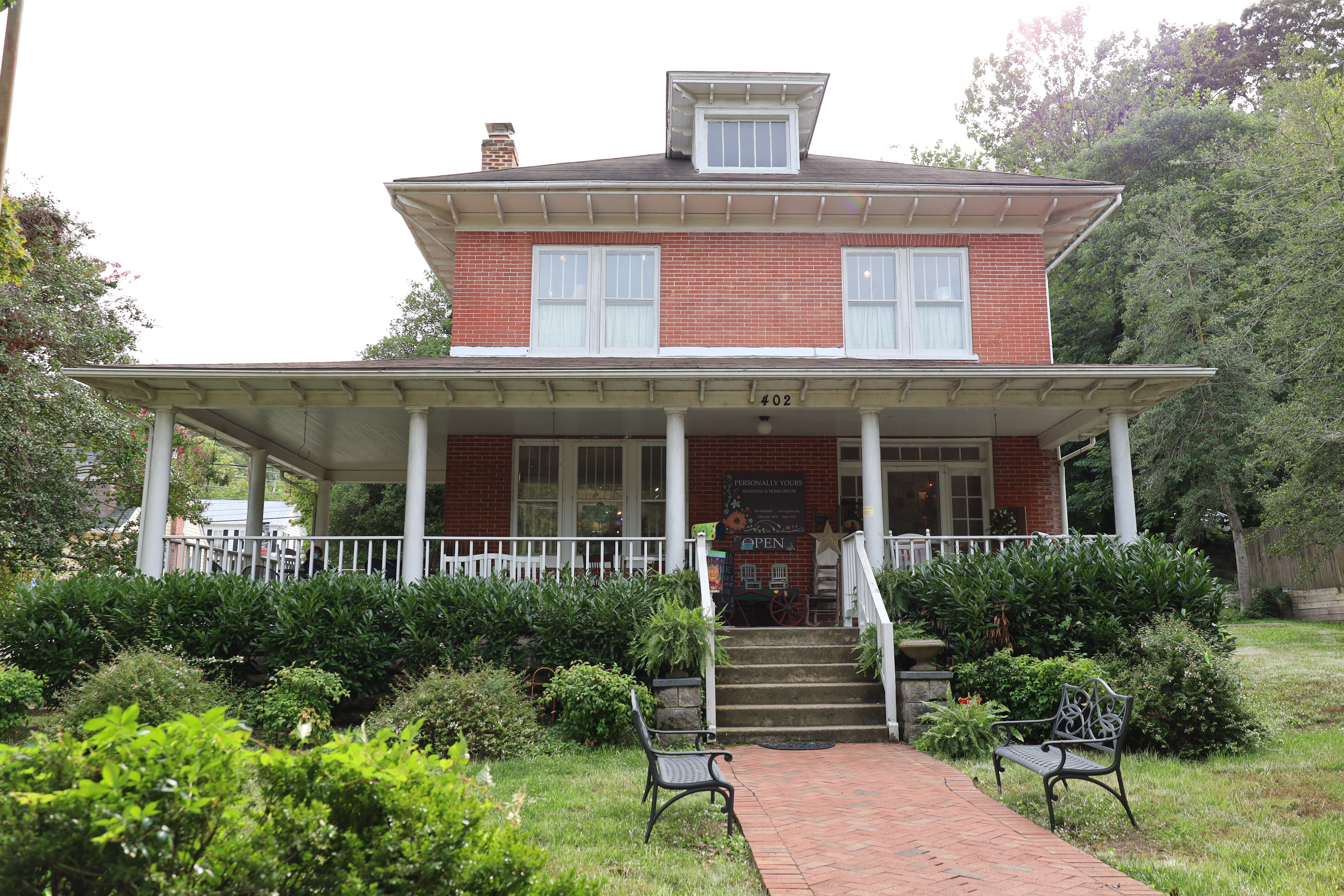
A house in Occoquan Historic District
