= Minnieville, Virginia =

- Extinct unincorporated community
- Location within the state of Virginia Minnieville, Virginia (Virginia) Minnieville, Virginia (the United States)
- Coordinates: 38°38′9″N 77°21′8″W
- Country: United States
- State: Virginia
- County: Prince William
- Time zone: UTC−5 (Eastern (EST))
  - Summer (DST): UTC−4 (EDT)

Minnieville is an extinct unincorporated community that was once located in Prince William County, Virginia, United States. The Minnieville post office stood at the corner of what is now known as Minnieville Road and Cardinal Drive from 1884 to 1924. The town was surrounded by large dairy farms, but subsequent suburban encroachment from the communities of Dale City and Montclair have since subsumed these farms into subdivision developments.

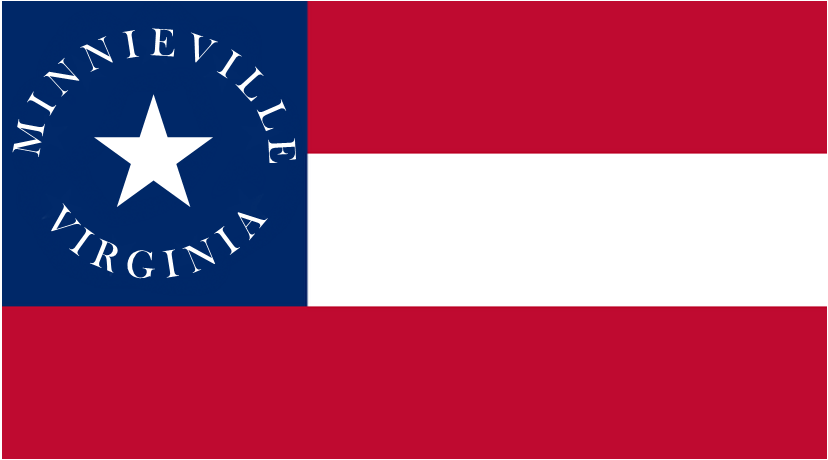
Unofficial flag of Minnieville, Virginia, based on the flag of the 3rd Brigade, Confederate Army of the Shenandoah, which was quartered in Minnieville in 1861.

Bel Air Plantation was the prominent feature here prior to the early 19th century, when large dairy farms began to flourish nearby. The plantation was located on the North side of Minnieville Road between Cardinal Drive and Spriggs Road. The main house was built about 1740. Parson Mason Locke Weems, the first biographer of George Washington is buried on the property. Bel Air Plantation was listed on the National Register of Historic Places in 1970.

Though there are many residents of the subdivisions now located on land that once was recognized as being part of the town of Minnieville, the name itself is no longer used to identify this area, hence the designation of "extinct". A roadside marker is the only remnant.

== See also ==
- Former counties, cities, and towns of Virginia
