= Marumsco, Virginia =

- Former CDP
- Location in Prince William County and the state of Virginia.
- Coordinates: 38°38′17″N 77°15′32″W
- Country: United States
- State: Virginia
- County: Prince William

Population (2013 est.)
  - Total: 37,218
  - Density: 5,015/sq mi (1,936/km^{2})
- Time zone: UTC−5 (Eastern (EST))
  - Summer (DST): UTC−4 (EDT)
- ZIP codes: 22191
- FIPS code: 51-49792
- GNIS feature ID: 2629767

Marumsco was a census-designated place in Prince William County, Virginia. The population was estimated at 37,218 in 2013. The CDP consisted of the major portion of what was the Woodbridge CDP up to 2000, including the subdivisions of Marumsco Village, Marumsco Hills, Marumsco Acres and Marumsco Woods. The area was merged back into Woodbridge prior to the 2020 census, at which time the full Woodbridge CDP had a population of 44,668. The name "Marumsco" comes from an Algonquin word meaning "island rock." The area is part of a region historically known as "Linton Neck".

== Background ==
Historical population
Census	Pop.	Note	%±
U.S. Decennial Census; 2010

The U.S. Census Bureau designated Marumsco as separate from Woodbridge in 2010. Almost 90 percent of residents who lived in Woodbridge in 2000, along with 80 percent of the land, became part of Marumsco. The area was re-designated part of Woodbridge again prior to the 2020 census.

With a population of about 37,000 residents and a density of about 5,000 residents per square mile, the Marumsco CDP covered a large portion of U.S. Route 1 in Prince William County. The area experiences high traffic volumes consisting of residents and commuters going north typically to Fairfax County as well as the D.C. metropolitan area. The Marumsco CDP extended on both sides of Route 1 from Occoquan Road in the north to Optiz Boulevard in the south. Further south, the CDP continued on the east side of Route 1 as far as Rippon Boulevard. The entire area as of 2020 is once again part of the Woodbridge CDP.
