= William Buckland (architect) =

American architect (1734-1774)

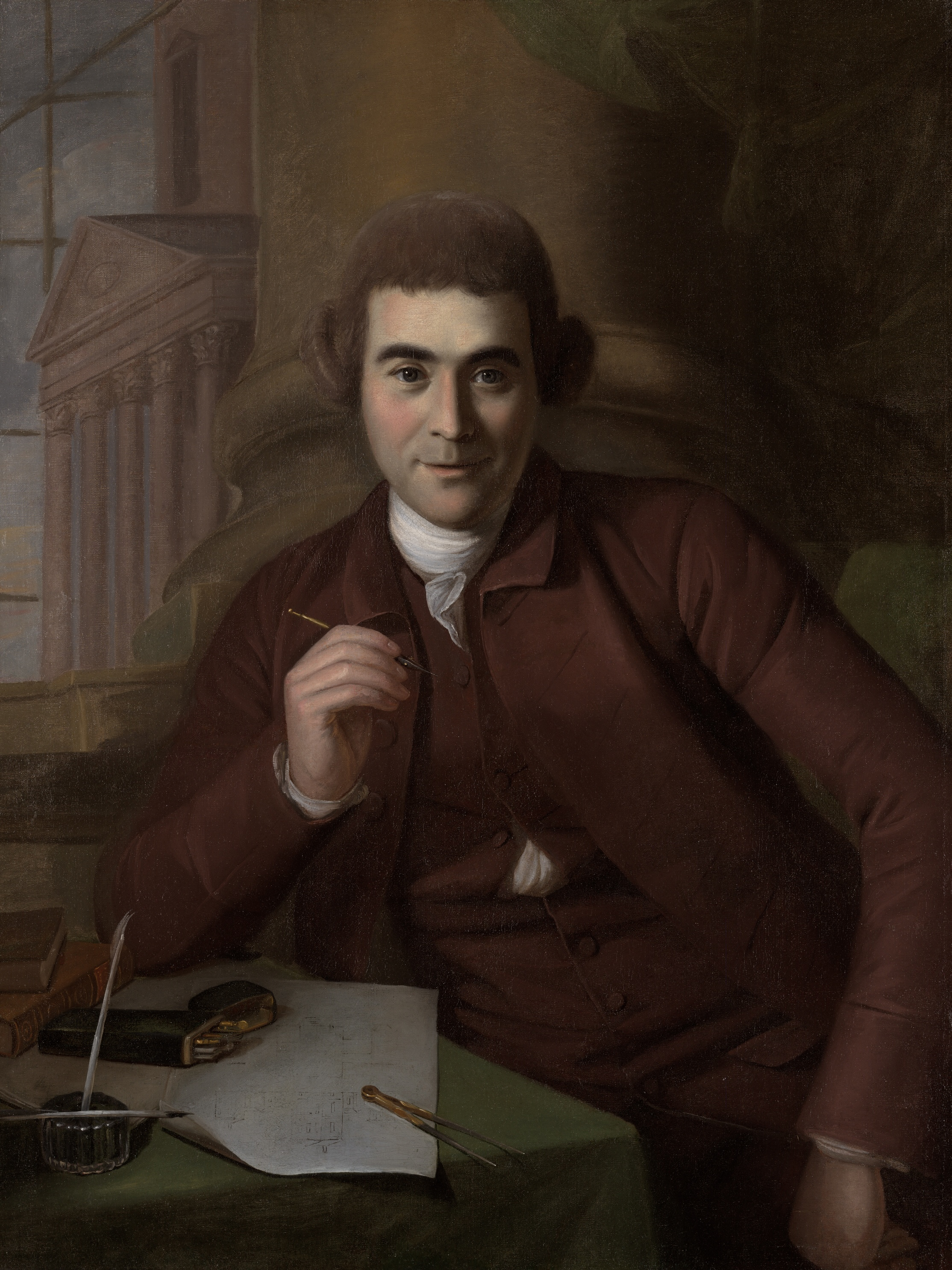
- Posthumous portrait by Charles Willson Peale, c. 1789
- Born: August 14, 1734; Oxford, England
- Died: 1774 (about 40 years old)
- Occupation: Architect
- Notable work: Gunston Hall; Hammond-Harwood House
- Spouse: Mary Moore
- Children: 4

William Buckland (1734–1774) was a British architect who designed several important buildings in colonial Maryland and Virginia.

== Biography ==
Born at Oxford, England, Buckland spent seven years as an apprentice to his uncle, James Buckland, "Citizen and Joiner" of London. At 21, he was brought to Virginia as an indentured servant to Thomson Mason, brother of George Mason. Most notable among his repertoire are: Gunston Hall (c. 1755–1759) and Hammond-Harwood House (c. 1774).

Buckland married Mary Moore, the daughter of plantation owner William Moore, around 1758 or 1759. The two had four children, two boys and two girls.

== Works ==
He is known to have worked on the architecture or interiors of:

- Gunston Hall, Fairfax County, Virginia. Patron: George Mason (interiors, c. 1755–59); 10709 Gunston Rd. Mason Neck, VA Buckland, William, NRHP-listed
- Courthouse, Prince William County, Virginia (no longer extant, 1759–61)
- Mount Airy, Richmond County, Virginia. Patron: Colonel John Tayloe II (interiors, no longer extant, 1761–64)
- Hynson-Ringgold House, Chestertown, Maryland (interiors, 1771)
- Chase-Lloyd House, Annapolis, Maryland. Patron: Edward Lloyd IV (interiors, 1771–1773); 22 Maryland Ave. Annapolis, MD Buckland, William, NRHP-listed
- Hammond-Harwood House, Maryland Ave. and King George St. Annapolis, MD Buckland, William, NRHP-listed

Other works sometimes attributed to Buckland include:

- Brice House, Annapolis, Maryland (interiors), NRHP-listed
- Menokin, Warsaw, Virginia
- Whitehall, Anne Arundel County, Maryland salon interior
- William Paca House, Annapolis, Maryland (interiors)
- Rockledge, Telegraph Rd. Occoquan, VA Buckland, William, NRHP-listed
