= Occoquan, Virginia =

- Town
- Town of Occoquan
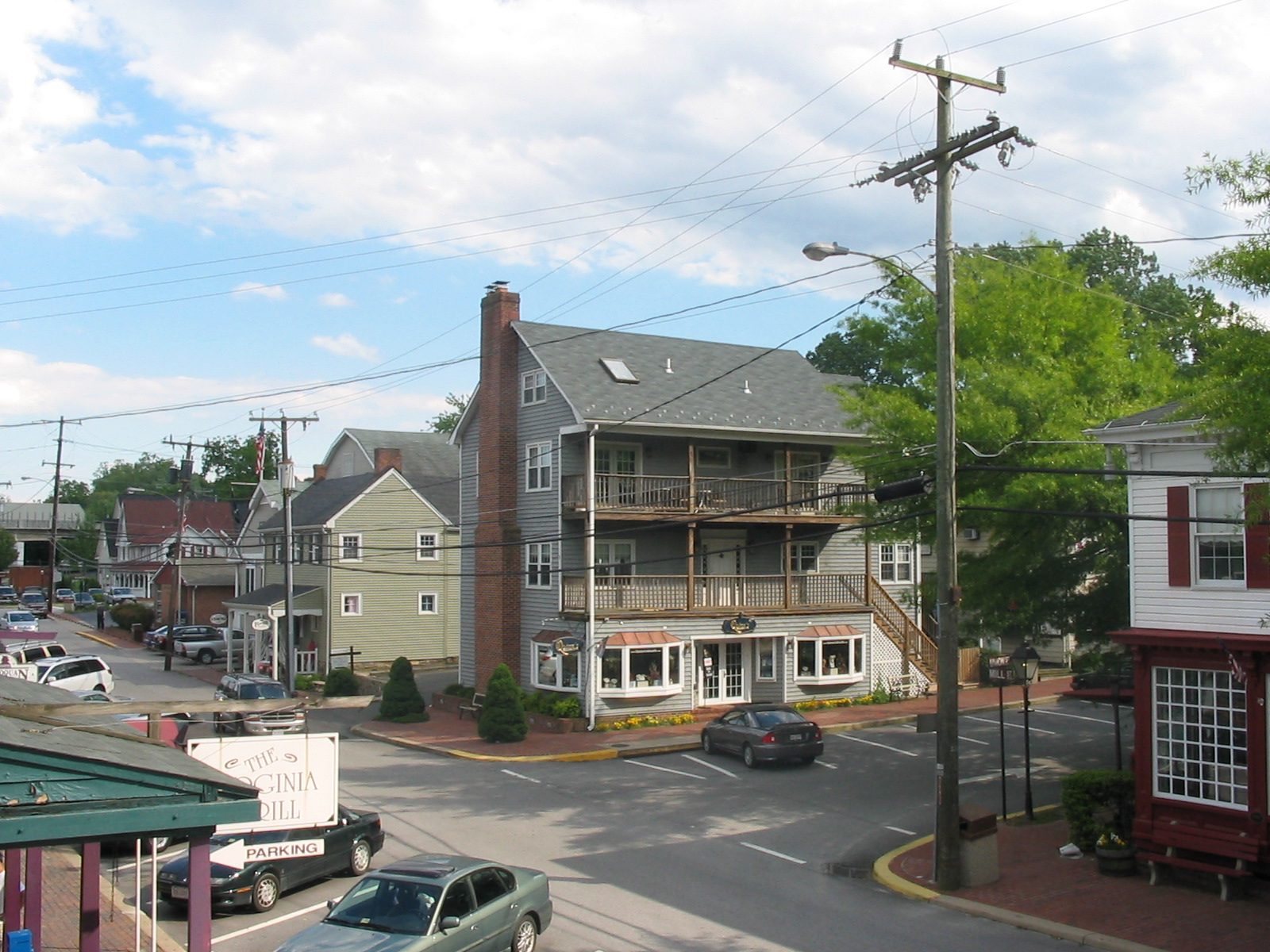
- Mill Street, the center of Occoquan's historic and commercial district

- Location in Prince William County and the state of Virginia.
- Coordinates: 38°40′58″N 77°15′39″W
- Country: United States
- State: Virginia
- County: Prince William

Area
  - Total: 0.22 sq mi (0.57 km^{2})
  - Land: 0.17 sq mi (0.45 km^{2})
  - Water: 0.046 sq mi (0.12 km^{2})
- Elevation: 7 ft (2.1 m)

Population (2020)
  - Total: 1,035
  - Estimate (2019): 1,086
  - Density: 6,277.3/sq mi (2,423.69/km^{2})
- Time zone: UTC−5 (Eastern (EST))
  - Summer (DST): UTC−4 (EDT)
- ZIP code: 22125
- Area codes: 703, 571
- FIPS code: 51-58696
- GNIS feature ID: 1497059
- Website: http://www.occoquanva.gov/

Occoquan (/ˈɒkəkwɒn/) is a town in eastern Prince William County, Virginia, United States, founded in 1804. As of the 2020 census, Occoquan had a population of 1,035. The current mayor is Earnest W. Porta Jr. Today, the town is a restored artists' community, with shops, outdoor dining, ghost walks, and a town boat dock, as well as historic buildings dating back to the 19th century.

== History ==
Occoquan is derived from an Algonquian Doeg Indian word, meaning "at the end of the water". Located on the Occoquan River, Occoquan was long a site of indigenous peoples' habitation. Like the British colonists after them, they relied on the river for transportation and trade, as well as fish. Early in the 1600s Capt. John Smith sailed and explored the Occoquan River. In 1608, when the first European reached Northern Virginia, the Tauxenent tribe (also known by the English as the "Dogues") had its main village at the mouth of the Occoquan River. This tribe was more closely associated with neighbors such as the Piscataways (located across the Potomac River in what is now Maryland) than the other Algonquian-speaking tribes to the south. The local chief was called a Tayac, who was subservient to an "emperor" located in Prince George's County.

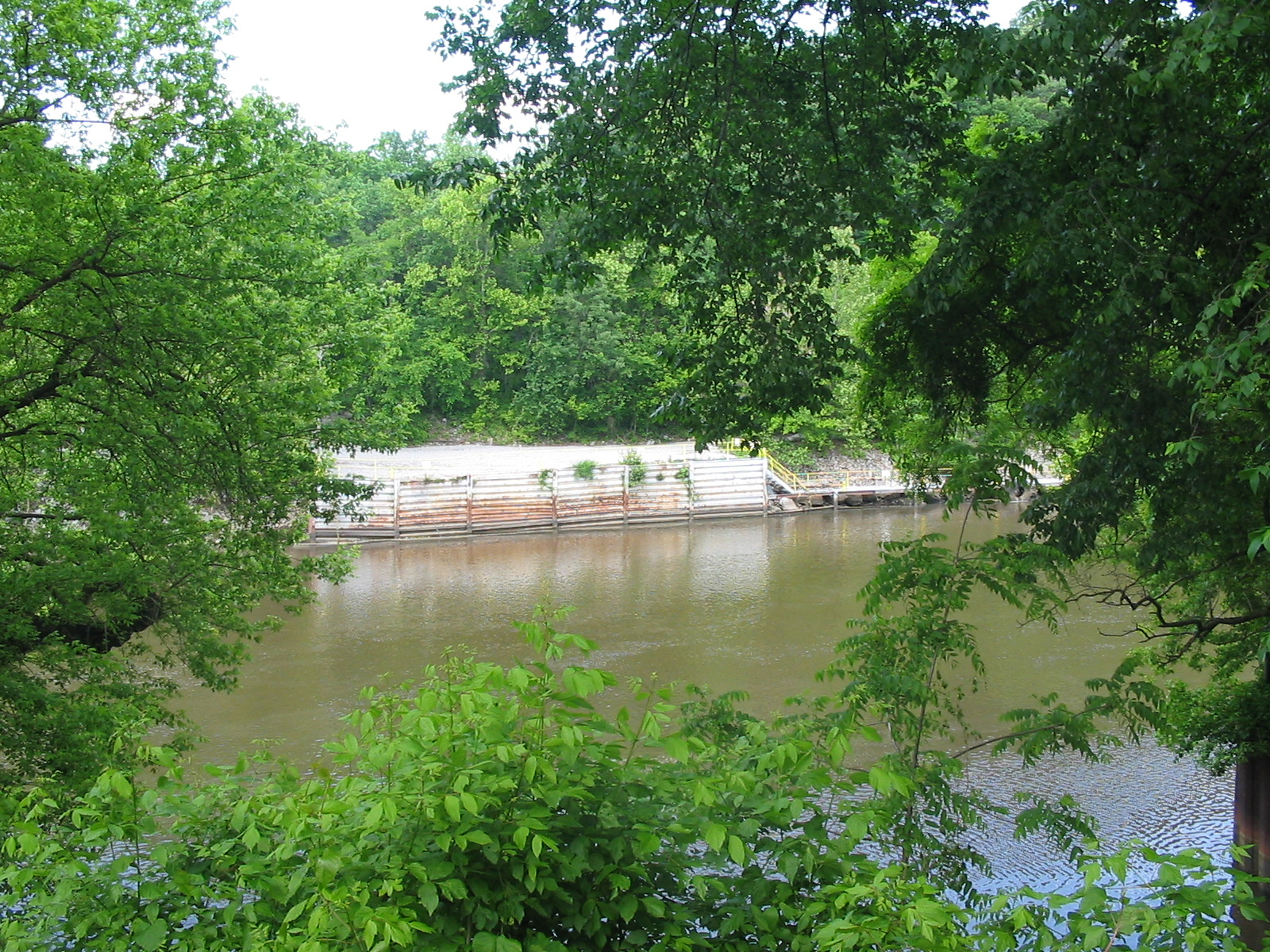
The Occoquan River as it passes the town

By 1765, Anglo-American colonists had established an industrial settlement at Occoquan, with grist mills and tobacco warehouses. The Merchants Mill established by Quaker Nathaniel Ellicot may have been the first automated grist mill in the nation. It operated for 175 years until destroyed by fire.

During the Civil War, the post office passed letters and packages between North and South. River silting reduced ship traffic to Occoquan and ended its days as a port, as did the shift in traffic to railroads.

== Local attractions ==
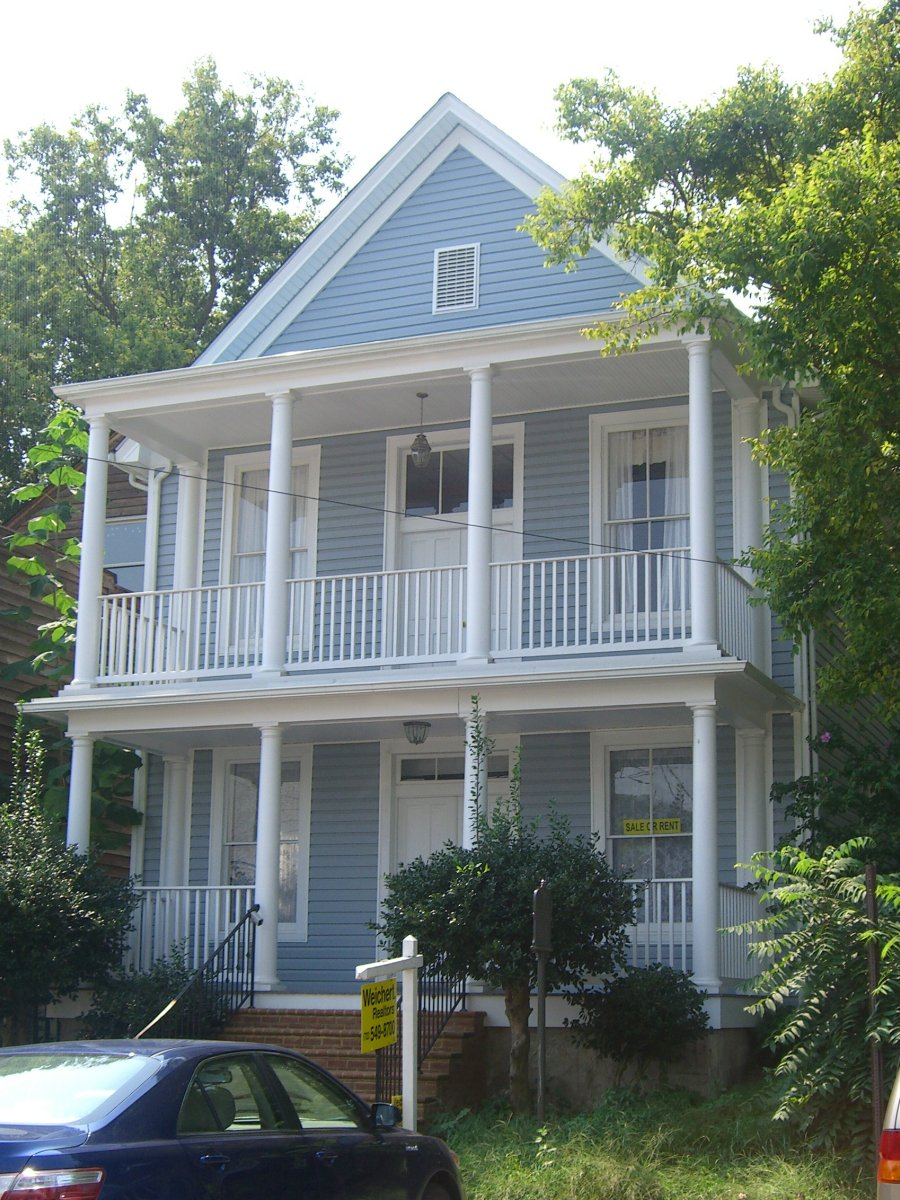
Odd Fellows Hall, 2007

A number of structures in town, including many in the downtown commercial area, are part of the Occoquan Historic District listed on the National Register of Historic Places (NRHP). Rockledge, the former house of the town's founder, is also listed as a significant structure on the NRHP.

Historic houses in Occoquan include a 17th-century house at 206 Mill Street and Rockledge Manor, a Georgian mansion built in 1758 by John Ballandine and British architect William Buckland. Two hotels in the town date back to the early 1800s: the Hamill Hotel built in 1804 and the Occoquan Inn built in 1810. The oldest brick structure in Occoquan, the Hamill Hotel once housed Confederate troops under General Wade Hampton.

The Mill House Museum in Occoquan is operated daily except Wednesdays by the Occoquan Historical Society. The Odd Fellows Hall on 308 Commerce Street dates back to 1889 but was renovated to add an upstairs porch.

== Geography ==
Occoquan is located at 38°40′58″N 77°15′39″W (38.682916, −77.260830) on the north side of the peninsula known as Linton Neck.

According to the United States Census Bureau, the town has a total area of 0.2 square mile (0.5 km^{2}) of which 0.2 square mile (0.4 km^{2}) is land and 0.04 square mile (0.1 km^{2}) (15.79%) is water.

Occoquan lies on the south bank of the Occoquan River at the Fall Line.

== Demographics ==
Historical population
Census	Pop.	Note	%±
1860	273		—
1870	228		−16.5%
1880	306		34.2%
1890	297		−2.9%
1900	297		0.0%
1910	246		−17.2%
1920	231		−6.1%
1930	221		−4.3%
1940	213		−3.6%
1950	317		48.8%
1960	301		−5.0%
1970	975		223.9%
1980	241		−75.3%
1990	361		49.8%
2000	759		110.2%
2010	934		23.1%
2020	1,035		10.8%
U.S. Decennial Census

As of the census of 2000, there were 759 people, 418 households, and 186 families living in the town. The population density was 4,868.7 people per square mile (1,831.6/km^{2}). There were 443 housing units at an average density of 2,841.7 per square mile (1,069.0/km^{2}). The racial makeup of the town was 85.51% White, 8.17% Black, 0.53% Native American, 1.58% Asian, 0.13% Pacific Islander, 1.58% from other races, and 2.50% from two or more races. Hispanic or Latino of any race were 6.46% of the population.

There were 418 households, out of which 11.5% had children under the age of 18 living with them, 35.6% were married couples living together, 6.2% had a female householder with no husband present, and 55.3% were non-families. 45.9% of all households were made up of individuals, and 8.1% had someone living alone who was 65 years of age or older. The average household size was 1.82 and the average family size was 2.54.

In the town, the population was spread out, with 11.1% under the age of 18, 8.0% from 18 to 24, 36.2% from 25 to 44, 33.6% from 45 to 64, and 11.1% who were 65 years of age or older. The median age was 42 years. For every 100 females, there were 88.8 males. For every 100 females aged 18 and over, there were 92.3 males.

The median income for a household in the town was $48,750, and the median income for a family was $77,420. Males had a median income of $50,938 versus $30,833 for females. The per capita income for the town was $33,007. None of the families and 5.7% of the population were living below the poverty line, including no under eighteens and 14.9% of those over 64.

As of the census of 2010, there were 934 people living in the town of Occoquan.

== Transportation ==
Primary access to Occoquan is provided via Virginia State Route 123, which runs north to Interstate 66 and south to Interstate 95. Additional local roads provide access to neighboring portions of unincorporated Prince William County.
