= Weems–Botts Museum =

Historic house in Virginia, United States

- Weems–Botts House
- U.S. National Register of Historic Places
- Virginia Landmarks Register
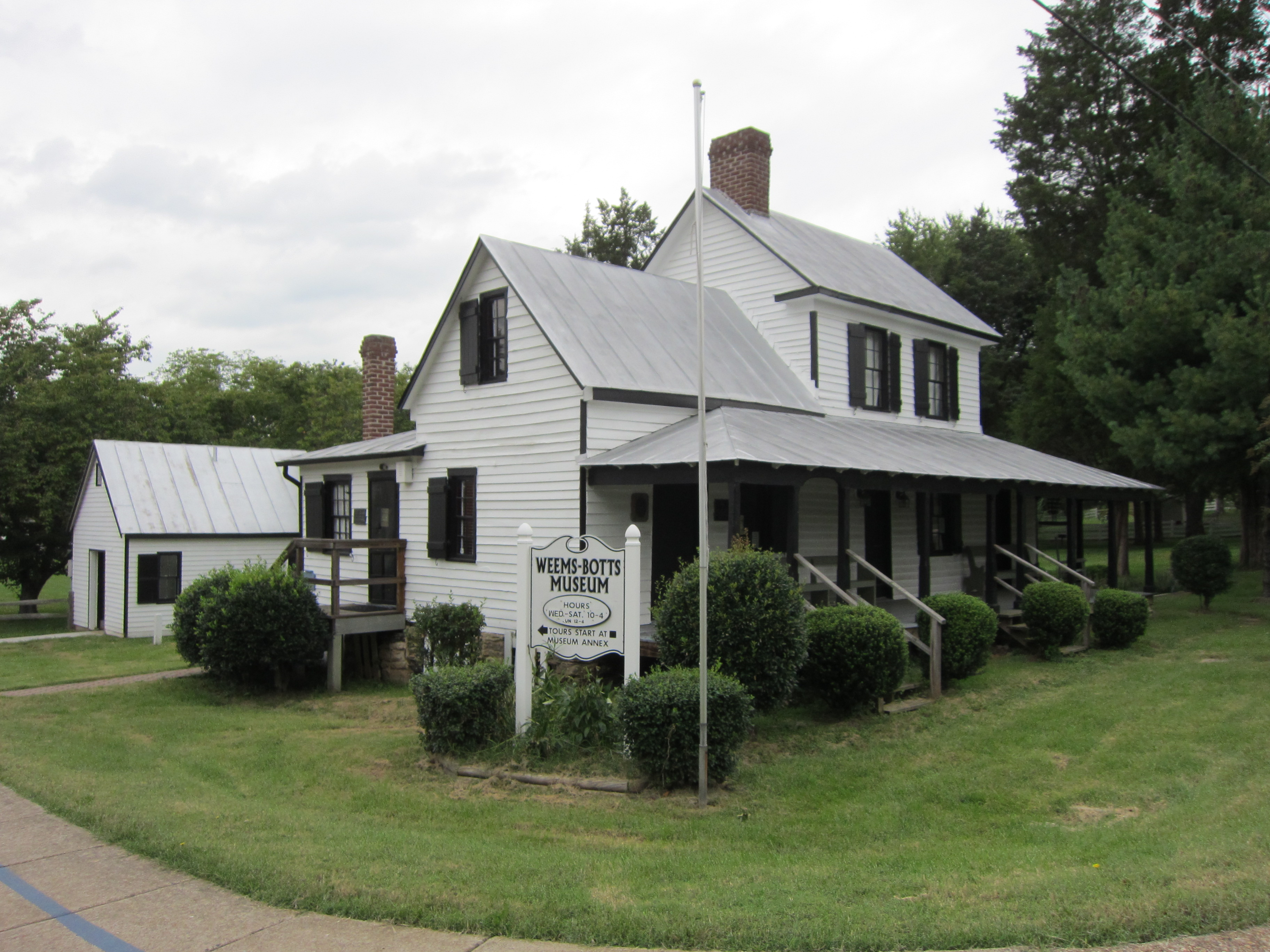
- Weems-Botts House

- Location within Northern Virginia Location within Virginia Location within the United States
- Location: Corner of Duke Street and Cameron Street; Dumfries, Virginia
- Coordinates: 38°34′07″N 77°19′49″W
- Area: 1.6 acres (0.65 ha)
- NRHP reference No.: 75002029
- VLR No.: 212-0010

Significant dates
- Added to NRHP: May 12, 1975
- Designated VLR: April 15, 1975

Weems–Botts House Museum is a small historic museum in Dumfries, Virginia, United States. The museum includes the landmark Weems–Botts House on the corner of Duke Street and Cameron Street and the Weems–Botts Museum Annex, which houses the Lee Lansing Research Library and Archive, located at 3944 Cameron Street. Both buildings are located in Merchant Park. The park's bandstand commemorates William Grayson, one of Prince William County's most respected citizens and one of Virginia's first senators. The museum tour showcases the history of Dumfries, Virginia's oldest chartered town, and people associated with the house, including Mason Locke "Parson" Weems, and attorney Benjamin Botts.

The museum was restored in 1975 as part of a bicentennial U.S. restoration project. The museum is owned by the Town of Dumfries and operated by Historic Dumfries Virginia, Inc., a non-profit organization.

== Historical significance ==
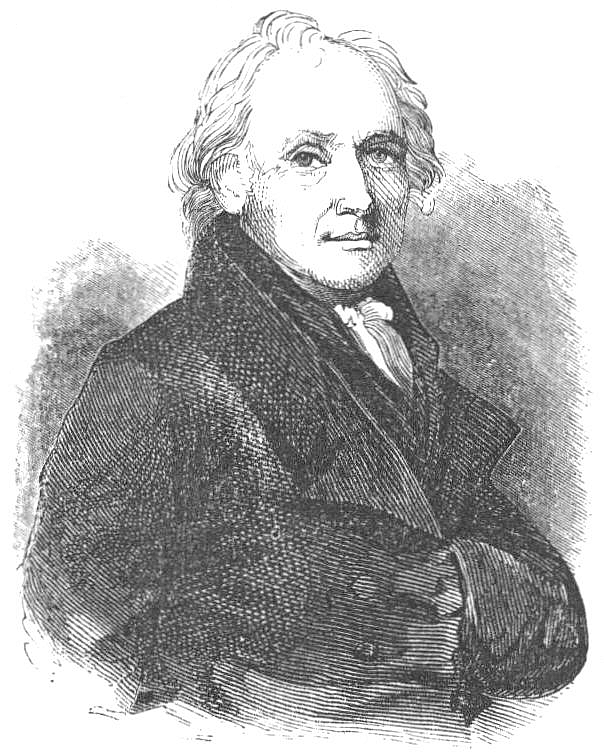
Parson Weems (1759-1825) was the first biographer of George Washington and the creator of the cherry tree story.

The house originally served as the vestry for the Quantico Church.

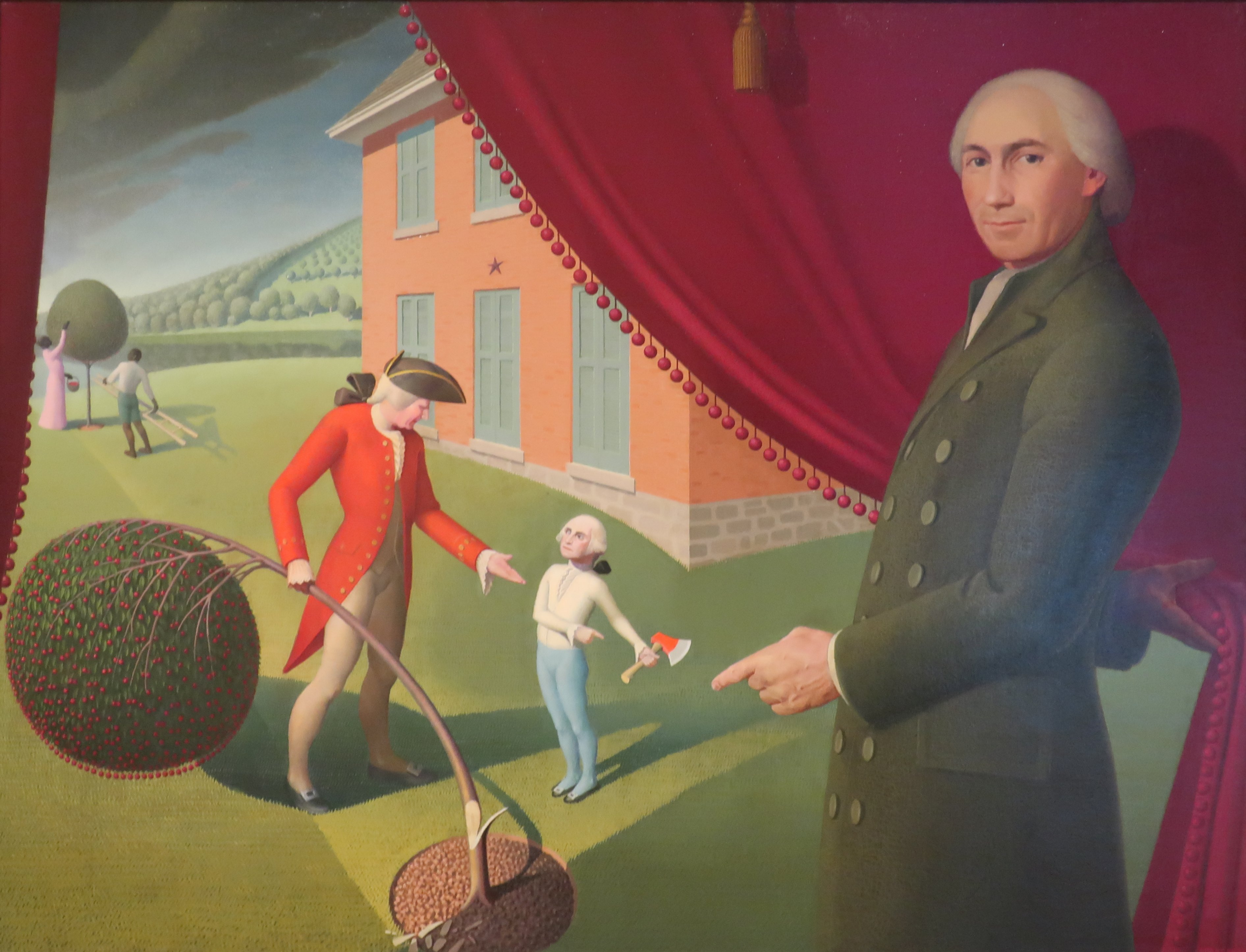
'Parson Weems' Fable', a 1939 painting by Grant Wood, depicting both Weems and his famous "Cherry Tree" story.

The house was purchased by Parson Weems, a native Marylander, in 1798. Weems was a clergyman who became an author and purveyor of books, which he would sell from the back of his jersey wagon. While traveling through Dumfries during one of his book-selling tours, Weems met Fanny Ewell, the daughter of Colonel Jesse Ewell, a wealthy tobacco planter with a warehouse business in Dumfries. They married in 1795.

During his ownership of the house, Weems wrote an 80-page booklet that would influence the thoughts of Americans to this day entitled A History of the Life and Death, Virtues and Exploits of General George Washington. Weems published the first biography on George Washington and was the creator of the famous cherry tree story ("I cannot tell a lie, I did it with my little hatchet"). Weems also created the fable that Washington threw a silver dollar more than 300 feet across the Rappahannock River. He also wrote biographies on Benjamin Franklin, Francis Marion, and William Penn. Sometime after the death of his father-in-law in 1805, Weems moved his family into the Ewell family estate, Bel Air.

Weems sold his shop in 1802 to an attorney named Benjamin Botts. Benjamin Botts used the building as his law office. Best remembered as one of the defense attorneys who successfully defended Aaron Burr during his infamous treason and conspiracy trial, Botts was a Dumfries native and rising star in Virginia's legal community. Botts was killed in the Richmond Theater fire on December 26, 1811.

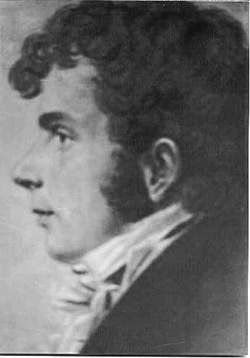
Benjamin Botts (1776-1811) was an attorney best known for representing Aaron Burr during his infamous treason and conspiracy trial.

After passing through multiple ownerships, the Merchant family owned and lived in the house from 1869 to 1968. The property was restored and opened as a museum in 1975.
