= Mason Locke Weems =

Biographer of George Washington (1759–1825)

Parson Weems
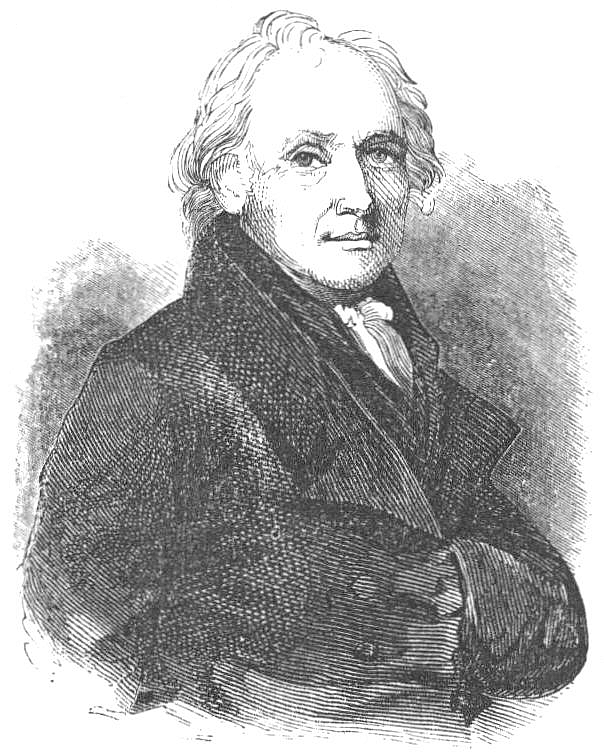
- Born: October 11, 1759; Anne Arundel County, Maryland, Province of Maryland, British America
- Died: April 23, 1825 (aged 65); Beaufort, South Carolina, U.S.
- Resting place: Bel-Air
- Other name: Mason L. Weems
- Occupations: Book agent and author
- Notable work: The Life of Washington

Mason Locke Weems (October 11, 1759 – May 23, 1825), usually referred to as Parson Weems, was an American minister, evangelical bookseller and author who wrote (and rewrote and republished) the first biography of George Washington immediately after his death. Some popular stories about Washington thought during the 20th century to be apocryphal can be traced to Weems, including the cherry tree tale ("I can't tell a lie, Pa; you know I can't tell a lie. I did cut it with my hatchet."). Weems' biography of Washington was a bestseller that depicted Washington's virtues and was intended to provide morally instructive tales for the youth of the young nation.

== Early life ==
Mason Weems was born on October 11, 1759, in Anne Arundel County, Maryland, the youngest of nineteen children. His family traced its ancestry to Scotland. When he was ten years old, his parents sent him away to study at the Kent County Free School in Chestertown, Maryland (which later became Washington College). During the 1770s, Weems studied medicine in Edinburgh; then, in the 1780s, after a religious conversion, he studied theology in London.

== Minister and traveling bookseller ==
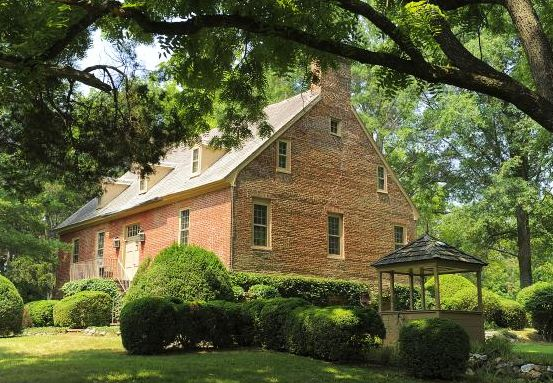
Bel Air Plantation, where Weems and his family moved upon the death of his father-in-law, Col. Jesse Ewell, in 1805

Returning to the new United States, and with the help of John Adams and Benjamin Franklin, Weems was ordained in the Episcopal Church. In 1784, he became the rector of All Hallows Parish in his native Anne Arundel County, served as chaplain of a school for girls, and preached to local African Americans. He soon began disseminating prayer books and established a charitable society to relieve widows and orphans. However, his tendencies toward Methodism (whose ministers were itinerant) proved unpopular with his bishop, Thomas John Claggett, so by 1792, Weems resigned as rector and began a traveling ministry, which included selling books on behalf of Mathew Carey, a prominent Philadelphia publisher who had emigrated from Ireland to flee persecution based on his Catholic faith.

In 1795, Weems married Frances Ewell, the daughter of prominent local patriot and planter Jesse Ewell (1734–1805), and established a household in Dumfries, Virginia. He had a small bookstore in Dumfries, which now houses the Weems–Botts Museum, but continued to travel extensively, particularly in the mid-Atlantic states and South, a market previously dominated by British booksellers, selling books and preaching.

Dumfries is not far from Pohick Church, part of Truro Parish, in Lorton, Virginia, where both George Washington and his father, Augustine, worshiped in pre-Revolutionary days. Weems occasionally preached at Pohick Church but later inflated this Washington connection and promoted himself as the former "rector of Mount-Vernon parish". In fact, Washington had provided an invaluable endorsement to what would be Weems's first bestselling pamphlet, condemning partisanship shortly before the former president's death, The Philanthropist: or a Good Twenty-Five Cents Worth of Political Love Powder, for Honest Adamites and Jeffersonists. In 1792 and 1793, Weems received Washington's endorsement of his first publishing venture, a two-volume edition of sermons by Hugh Blair, and would receive other endorsements from later presidents as well as prominent local figures. Furthermore, Weems learned from his interaction with bishop Claggett. When Virginia's evangelically oriented bishop William Meade complained about Weems selling works by confirmed atheist Thomas Paine, Weems responded that he would only sell it together with Richard Watson's reply, An Apology for the Bible.

In 1800, he published A History of the Life and Death, Virtues and Exploits of General George Washington, a popular book in its time that went into many reprints. Other notable works by Weems include Life of General Francis Marion (1805); Life of Benjamin Franklin, with Essays (1817); and Life of William Penn (1819). Weems also wrote several morality pamphlets, including God's Revenge Against Gambling, Against Duelling, and The Drunkard's Looking Glass.

Not long after his father-in-law died in 1805, Weems began managing the Ewell family estate and by 1808 moved his family within Prince William County to the Ewell family mansion, Bel Air. However, he had debts, so in 1808, he sold Carey the copyright to his biography of George Washington for $1000, a sale which he soon regretted. Although Weems continued to travel extensively, Bel Air became his base, where his wife and family lived.

He was an accomplished violinist and took a violin with him on his trips.

While traveling in Beaufort, South Carolina, Weems died on May 23, 1825, of unspecified causes. He is buried at Bel Air.

== Influence and historical reliability ==
The New York Times has described Weems as one of the "early hagiographers" of American literature, "who elevated the Swamp Fox, Francis Marion, into the American pantheon and helped secure a place there for George Washington".

Weems's name would probably be forgotten today were it not for the tension between the liveliness of his narratives and what Appletons' Cyclopaedia of American Biography (1889) called "this charge of a want of veracity [that] is brought against all Weems's writings," adding that "it is probable he would have accounted it excusable to tell any good story to the credit of his heroes." The cherry-tree anecdote illustrates this point. Another dubious anecdote found in Weems's biography is that of Washington's prayer during the winter at Valley Forge.

According to the historian James M. McPherson, Weems's biography of George Washington was likely Abraham Lincoln's only exposure to the study of history as a boy. In a lecture given on Lincoln's birthday in 2010 at Washington and Lee University, McPherson explained how Lincoln, as president-elect, had spoken to the legislature at Trenton, New Jersey, near the location where, on the day after Christmas 1776, the American Revolution was saved from collapse by Washington's ragged troops. According to McPherson, Lincoln said: "I remember all the accounts in Weems's books of the battlefields and struggles for the liberty of the country and none fixed themselves upon my imagination so deeply as the struggle here at Trenton: the crossing of the river, the contest with the Hessians, the great hardships endured at that time—all fixed themselves on my memory more than any single revolutionary event. I recollect thinking then, boy even though I was, that there must have been something more than common that those men struggled for."

Weems's book Life of George Washington (1800) is an early source that helped popularize the phrase "Don't fire until you see the whites of their eyes!", said to have come from the Battle of Bunker Hill. According to modern scholarly consensus, though, the phrase was never said at the battle and originated elsewhere.

=== Exaltation of Washington ===
The exalted esteem in which the Founding Fathers of the United States, especially George Washington, were held by 19th-century Americans may seem absurd today, but that Washington was so regarded is undisputed. The strength of this esteem can be seen on the ceiling of the United States Capitol Building in the form of Constantino Brumidi's fresco The Apotheosis of Washington.

Weems's A History of the Life and Death, Virtues and Exploits of General George Washington, was a biography written in this spirit, amplified by the florid, rollicksome style that was Weems's trademark. According to this account, his subject was "... Washington, the hero, and the Demigod ..." and at a level above that "... what he really was, [was] 'the Jupiter Conservator,' the friend and benefactor of men." With this hyperbole, Weems elevated Washington to the Augustan level of the god "Jupiter Conservator [Orbis]" (that is, "Jupiter, Conservator of the Empire", later rendered "Jupiter, Savior of the World").

=== Cherry-tree anecdote ===
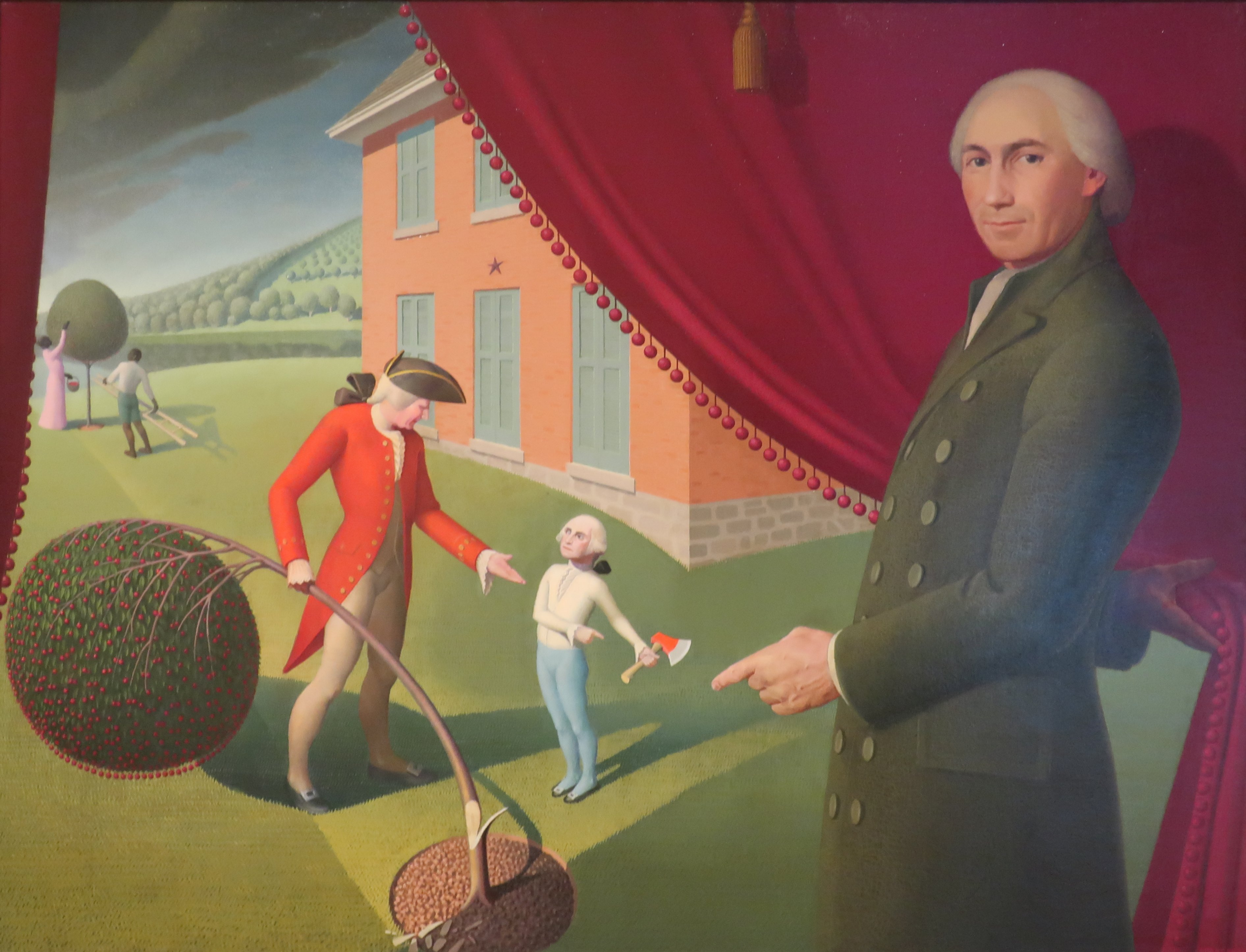
Parson Weems' Fable, a 1939 painting by Grant Wood, depicting both Weems and his "Cherry Tree" story

Among the exaggerated or invented anecdotes is that of the cherry tree, attributed by Weems to "an aged lady, who was a distant relative, and, when a girl, spent much of her time in the family", who referred to young George as "cousin".

The following anecdote is a case in point. It is too valuable to be lost, and too true to be doubted; for it was communicated to me by the same excellent lady to whom I am indebted for the last. "When George," said she, "was about six years old, he was made the wealthy master of a hatchet! Of which, like most little boys, he was immoderately fond, and was constantly going about chopping everything that came in his way. One day, in the garden, where he often amused himself hacking his mother's pea-sticks, he unluckily tried the edge of his hatchet on the body of a beautiful young English cherry-tree, which he barked so terribly, that I don't believe the tree ever got the better of it. The next morning the old gentleman, finding out what had befallen his tree, which, by the by, was a great favourite, came into the house; and with much warmth asked for the mischievous author, declaring at the same time, that he would not have taken five guineas for his tree. Nobody could tell him anything about it. Presently George and his hatchet made their appearance. "George," said his father, "do you know who killed that beautiful little cherry tree yonder in the garden?" This was a tough question; and George staggered under it for a moment; but quickly recovered himself: and looking at his father, with the sweet face of youth brightened with the inexpressible charm of all-conquering truth, he bravely cried out, "I can't tell a lie, Pa; you know I can't tell a lie. I did cut it with my hatchet." "Run to my arms, you dearest boy," cried his father in transports, "run to my arms; glad am I, George, that you killed my tree; for you have paid me for it a thousand fold. Such an act of heroism in my son is more worth than a thousand trees, though blossomed with silver, and their fruits of purest gold."

It went on to be reprinted in the popular McGuffey Reader used by tens of millions of schoolchildren. As a result, the story became part of American culture and is the reason many Americans celebrated Washington's February 22 birthday with cherry dishes.

In his 1889 biography of Washington, Henry Cabot Lodge concluded the cherry tree and other stories recounted by Weems were "on their face hopelessly and ridiculously false." Yet in 1923, Professor Orville Mosher argued against Lodge, and for the truth of the anecdote.

== Cultural references ==
In 1911, Lawrence C. Wroth published Parson Weems: A Biographical and Critical Study. In this, he confronts the fact that Weems is best known for the story of the cherry tree (p. 6) and examines the evidence for its likelihood (pp. 65ff). Wroth held that the story was likely authentic.

Grant Wood painted the scene under the title Parson Weems' Fable in 1939. It is among his gently ironic depictions of Americana and shows the parson pulling back a curtain rimmed with cherries to show the story.

== Sources ==
- A History of the Life and Death, Virtues and Exploits of General George Washington by Mason Locke Weems (abridged)
- Lawrence Wroth, Parson Weems: a Biographical and Critical Study (Eichelberger, 1911).
- "Where the Cherry Tree Grew: An Interview with Phillip Levy". Mount Vernon Ladies' Association.
- James Bish, I Can't Tell A Lie: Parson Weems and the Truth about George Washington's Cherry Tree, Prayer at Valley Forge, and Other Anecdotes (2023)
- Richard Gardiner, "Mason Locke Weems' George Washington: An Exploration of History-Making Through Networks," Fairfax Historical Society Journal, 34 (2026)
- Howard and Jess Dorre, "Unbusting the Cherry Tree Myth," at Plodding through the Presidents (Apple Podcast, April 2025).
- Carl Cannon, Great American Stories, RealClearPublicAffairs, February 21, 2023.
- Austin Washington (a living relative of George), The Education of George Washington (Simon & Schuster, 2014).
- Russell Baker, "The Plausible Tree," New York Times, Feb. 22, 1986.
- W.E. Barton, "Defends Story of Cherry Tree," New York Times, Feb. 13, 1927.
- Walter B. Norris, "Historian of the Cherry Tree, Parson Weems and His Life of Washington," National Magazine, (Vol. 32), 495.
- Professor O.W. Mosher, Parson Weems and that CherryTree Story, New York Times, Feb. 18, 1923.
- Harry Oscar Bishop, That Cherry Tree Story: Not a Myth, National Republican, Volume 14, Issue 10, 14.
