= Rockledge (Occoquan, Virginia) =

Historic house in Virginia, United States

- U.S. National Register of Historic Places
- Virginia Landmarks Register
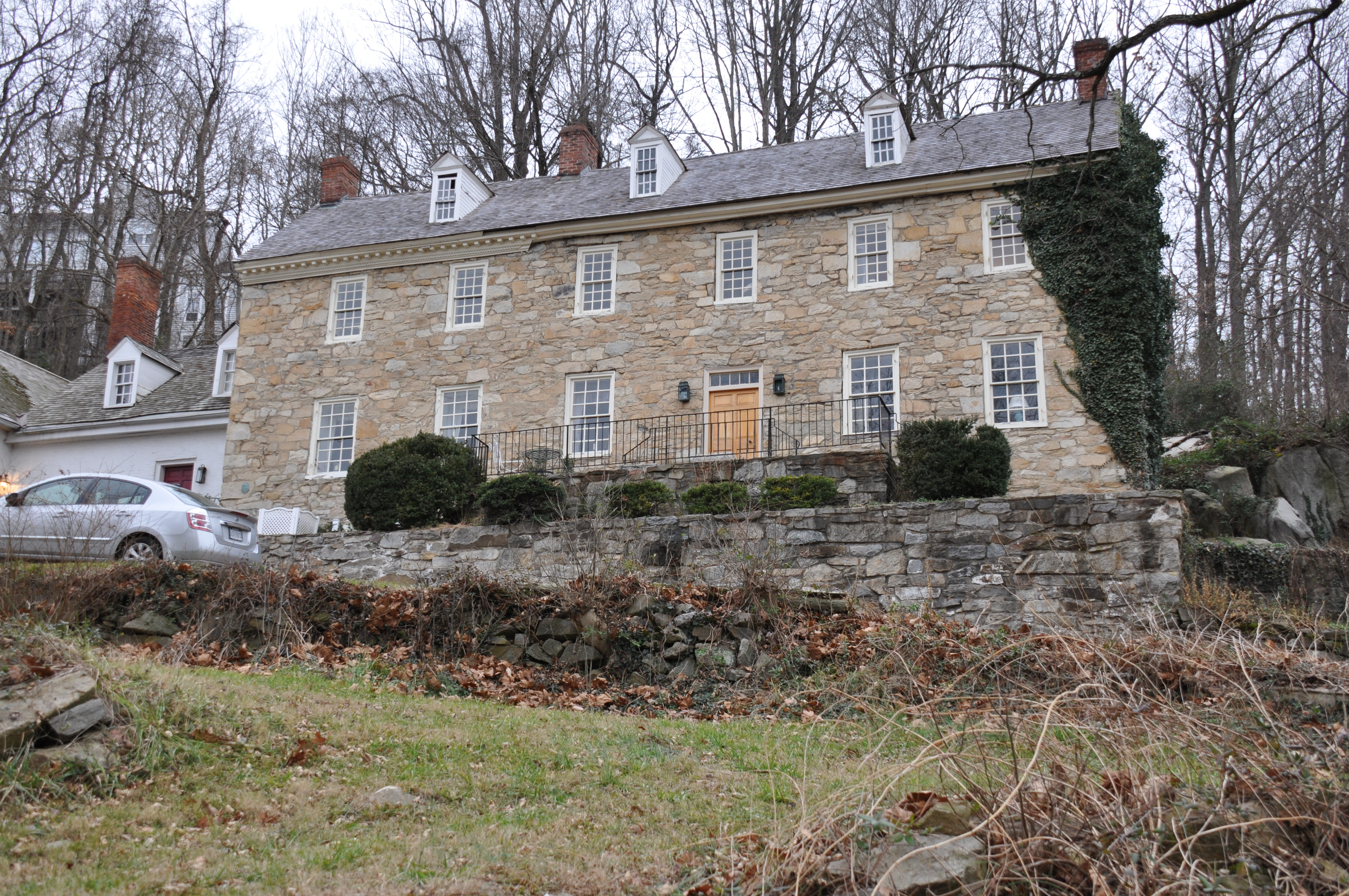
- Rockledge, Occoquan, VA

- Location within Northern Virginia Location within Virginia Location within the United States
- Location: 440 Mills St., Occoquan, Virginia
- Coordinates: 38°41′6″N 77°15′46″W
- Area: 9.9 acres (4.0 ha)
- Architect: William Buckland
- Architectural style: Georgian
- NRHP reference No.: 73002051
- VLR No.: 272-0001

Significant dates
- Added to NRHP: June 25, 1973
- Designated VLR: June 19, 1973

Rockledge, is a historic home located at Occoquan, Prince William County, Virginia, United States, near Washington D.C.

It was built in 1758 from stone at the request of John Balladine, a wealthy local industrialist. Architect William Buckland worked on this house.

The historic marker on the site reads:

John Ballendine built this finely proportioned Georgian House, "Rockledge," in c.1760. William Buckland, a premier colonial Chesapeake architect, reportedly designed it. "Rockledge" is a rare example of a Tidewater Virginia stone dwelling. Several entrepreneurs who sought to maximize Occoquan's potential as a port and industrial town resided there.

It was added to the National Register of Historic Places in 1973.
