= Evergreen (Haymarket, Virginia) =

Historic house in Virginia, United States

- U.S. National Register of Historic Places
- Virginia Landmarks Register
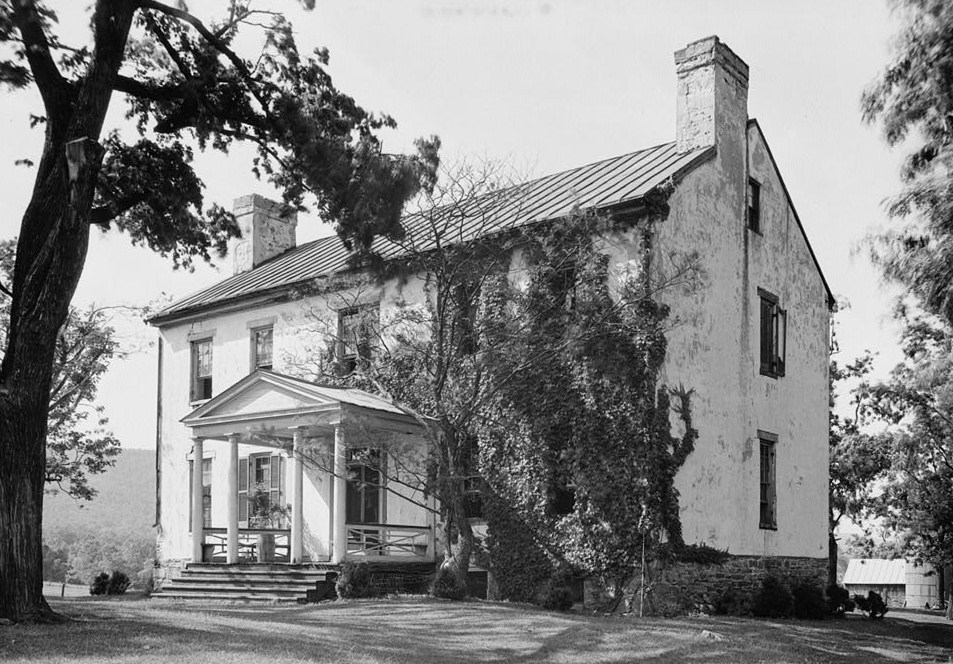
- Evergreen, HABS Photo, 1937

- Location within Northern Virginia Location within Virginia Location within the United States
- Location: 15900 Berkeley Dr., near Haymarket, Virginia
- Coordinates: 38°52′55″N 77°39′44″W
- Area: 4 acres (1.6 ha)
- Built: c. 1827
- Architectural style: Greek Revival, Colonial Revival
- NRHP reference No.: 08000247
- VLR No.: 076-0007

Significant dates
- Added to NRHP: March 27, 2008
- Designated VLR: December 5, 2007

Evergreen, also known as Evergreen Plantation Manor House, is a historic plantation house located near Haymarket, Prince William County, Virginia. It is known for its association with Edmund Berkeley (1824-1915), one of four brothers who led the 8th Virginia Infantry during the American Civil War and who later became a local philanthropist and led many veterans' peace and commemorative activities.

== History ==
Lewis Berkeley (1777-1836) built the house about 1827 and moved from his plantation near Aldie, Virginia. His son Edmund inherited Evergreen. When Edmund married an heiress from Tennessee, Mary Lawson Williams, her father gave Edmund the choice of a dowry in land or in enslaved people, and Edmund Berkeley chose the latter. Thus dozens of enslaved people walked to the northern Virginia plantation from Tennessee. The Berkeleys raised 13 children on the plantation, and owned 52 enslaved people by 1860. The plantation also included a spoke mill, which burned down either early in the war or shortly before the war, and was not rebuilt due to the conflict.

Edmund Berkeley raised a local militia company called the "Evergreen Guards" which was one of eight incorporated into the 8th Virginia Infantry regiment under Col. Eppa Hunton and Major Norborne Berkeley (Edumund's younger brother but an earlier VMI graduate). The unit served with distinction through many battles and was sometimes called the "Berkeley Regiment". Norborne Berkeley soon was elected lieutenant colonel (his brothers Edmund and William captained companies, with the youngest brother Charles as William's lieutenant), and rose to become the unit's colonel with Edmund as lieutenant colonel, William as major and Charles as senior captain. Edmund, Norborne and William Berkeley were all wounded during Pickett's Charge at the Battle of Gettysburg (during which the unit suffered 90% casualties). Only Edmund was not captured afterward; his three brothers were exchanged for Union prisoners by March 18, 1864, and returned to duty. Norborne would suffer from severe rheumatism which led to his resignation and hospitalization in Richmond as the war ended; William and Charles were also captured after the Battle of Sailor's Creek on April 6, 1865.

Edmund returned to rebuild Evergreen after the war, and would found a local agricultural society. Norborne and William would return to farm adjacent estates in Loudoun County, but Norborne especially had severe financial problems and would live at various family estates, including Evergreen, where he died in 1911. Immediately after the war, Norborne was elected as one of Loudoun County's delegates to the Virginia Constitutional Convention of 1868. After the war, Edmund Berkeley became involved in commemorative activities, including the United Confederate Veterans, noting that he was the highest-ranking Confederate officer in his home Prince William County. With Union veteran Lt. George Carr Round, Edmund Berkeley helped plan the Manassas Peace Jubilee in 1911, as well as contributed to Round's campaign to create Manassas National Battlefield Park (the 8th Virginia having fought in both the First Battle of Bull Run and the Second Battle of Bull Run). One of the earliest historic battlefield parks, it was authorized during the Great Depression more than two decades after his death. A historic marker for the Manassas Peace Jubilee, which prompted two larger reunions at Gettysburg, Pennsylvania and the creation of Gettysburg National Military Park is on the Evergreen site.

== Architecture ==
The 2 1/2-story, five-bay, Greek Revival style stone dwelling has a 1 1/2-story east wing and two-story west wing in the Colonial Revival style added about 1940. It sits on an English basement, and has a gable roof and interior end chimneys. The front facade features a three-bay, one-story, gable-roofed portico with a pedimented gable. The rear facade has a full-length, five-bay, two-story portico with large Doric order columns.

The surrounding property was converted to a golf club about 1970. Around 2007, local residents became concerned about the mansion's relative non-use by the golf club, and were concerned that it would become structurally unstable and razed. Instead, a preservation support group was formed and the structure added to the National Register of Historic Places in 2008. It was subsequently converted into the "Inn at Evergreen", with eleven bedrooms and modern amenities under the historic facade.
