= R. Taylor Scott =

American lawyer

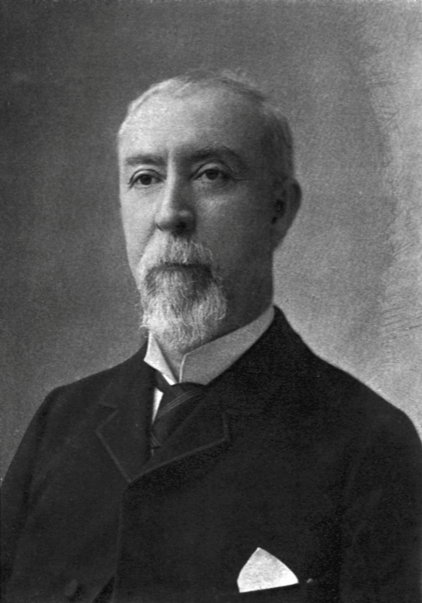

Attorney General of Virginia
- In office January 1, 1890 – August 5, 1897
- Governor: Philip W. McKinney; Charles Triplett O'Ferrall
- Preceded by: Rufus A. Ayers
- Succeeded by: Richard Carter Scott

Member of the Virginia House of Delegates for Loudoun and Fauquier
- In office December 7, 1881 – December 4, 1883
- Preceded by: William H. F. Payne
- Succeeded by: Thomas Smith

Personal details
- Born: March 10, 1834 Warrenton, Fauquier County, Virginia
- Died: August 5, 1897 (aged 63) Warrenton, Virginia
- Profession: Lawyer, politician

Military service
- Allegiance: Confederate States
- Branch/service: Virginia Militia; Confederate States Army
- Rank: Major (CSA)
- Unit: 8th Virginia Infantry
- Battles/wars: Battle of Ball's Bluff; Battle of South Mountain, Battle of Gettysburg

Robert Taylor Scott (1834 – August 5, 1897) was a Virginia lawyer, politician and Confederate officer. Elected three times as Attorney General of Virginia, Scott also served one term in the Virginia House of Delegates and several terms as mayor of Warrenton, Virginia.

== Early and family life ==
Born to Virginia lawyer/planter and Fauquier County delegate Robert Eden Scott (later a circuit judge) and his wife, Scott received a private education, then graduated from the University of Virginia in 1856.

In 1858, Scott married Fanny Scott Carter, who later became president of the Black Horse Chapter of the United Daughters of the Confederacy. Her father Richard Henry Carter had also served in the Virginia House of Delegates. The Scotts had nine children, including Richard Carter Scott (1859-1928), Elizabeth Taylor Scott (1861-2), Robert E. Scott (1866-67), Mary Welby Scott Keith (1870-1958), Rosalie Taylor Scott Hardin (1871-1962), Julian (b./d.1873), Fanny (1877–79), Robert (1879–84) and Edward (b/d1885).

== Early legal and Confederate military career ==
After reading law under his father, Scott was admitted to the Virginia Bar in 1857. In the 1860 Federal Census, Scott owned no real estate, but had $3490 in personal property, namely six slaves (half under 7 years old). By contrast, his father, Robert Eden Scott owned 34 slaves that year, about half children under 15 years of age.

When Virginia seceded from the Union, Scott by July 30, 1861 recruited a company called the either Scott's Company or the Beauregard Rifles. Commissioned a captain, Scott served under the local Commonwealth attorney, Col. Eppa Hunton (who had been a Secession Convention delegate and later was promoted to rank of Brigadier General) and was trained by Major and later Lt.Col. Norborne Berkeley. Scott was Captain of Company K and his father-in-law of Company B, both in the 8th Virginia Infantry. Rising to the rank of major during the American Civil War, Scott served on the staff of Confederate General George E. Pickett, and his father in law on the staff of Gen. Robert E. Lee. His father, however, died in 1862 defending the family's property from Union deserters.

== Legal and political career ==
After the war, Scott entered into a private legal practice with James Vass Brooke, which lasted until 1894. Brooke been Fauquier County's delegate to the Virginia General Assembly as the Civil War began.

After the restoration of civil rights to Confederate veterans, Scott won election to the Virginia Constitutional Convention of 1868 representing Fauquier County, and in 1870 became Warrenton's mayor. In 1881 he followed his father's and father-in-law's path and won election as a delegate to the Virginia General Assembly, representing Loudoun and Fauquier counties. Thomas Smith succeeded him in 1883.

Virginia voters elected Scott Attorney General in 1889. He succeeded Rufus A. Ayers, and won re-election twice. Scott litigated the state debt, and negotiated what came to be known as the Olcutt settlement. He was also active in his Episcopal Church.

== Death and legacy ==
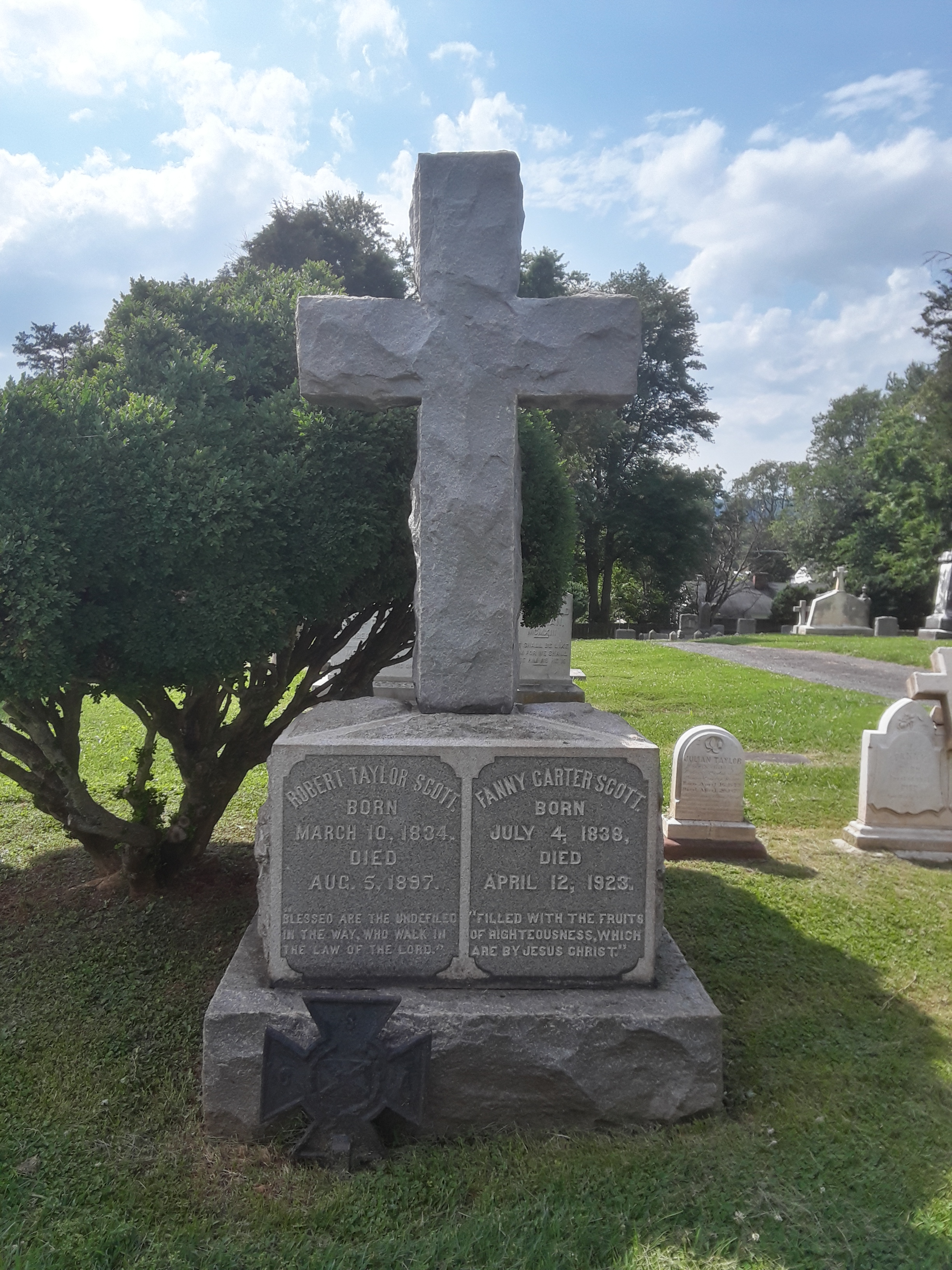
Grave of R. Taylor Scott and Fanny Carter Scott in Warrenton Cemetery

Scott died in office in 1897, and was buried at Warrenton, Virginia. The Virginia Historical Society has his personal papers.
