= Eppa Hunton I =

American planter and politician

Eppa Hunton

Member of the Virginia House of Delegates from Fauquier County
- In office December 3, 1821 – December 1, 1823
- Preceded by: William Thompson
- Succeeded by: John Marshall Jr.

Personal details
- Born: January 30, 1789 Fauquier, Virginia, U.S.
- Died: April 8, 1830 (aged 41) Lancaster, Virginia, U.S.
- Resting place: Mount Hope; 38°47′32.6″N 77°44′02″W
- Party: Democratic-Republican
- Spouse: Elizabeth Marye Brent (m. 1811)
- Children: 11, including Silas and Eppa II
- Relatives: Charles Hunton (brother)

Military service
- Allegiance: United States
- Branch/service: Virginia militia
- Battles/wars: War of 1812

Eppa Hunton (January 30, 1789 – April 8, 1830) was an American planter, military officer, and politician.

== Early life and family ==
=== Childhood ===
Hunton was born on January 30, 1789, at "Fairview" in Fauquier County, Virginia, the second of eight children of Hannah Logan (née Brown) and James Hunton.

=== Marriage ===
Hunton married the former Elizabeth Marye Brent on June 22, 1811. The couple had eleven children: Virginia, Hannah, John, Judith, Silas, James, Eppa, Elizabeth, George, Mary, and Charles.

== Death ==
Hunton died at his home, "Mount Hope", near New Baltimore, Virginia, on April 8, 1830, and was buried in the family cemetery on the property.
