= Charles Hunton =

American planter and politician

19th Speaker of the Virginia Senate
- In office December 5, 1842 – December 4, 1843
- Preceded by: John White Nash
- Succeeded by: Edward Pegram Scott

Member of the Virginia Senate from the Fauquier and Prince William district
- In office December 5, 1831 – December 4, 1843
- Preceded by: John Gibson Jr.
- Succeeded by: John R. Wallace

Personal details
- Born: January 4, 1787 Fairview, Fauquier County, Virginia, U.S.
- Died: June 16, 1853 (aged 66) New Baltimore, Virginia, U.S.
- Party: Democratic
- Relatives: Eppa Hunton I (brother)
- Occupation: Planter; politician

Military service
- Allegiance: United States
- Branch/service: Virginia militia
- Rank: Major
- Battles/wars: War of 1812

Charles H. Hunton (January 4, 1787 – June 16, 1853) was an American planter, military officer, and politician.

== Early life and family ==
=== Childhood ===
Hunton was born on January 4, 1787, at "Fairview" in Fauquier County, Virginia, the first of eight children of James Hunton and Hannah Logan (née Brown) Hunton.

== Death ==
Hunton died at his home, near New Baltimore, Virginia, on June 16, 1853.
