= Robert Eden Scott =

American politician (1808–1862)

Member of the Virginia House of Delegates from the Fauquier County, Virginia district
- In office December 2, 1839 – December 4, 1842 Serving with James K. Marshall; James W. Foster
- Preceded by: Elias Edmunds
- Succeeded by: William R. Smith

Member of the Virginia House of Delegates from the Fauquier County, Virginia district
- In office December 1, 1845 – December 3, 1849 Serving with Thomas Hall; William R. Smith; Alfred Rector
- Preceded by: Elias Edmunds
- Succeeded by: William M. Hume

Member of the Virginia House of Delegates from the Fauquier County, Virginia district
- In office January 12, 1850 – June 7, 1852 Serving with William M. Hume; Silas B. Hunton
- Preceded by: Samuel J. Tabbs
- Succeeded by: Wellington Gordon

Personal details
- Born: April 23, 1808 Warrenton, Fauquier County, Virginia
- Died: May 3, 1862 (aged 54) Warrenton, Virginia
- Party: Whig
- Children: R. Taylor Scott
- Profession: Lawyer, politician

Military service
- Allegiance: Confederate States

Robert Eden Scott (April 23, 1808 – May 3, 1862) was a Virginia planter, lawyer and politician who served many terms in the Virginia General Assembly. He also represented Fauquier County at the Virginia Secession Convention of 1861 and the surrounding district in the Provisional Confederate Congress, until his death at the hands of Union Army deserters while defending his farm.

== Early and family life ==
Born in Fauquier County, Virginia, in 1808 to "Judge" John Scott and his wife Elizabeth Pickett, Robert Eden Scott was the grandson of Episcopal priest Rev. John Scott, who supported independence in the American Revolutionary War. Robert E. Scott survived three wives. On March 10, 1831, he married Elizabeth Taylor, daughter of Alexandria lawyer Robert L. Taylor. Their son R. Taylor Scott was a Virginia lawyer, served in the Confederate States Army in the Civil War, served in the Virginia House of Delegates and was Attorney General of Virginia. His daughter Josephine married Tazewell Ellett.

== Career ==
Scott, a prominent Whig served many times as one of two delegates representing Fauquier County (part-time) in the Virginia House of Delegates, winning election and re-election from 1835–1842 and again from 1845–1852. He was also a delegate to the state constitutional convention of 1850–1851 and the Virginia Secession Convention of 1861, changing his vote between April 4 and 17th to support secession. By 1860, Scott owned 34 slaves, about half children under 15 years of age. Scott also represented the state in the Provisional Confederate Congress from 1861 to 1862.

The autobiography of noted abolitionist Moncure D. Conway (1904) mentions the prominent planter. Conway recalls Scott's pre-Civil War political orientation, "The Hon. Robert E. Scott charmed me by his fine personality and manners, but he was the leading Whig." Conway admired Scott for opposing the "fire eaters" as well as for publicly predicting that secession would end in ruin.

Despite not personally fighting for the Confederacy, Scott was killed by Union deserters when he confronted them for abusing his land.
