= Richard Henry Carter =

Virginia politician and American Civil War officer (1817–1880)

Member of the Virginia House of Delegates from the Fauquier County district
- In office December 5, 1853 – December 7, 1857 Serving with Bailey Shumate
- Preceded by: Silas B. Hunton
- Succeeded by: William D. Scott

Personal details
- Born: April 21, 1817 Marshall, Virginia, US
- Died: April 7, 1880 (aged 62) Panama
- Party: Whig (until 1855); Know Nothing (1855‍–‍1858); Opposition (1858‍–‍1860); Constitutional Union (1860); Conservative (1867‍–‍1871); Republican (1871‍–‍1880)
- Occupation: Planter; politician

Military service
- Allegiance: Confederate States
- Branch/service: Confederate States Army
- Years of service: 1861‍–‍1865
- Rank: Major
- Unit: 8th Virginia Infantry
- Battles/wars: American Civil War; Battle of Gettysburg

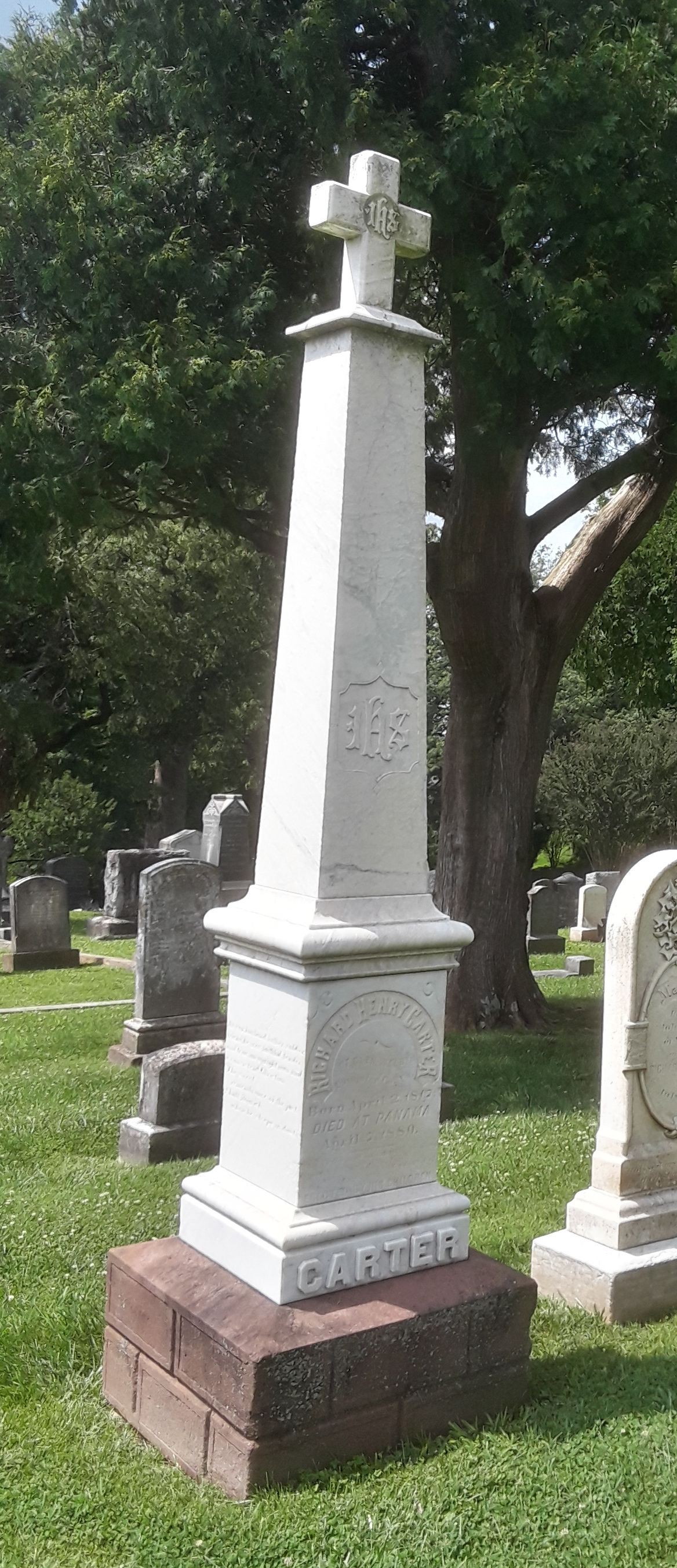
Carter's grave in the Warrenton Cemetery

Richard Henry Carter (April 21, 1817 – April 17, 1880) was a Virginia planter and politician, and a Confederate officer during the American Civil War.

Born to planter Edward Carter (1788–1845) and his wife Frances Toy Carter (1798–1864) at Meadow Grove near Marshall in Fauquier County, Richard had several brothers and sisters. He married Mary Welby DeButts (1819–1885) and they had eleven children, many of whom died in childhood. One of his daughters, Fanny, married R. Taylor Scott.

Carter served as Fauquier County's delegate in the Virginia General Assembly from 1853 until 1856 (winning re-election once).

After Virginia declared its secession, Carter recruited the 8th Virginia Infantry and was commissioned captain of its Company B. He served throughout the war, was wounded at the Battle of Gettysburg and mustered out at Appomattox Court House with the rank of Major. His brothers Winston Fitzhugh Carter and William Fitzhugh Carter also became Confederate officers (Winston dying in 1862), as did his son Edward C. Carter (1843–1928).

Carter died in Panama on April 17, 1880. His corpse was returned for burial in Fauquier County.
