= Prince William County Courthouse =

Historic courthouse in Virginia, US

- U.S. National Register of Historic Places
- Virginia Landmarks Register
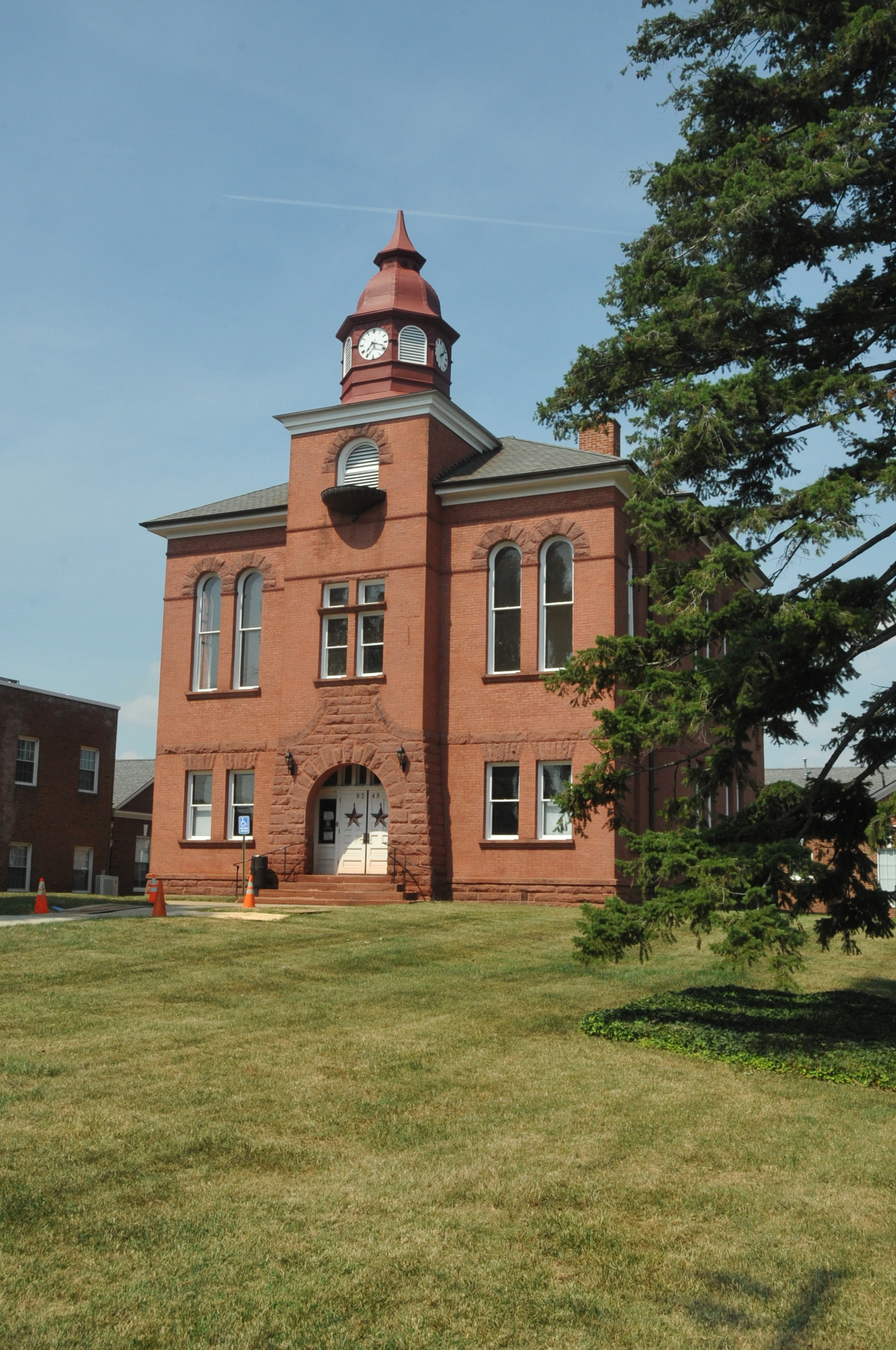
- Prince William County Courthouse, March 2007

- Location within Northern Virginia Location within Virginia Location within the United States
- Interactive map showing the location of Prince William County Courthouse
- Location: 9248 Lee Ave., Manassas, Virginia
- Coordinates: 38°45′17″N 77°28′34″W
- Area: 2.3 acres (0.93 ha)
- Built: 1892-1893
- Architectural style: Romanesque
- NRHP reference No.: 04000039
- VLR No.: 076-5080

Significant dates
- Added to NRHP: February 11, 2004
- Designated VLR: October 3, 2003

Prince William County Courthouse is a historic courthouse located at 9248 Lee Avenue, Manassas, Prince William County, Virginia. Rehabilitated in 2000–2001, it currently houses some offices of the Prince William County clerk, and the historic courtroom upstairs can be rented for events.

== History ==
The county's fifth courthouse was built in 1892–1893, on land donated by former Union officer and Virginia lawyer and delegate George Carr Round. After several legal disputes, including one decided by the Virginia Supreme Court, the county government moved to this building near the county's most important railroad station, from the centrally located but increasingly isolated Brentsville Courthouse and Jail. This became the county's courthouse in 1897. On July 21, 1911, U.S. President William Howard Taft and Virginia Governor William Hodges Mann shook hands on the courthouse lawn during the Manassas Peace Jubilee commemorating the 50th anniversary of the First Battle of Bull Run, the first major conflict of the American Civil War.

The town of Manassas became large enough for the Virginia General Assembly to incorporate it as a city in the 1970s, which caused several complications for the old courthouse. After negotiations, title to the courthouse building and the jail (razed years later) remained in the County, and various town (city) offices moved out of the building. The county property became surrounded by city land, much of which became included in a national historic district in 2004. Meanwhile, by 1980, the space had become too cramped for judicial operations in the growing county, so another courthouse was built about a mile away. This building continued actively use as a county courthouse until 1982.

The current (modern) courthouse containing both the Prince William Circuit Court and the Prince William District Court is at 9311 Lee Avenue in Manassas, VA 20110, and has several parking lots nearby.

== Architecture ==
The two-story, Romanesque style polychromatic brick building measures 52 feet by 60 feet and has a hipped roof. The front facade is symmetrical and features a projecting central bay forming a three-story clock tower topped with a cupola. It was added to the National Register of Historic Places in 2004.
