= Norborne Berkeley (soldier) =

- Born: March 31, 1828 near Aldie, Virginia, U.S.
- Died: January 12, 1911 (aged 82); Haymarket, Virginia, U.S.
- Spouse: Lavinia Hart
- Children: 4 sons
- Military career
- Allegiance: Virginia; Confederate States of America
- Branch: Virginia Militia; Confederate Army
- Rank: Colonel (CSA)
- Unit: 8th Virginia Infantry
- Conflicts: American Civil War: Battle of Gettysburg

Norborne Berkeley (March 31, 1828 – January 12, 1911) was a northern Virginia planter who became an officer in the Confederate Army during the American Civil War, and afterward served in the Virginia Constitutional Convention of 1868 representing Loudoun County.

== Early life and education ==
Norborne Berkeley was the third son of Lewis Berkeley and Frances Callendar Noland. He was born near Aldie in Loudoun County, although his father soon built Evergreen plantation in nearby Prince William County, and moved there before 1830. His name honors the Virginia governor known as Lord Botetourt, although not an ancestor. His elder brothers who also became Confederate officers serving in the 8th Virginia Infantry Regiment (sometimes known as the "Berkeley Regiment") Lt.Col. Edmund Callendar Berkeley, who inherited Evergreen, organized the "Evergreen Guards" which became Company C in the unit, and after the war served one term in the Virginia House of Delegates and became known for philanthropic and veterans' activities, including the Manassas Peace Jubilee. Major William Noland Berkeley formed the Champe Rifles, Company D. The youngest brother, Capt. Charles Fenton Mercer Berkeley, served under his brother William N. Berkeley and was captured twice during the conflict. Their sister Mary Lewis Berkeley married Richard Smith Cox, son of the Georgetown's mayor. Berkeley received a private education appropriate to his class, including at Episcopal High School in Alexandria, Virginia. This Norborne Berkeley entered the Virginia Military Institute and graduated in 1848.

== Personal life ==
In 1849 Berkeley married Lavinia Hart Berkeley (daughter of a distant cousin, Dr. Edmund Berkeley and granddaughter of Dr. Carter Burwell Berkeley). They had four sons who survived their father, but also moved out of state after the conflict. Their eldest, Edmund Spottswood Berkeley (b. 1859) moved to Van Vleck, Texas. Norborne Berkeley Jr. (b. 1861) moved to Pendleton, Oregon. Charles Carter Berkeley moved to Seattle, Washington. William Noland Berkeley (b. 1867) moved to Annapolis, Maryland.

== Prewar farmer ==
When he turned 25, his father gave him a farm "Stoke" in Loudoun County, and died not long afterward. Norborne Berkeley owned $20,000 in personal property (including 20 slaves ranging from two 70-year-old men and 7 children under 10) in 1860. Berkeley also admitted in his postwar pardon application that he inherited slaves from his father.

== Confederate service ==
Before Virginia seceded from the Union in early 1861, Berkeley had been training with a local militia company in Loudoun County. Local Commonwealth's attorney Charles Tebbs had organized the unit, but had problems in maintaining discipline, relying on this Berkeley for that function. Norborne Berkeley received a commission as major in the unit, which was part of Eppa Hunton's 8th Virginia Infantry. Three of Berkeley's younger brothers also joined, and Molly Berkeley convinced her husband to join the Confederate cause and moved their family as well to Aldie, although the many related Berkeley families (with their enslaved servants but without their officer fathers/husbands) would move to Hanover, Caroline and Goochland counties during the war.

After Tebbs left for desk duty in Richmond, the men of the 8th Virginia elected Norborne Berkeley their Lt. Colonel on April 27, 1862. He was promoted to colonel on August 9, 1863 on account of his actions at the Battle of Gettysburg, where he was wounded in the leg and taken prisoner, as were his younger brothers William Noland Berkeley and Charles Berkeley (his brother Edmund was wounded but not captured).

Norborne Berkeley was taken to the Point Lookout Prison hospital in Maryland in October 1863. In February 1864 he was moved to Johnson's Island in Ohio, from which he was exchanged for a Union prisoner on March 18, 1864 (as were his younger brothers earlier the same month). However, by October 1864 Norborne Berkeley was hospitalized in the Chester hospital. He allegedly received a brevet promotion to brigadier general. He was present at the Howlett Line on January 28, 1865, but resigned on March 2, 1865 due to chronic rheumatism and spent the next weeks in a Richmond hospital. He was paroled on April 24, 1865.

== Postwar career ==
After the war, Norborne Berkeley returned to Loudoun County, but his health problems continued. He sold his primary plantation, Stoke, to his brother-in-law, pardoned Confederate paymaster Richard Cox, in part to pay off debts. However, Cox also had financial problems and lost both his Georgetown house and Stoke to foreclosure by 1876. Loudoun County voters narrowly (by 100 votes) elected Norborne Berkeley and fellow former Confederate (and POW) Dr. George E. Plaster (of the 6th Virginia Cavalry) to the Virginia Constitutional Convention of 1868, over William Williams of Waterford and former Union captain John G. Viall.

However, in the next election, Berkeley failed to win election as county treasurer, perhaps because of his well-known financial problems. He lost to a Republican running as an independent. Thus, the Conservative party did not sweep Loudoun offices in that election. Berkeley then ended his overt political involvement, although he lived at various Berkeley family properties in northern Virginia and would briefly teach at Virginia Tech in Blacksburg, Virginia.

== Death and legacy ==
Norborne Berkeley died at his brother's Evergreen manor house in Haymarket, Virginia on January 19, 1911. On February 24, 2001 at Mt. Atlas mansion in Haymarket, the Prince William County Historical Commission discovered an undated, postwar manuscript that this Norborne Berkeley prepared which concerns the First Battle of Manassas.

Norborne Berkeley's prewar manor house, Stoke, still exists today near Aldie, Virginia, and was placed on the Virginia Landmarks register and on the National Register of Historic places in 2015, in part because of its association with him, but mainly for association with prize-winning horticulturalist Eleanor Truax Harris (1868-1937), whose second husband Col. Floyd Harris extensively remodeled the house. Eleanor Truax Harris operated "Berkeley Gardens" early in the 20th century, which used local labor and provided cut flowers for the Washington D.C. market even during the Great Depression. Two other Virginia legal graduates named Norborne Berkeley have some historical significance, but are related to Lord Botetourt rather than this Col. Norborne Berkeley. Norborne Berkeley (1918-1964) was a lawyer and business executive born in Danville, Virginia who became vice-president of Bethlehem Steel in Pennsylvania and who donated his papers to the University of Virginia. His son Norborne Berkeley Jr. (1922-2011) also graduated from the University of Virginia Law School and became President of Chemical Bank (later part of J.P. Morgan Chase).
