= Eppa Hunton =

American confederate general and politician (1822–1908)

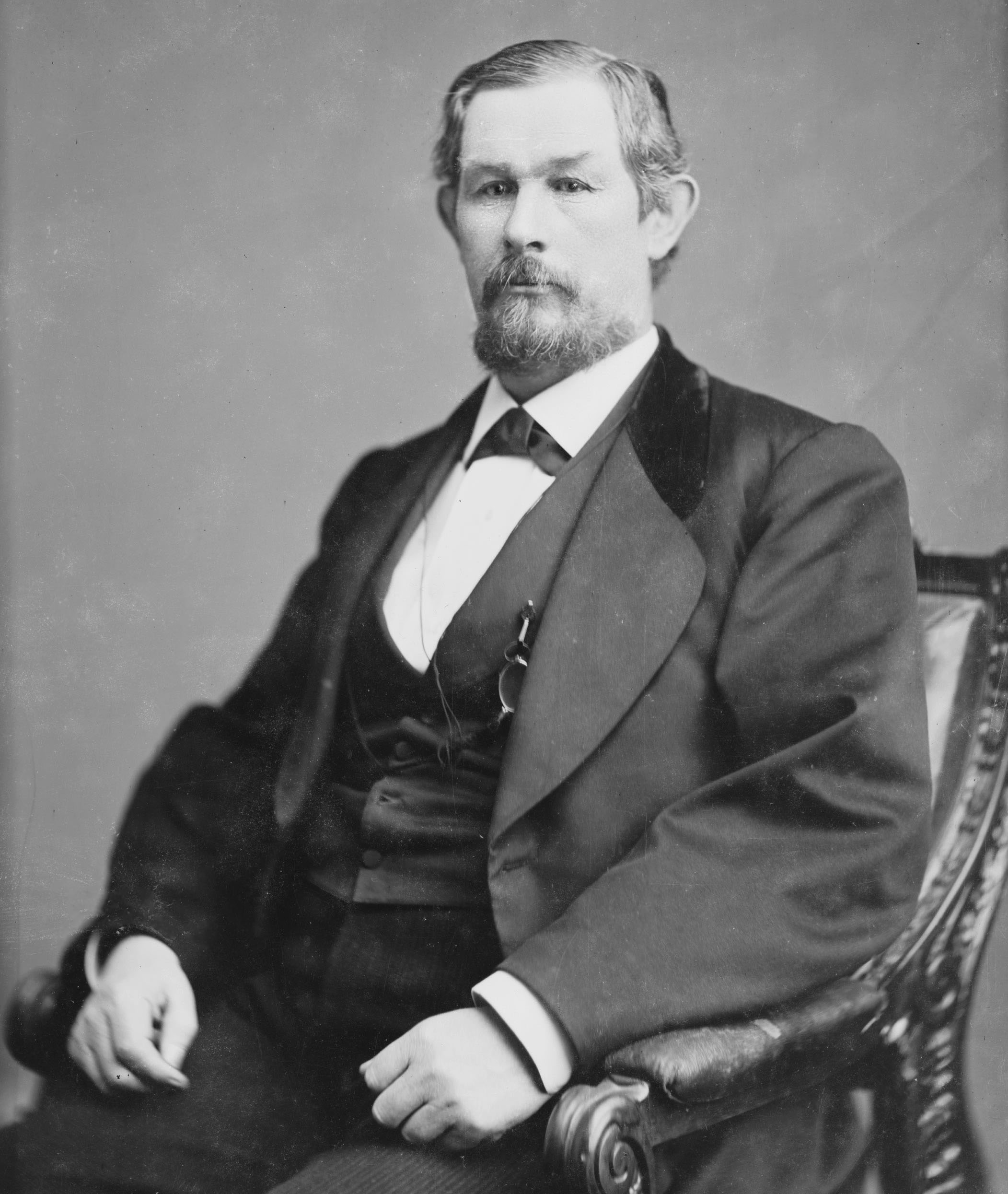

United States Senator from Virginia
- In office May 28, 1892 – March 4, 1895
- Preceded by: John S. Barbour Jr.
- Succeeded by: Thomas S. Martin

Member of the U.S. House of Representatives from Virginia's 8th district
- In office March 4, 1873 – March 4, 1881
- Preceded by: William Terry
- Succeeded by: John S. Barbour Jr.

Personal details
- Born: Eppa Hunton II; September 24, 1822 Warrenton, Virginia, U.S.
- Died: October 11, 1908 (aged 86) Richmond, Virginia, U.S.
- Resting place: Hollywood Cemetery; 37°31′54.2″N 77°27′36″W
- Party: Democratic
- Spouse: Lucy Caroline Weir (m. 1848; died 1899)
- Children: 2, including Eppa Jr.
- Parent: Eppa Hunton I (father)
- Relatives: Silas B. Hunton (brother)
- Profession: Lawyer; military officer; politician

Military service
- Allegiance: Virginia; Confederate States
- Branch/service: Virginia Militia; Confederate States Army
- Rank: Brigadier general (Virginia); Brigadier general (CSA)
- Battles/wars: American Civil War

Eppa Hunton II (September 24, 1822 – October 11, 1908) was a Virginia lawyer and soldier who rose to become a brigadier general in the Confederate Army during the American Civil War. After the war, he served as a Democrat in both the United States House of Representatives and then the United States Senate from Virginia.

== Early years ==
Hunton was born on September 24, 1822 near Warrenton, Virginia, to Eppa Hunton I (1789–1830) and the former Elizabeth Marye Brent (1789–1866), who had married on June 22, 1811, in Fauquier County. He was their third son, after the twins John Heath Hunton and George William Hunton, who were born in 1826. Both families had emigrated from England in the 17th century. The Brent family had moved across the Potomac River from Maryland before Bacon's Rebellion and by the time of the Revolutionary War were important planters and lawyers in Stafford County, Virginia and western area's of the Northern Neck proprietary (and the only prominent somewhat Catholic family in Virginia, with Robert Brent becoming the first mayor of the District of Columbia). The Huntons had initially settled in Lancaster County, Virginia before moving to what became eastern Fauquier County, Virginia near its border with Prince William County, Virginia (now the Buckland Historic District). His man's father taught school and operated three plantations: "Springfield" and "Mount Hope" in Fauquier County (whose seat was Warrenton, though the plantations were near New Baltimore, which became the family graveyard) and another in nearby Prince William County. The senior Eppa Hunton had fought in the War of 1812 under his cousin Thomas Hunton, who led a Fauquier County cavalry troop of the 5th Brigade, 2nd Regiment before rising to the rank of Brigadier General of that brigade in 1819, as well as winning election to the Virginia House of Delegates 1803-1808 and 1813-1814, but who died in 1826. The elder Eppa Hunton appeared likely to have a similar career, becoming the brigade inspector and twice won election to the Virginia House of Delegates, but died unexpectedly young in Lancaster in 1830. This left his widow to raise nine young children (two others having died as infants), and the Prince William plantation was sold to pay debts. His mother's father, William Brent, was a lawyer who had fought in the American Revolutionary War, and had moved his family from the port of Dumfries in Prince William County to Bealeton in Fauquier County for safekeeping during that war. The Prince William county seat, Brentsville (near the county's center), was named for that family. This Eppa Hunton was educated at the private New Baltimore Academy by Rev. John Ogilvie, although family circumstances forced him to borrow money to finish his final year in 1839.

== Early career ==
After graduating from that school, this Eppa Hunton taught for three years, first in a log schoolhouse near The Plains in Fauquier County. Then he opened his own school in Buckland in Prince William County, where he lived with his brother Silas and his wife. Hunton taught the five sons of John Webb Tyler, who in turn helped him to study law and become admitted to the Virginia bar in 1843. Hunton thus began his legal practice in Brentsville, the Prince William County seat. He also became prominent in the local community, winning election as colonel, and later brigadier general, in the Virginia militia.

After Virginia's legislature elected J.W. Tyler as circuit judge, Hunton was elected his successor as Commonwealth's attorney (local prosecutor) in 1848. Voters re-elected him twice, so he served from 1849–1861. In 1850, this Eppa Hunton, at age 30, owned six slaves: a 30-year-old black woman and five children (a 14-year-old mulatto girl, five- and ten-year-old black boys, and three-year-old and five-month-old black girls). Hunton later described himself as a Democrat from his "earliest youth" like his father, and he was one of Virginia's delegates to the Democratic National Convention in 1856, and was a Breckenridge elector in 1860, later describing the multiple conventions that year that divided the Democratic party.

== Family life ==
In 1848, Eppa Hunton married Lucy Caroline Weir (February 20, 1825 – September 4, 1899), daughter of Robert and Clara Boothe Weir. Her family could trace their ancestry to Judge Benjamin Waller of Williamsburg, and her father had been a successful merchant in Tappahannock before moving to Prince William County and running a plantation called "Hartford" until he died in 1840, leaving his widow with young children. During the April after Lucy's marriage to Eppa Hunton, Mrs. Weir sold "Hartford" and moved with her daughters Betty and Martha to the new home Hunton had purchased in Brentsville. There she lived with the young family until Union soldiers destroyed the home in 1862. Mrs. Weir would continue to live with the Huntons until her death in Warrenville in 1870, and Martha until her death in 1882, although Betty would move in with relatives in Clarke County after Lucy's death.

The Huntons had two children:

- Elizabeth Boothe Hunton (June 20, 1853 – September 30, 1854)
- Eppa Hunton III (commonly known as "Eppa Hunton Jr.;" April 14, 1855 – March 5, 1932), who became his father's law partner, and went on to co-found the notable Richmond law firm Hunton & Williams in 1901.

Considerably after the Civil War described below, Hunton's brother James died, and Eppa Hunton provided for his children, especially Bessie Marye Hunton (named after their mother), paying for her education and ultimately blessing her marriage.

== Civil War ==
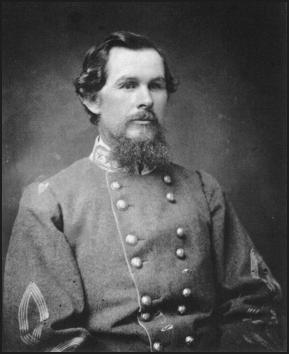
Brig. Gen. Eppa Hunton

In February 1861, Prince William County voters elected Hunton, an avowed secessionist, as their delegate to the Virginia Secession Convention, as he handily defeated a Unionist candidate, Allen Howison. At the Convention Hunton made many contacts which proved important later in his career, from former U.S. President John Tyler, to Governor John Letcher, Lt. Gov. Montague, and former Navy Secretary Ballard Preston.

With the outbreak of the American Civil War, Hunton relinquished his militia commission and secured a commission as colonel of the 8th Virginia Infantry, Confederate States Army, composed of seven companies from Loudoun County, two from Fauquier County and one each from Fairfax County and Prince William County. Initially, Charles B. Tebbs was his lieutenant colonel and Norborne Berkeley as the regimental major. The regiment (then of eight companies) was assigned to guard the Potomac River in Loudoun County, along with the Loudoun Cavalry and a Loudoun artillery regiment. During the First Battle of Bull Run on July 21, 1861, Gen. P.G.T. Beauregard cited its gallantry coming off reserve status in his summary of the Confederate victory. It was then again assigned to protect Leesburg, Virginia, the seat of Loudoun County and an important crossroads for trade across the Potomac River as well as across the Blue Ridge Mountains. Although General Beauregard refused to let Col. Hunton take leave to visit his sick wife five miles from that battlefield, Hunton received several leaves from duty during the war due to a fistula which failed to heal, despite various surgeries, until he became a prisoner of war during the war's final days. In October his regiment was part of Nathan G. Evans' brigade near Leesburg, where the temporarily recovered Hunton led his command against a Union force at Ball's Bluff, driving it into the Potomac River. Captains William N. Berkeley and Edmond Berkeley were also cited for their enthusiasm, and for his initiative in capturing about 325 Union prisoners local farmer E.V. White (a/k/a Lige White) would soon be promoted to captain (and ultimately to colonel).

In 1862 the regiment left the Centreville area to oppose the Union's Peninsular Campaign. With the confederate evacuation of Northern Virginia Huntons hometown got under union occupation and he had to evacuate his family through Charlottesville to Lynchburg. Despite still suffering from fistula Hunton returned from sick leave to command his regiment from the withdrawal under Yorktown to defend Richmond. Hunton missed both the Battle of Williamsburg and the Battle of Seven Pines due to sickness. Anticipating the Seven Days Battles he disregarded his physician's advise and returned to the army to fight at the Battle of Frazier's Farm and Battle of Gaines' Mill (which Hunton later cited as the unit's most gallant charge). On August 21, 1862, the regiment fought at the Second Battle of Bull Run. Hunton's regiment then crossed the Potomac River and as he again returned to duty fought at the South Mountain and the bloody Antietam. After retreating to Virginia, it returned to fight on December 13 at the Battle of Fredericksburg and again the following month, under the command of General Richard B. Garnett, although it would miss the Battle of Chancellorville because it was assigned to secure supplies in North Carolina.

Promoted to brigade command late because of his ongoing health issues, Hunton was assigned to Lt. Gen. James Longstreet's corps, Maj. Gen. George Pickett's division, and the Army of Northern Virginia. In August 1863, Hunton formally received a promotion to brigadier general, based on his valor during the Battle of Gettysburg, particularly during Pickett's Charge in which Hunton received a leg wound. Because of his promotion, Norborne Berkeley was promoted to command the 8th Virginia, and his brother Edmund became the Lieut. Colonel, his brother William Berkeley, Major, and Charles Berkeley became the senior Captain of what then became known as the "Berkeley Regiment." After service in the defenses of Richmond in 1864 including the Battle of Malvern Hill, Gen. Hunton rejoined Pickett's division and fought at Cold Harbor and once again defended Richmond and Petersburg siege lines. In March 1865 his command (by then reduced to 1500 men) fought a delaying action at Five Forks, which turned into a rout.

As April 1865 began, Hunton's brigade was again forced to retreat, and skirmished at the Battle of Sayler's Creek. Hunton surrendered his troops to Union forces (a staff officer of future Gen. George Armstrong Custer) after that skirmish, on April 6, 1865, so he missed General Lee's surrender at Appomattox Court House three days later. He and other former Confederate officers alternately took ambulances and marched to City Point, then Petersburg, then Washington, D.C. He and a dozen other former senior officers were in New Jersey en route to Massachusetts when they learned of President Lincoln's assassination and noted the Union officers refused to succumb to mob cries of "hang them" at every station, although he also took umbrage at his companion General Ewell's proposed resolution of the prisoners denying any complicity in the assassination. Hunton recovered his health as a prisoner of war at Fort Warren (Massachusetts), especially noting the professionalism of its commanding officer, a career officer from North Carolina named Wilson, and two local families. He was paroled on July 24. While a prisoner of war, Hunton thought of his lawbooks, as well as worried that his wife and children were penniless in Lynchburg, especially since he had invested all his savings in now-worthless Virginia State Bonds. He learned they refused money offered them by a staff officer of Federal Major John W. Turner (against whom Hunton had fought for many months and found chivalrous), but managed to secure a $50 loan from family friend John H. Reid, then survived on that money until Hunton's brother Silas managed to get to Lynchburg and escorted them to Culpeper, where they stayed with the family of Hunton's sister Elizabeth and brother in law, Lt. Morehead (who had distinguished himself at the Battle of Ball's Bluff).

== Post-war politics ==
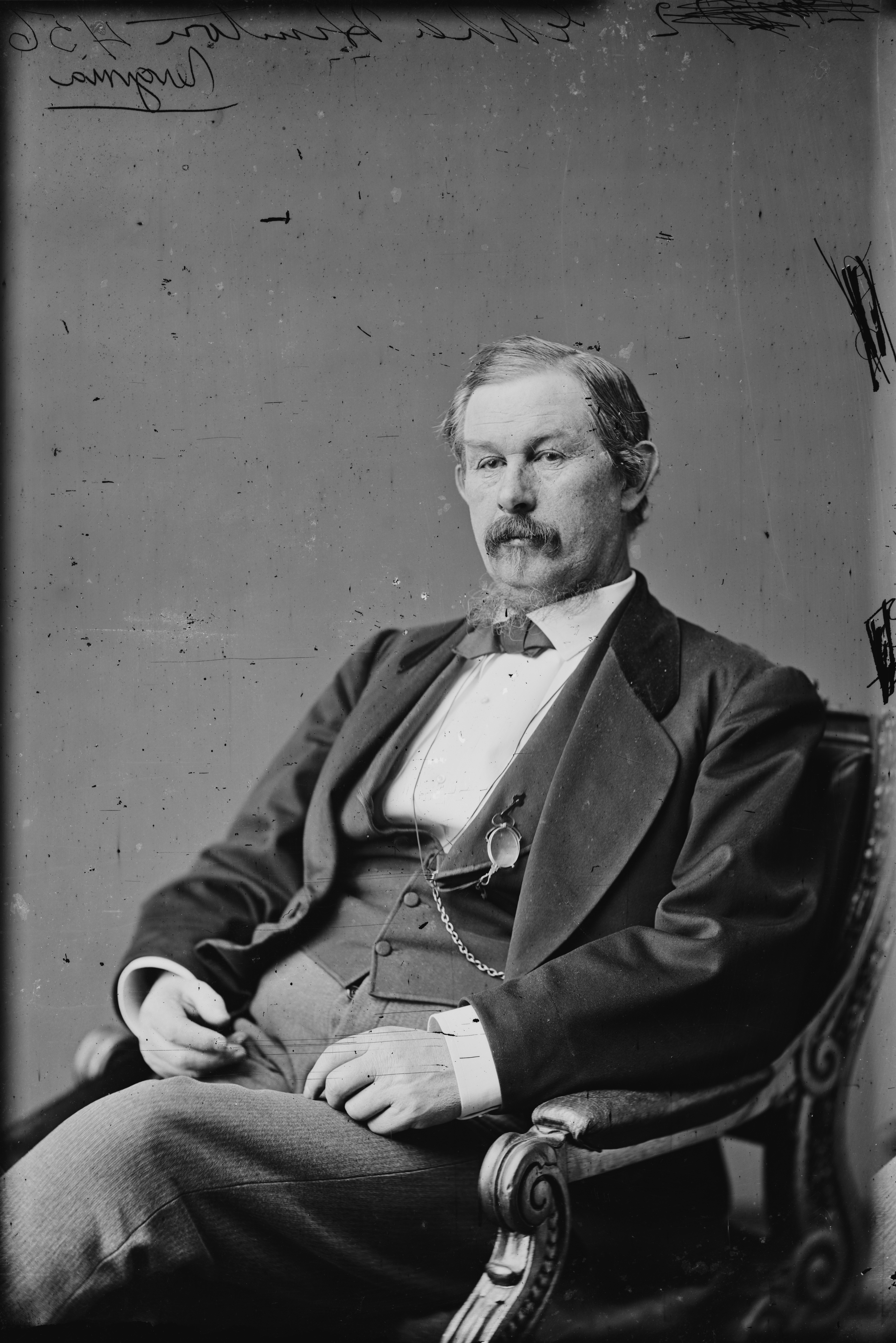
Hunton at the time of his congressional service

After the war Hunton resumed his former law practice in northern Virginia, initially in Prince William County as well as Fauquier and Loudoun, but by year's end moved his family to Warrenton, where he bought a house in 1867. He later noted that two servant girls (one of whom he had bought so she would not be sold away from her family) had accompanied his wife and family to and from Lynchburg, so that after returning from prison, he told them they were free, and paid their stage fare from Clarke County to their family in Alexandria.

As Hunton's career restarted, he also returned to politics, opposing Congressional Reconstruction and particularly disabilities which the Virginia Constitutional Convention of 1868 sought to place on former Confederates. The Constitutional Convention was necessary because Virginia's state constitution of 1850 explicitly endorsed slavery, and the constitutional convention during the American Civil War only had representatives from Union-occupied portions of the Commonwealth and was generally disregarded. Based on negotiations with the newly elected president, Ulysses S. Grant and successive military governors responsible for Virginia, the election to ratify the new state constitution separately considered the document (which was overwhelmingly ratified by voters) and the disabilities on former Confederates (which were narrowly defeated). Hunton thought the Freedman's Bureau created problems, and that he got along well with Gen. John Schofield, the governor of military district No. 1, as well as the local military judge Lysander Hill.

Hunton was also nominated for the state senate for Fauquier and Rappahannock counties after the war, and may have been elected after the war, but unable to take his seat. With his disability removed by Presidential pardon, Hunton was elected as a Democrat from Virginia in November 1872, and served in the 43rd and the three succeeding Congresses (March 4, 1873 – March 4, 1881). He defeated Republican Edward Daniels, a former abolitionist from Massachusetts who had moved into Gunston Hall and who later would become a Democrat. During his years as a Representative, Hunton served on the Committee on Military Affairs and voted to exonerate Gen. Custer, who had been kind to him. He noted the "Democratic wave" in the 1874 election, and that while Virginia only sent one other Democrat in 1872, he had seven democratic colleagues in the state delegation in 1874. Hunton became chairman of the Committee on Revolutionary Pensions (44th Congress). In the 46th Congress, he became chairman of the Committee on the District of Columbia (although he was disappointed at his removal from the House Judiciary Committee by the new Speaker in the 45th Congress, whom he had supported), and worked across the aisle with Joseph C.S. Blackburn of Kentucky to improve governance of the federal city, both securing passage of a new 3-commissioner system as well as payment of tax arrearages by corporations and others seeking favors from his committee. Hunton was also appointed to lead a committee investigating allegations of corruption involving former Speaker James Blaine, but the controversial investigation ended after Blaine secured possession of some incriminating letters, and soon was elected to the U.S. Senate, thus giving up his House seat and removing the committee's jurisdiction, although the scandal probably lost Blaine his chance for his party's presidential nomination in 1876, which went to Rutherford B. Hayes instead. Meanwhile, Hunton was the only southerner appointed to the 15-member Electoral Commission created by an act of Congress in 1877 to decide the contests in various states in the presidential election of 1876.

In 1876, Hunton easily defeated Republican J.C. O'Neal, and after a primary challenge by S. Chapman Neale of Alexandria, handily defeated both Republican Mr. Cochran of Culpeper and Greenback Democrat Capt. John R. Carter (his former subordinate, from Loudoun) in 1878. However, he announced that would be his final term in Congress, and declined renomination in 1880, instead resuming his private legal practice, perhaps in part because he was supporting the family of his brother James, who had died in 1877 (including paying for the education of his niece Bessie Marye Hunton) and his son Eppa Hunton Jr. also graduated from the University of Virginia and his father brought him into the legal practice. In addition to practicing with his son in northern Virginia, he established a partnership with Jeff Chandler in Washington, which flourished until Chandler moved to St. Louis.

Railroad executive John S. Barbour Jr. (whose brother James Barbour of Culpeper had lost to Hunton in the 1874 election as an independent with Mosby's support) succeeded him. John Barbour Jr. served three terms, then won election as Virginia's U.S. Senator, but died after three years in office. On May 28, 1892, Hunton was appointed to fill Barbour's senate seat, and won the subsequently election to fill that vacancy, serving until March 4, 1895. During his term, he was chairman of the U.S. Senate Committee to Establish a University of the United States (1893–1895). However, he was deeply disappointed in President Grover Cleveland, who although a fellow Democrat, undercut and divided the party concerning the tariff, free silver, and other issues. On or about April 1, 1894, Hunton became indirectly involved in voting bribery attempts. Charles W. Buttz, a lobbyist and claim agent originally from North Dakota, but living in Washington, D.C. at the time, went to Hunton's house in Warrenton during the Senator's absence. Buttz told Hunton's son, Eppa III, that he would pay him a contingent fee of $25,000 if he would, by presenting arguments as to the pending tariff bill, induce his father to vote against it. Excerpts from the Senate investigating committee on this issue follow:

This offer was declined at once and peremptorily by Eppa Hunton [III], as set forth in his testimony, and the whole matter was communicated by him to his father. Senator Hunton availed himself of the first opportunity to disclose the matter to certain of his friends in the senate, as appears in the testimony, and was in no other way connected with the transaction.

Buttz also attempted to bribe South Dakota Senator James Henderson Kyle to vote against the same bill. Hunton and Kyle were eventually exonerated from all blame.

Hunton remained active in the United Confederate Veterans in his later years. In 1895, the 8th Virginia Regiment held its first reunion at Ball's Bluff, site of one of their triumphs, and Hunton addressed them. In 1902, Virginia judge James Keith presented a portrait of Hunton to the Lee Camp of the UCV in Richmond.

== Death and legacy ==
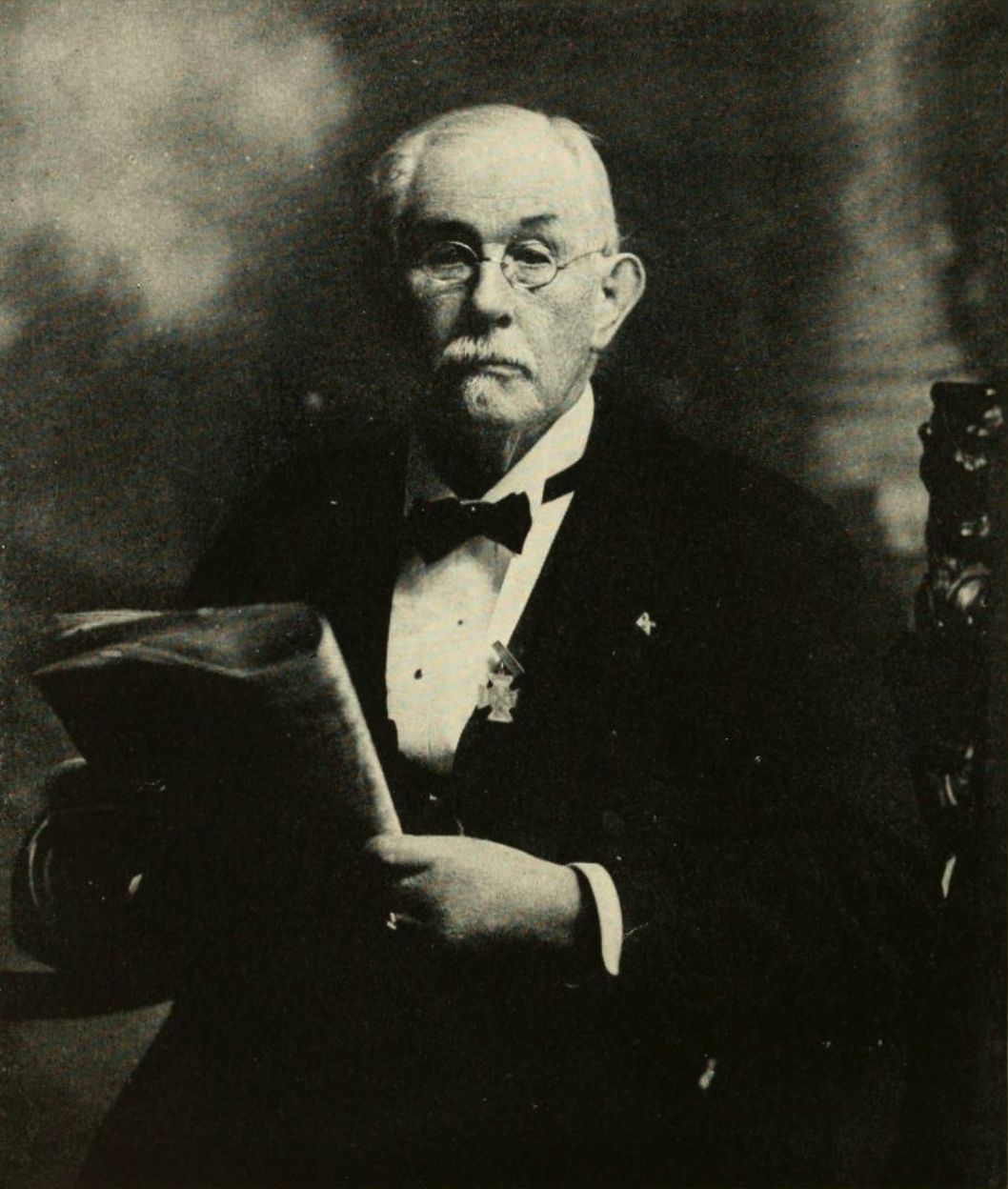
An elderly Hunton in 1904

Afterward, Hunton again resumed his law practice in Warrenton, Virginia. However, after his wife's death, and his son's remarriage to his first wife's sister, Virginia Payne, he decided better opportunities awaited his son in Richmond, particularly after the younger Eppa Hunton's participation at the Virginia Constitutional Convention of 1902. This Eppa Hunton sold his Warrenton house and gave his son the proceeds to buy a home in Richmond. Hunton wrapped up his final cases from Washington, D.C., wrote his autobiography and lived the rest of his days with the growing young family at 8 Franklin Street in Richmond, grateful that a Richmond doctor had cured his vertigo, unlike the smaller town's doctors. On October 11, 1908, blind and deaf though previously vigorous, Hunton died at his son's home. He was buried in the city's Hollywood Cemetery with his wife Clara and many fellow Confederate veterans.

His name continues to be used within the family, currently by Eppa Hunton VI, who practices law in Richmond. In 1977, Hunton & Williams established the Eppa Hunton IV Memorial Book Award at the University of Virginia's School of Law, in honor of this Eppa Hunton's grandson (1904–1976), whose baptism the grandfather had witnessed at St. James Episcopal Church in Warrenton. According to the university, the award is "presented annually to a third-year student who has demonstrated unusual aptitude in litigation courses and shown a keen awareness and understanding of the lawyer's ethical and professional responsibility."

Some of his speeches are held at the Library of Congress in Washington, D.C., among others in the papers of Frederick Douglass. His home in Warrenton, Brentmoor is a historic site, although perhaps now better known for its links to its builder Judge Edward M. Spilman or for its postwar occupant (and Hunton's predecessor as owner) Confederate Colonel (and Virginia lawyer) John Singleton Mosby.

His autobiography (which he finished in 1904), originally only for family use and 100 copies of which were printed by his son in 1929, is a perspective on Virginia life in the 19th century.

== See also ==
- List of American Civil War generals (Confederate)

U.S. House of Representatives
| Preceded by William Terry | Member of the U.S. House of Representatives from Virginia's 8th congressional district March 4, 1873 – March 4, 1881 | Succeeded by John S. Barbour Jr. |
U.S. Senate
| Preceded by John S. Barbour Jr. | U.S. senator (Class 2) from Virginia; May 28, 1892 – March 4, 1895; Served alongside: John W. Daniel | Succeeded by Thomas S. Martin |
