= Richard Carter Scott =

American politician from Virginia (1859–1928)

Attorney General of Virginia
- In office August 11, 1897 – January 1, 1898
- Governor: Charles Triplett O'Ferrall
- Preceded by: R. Taylor Scott
- Succeeded by: Andrew Jackson Montague

Personal details
- Born: July 25, 1859 Warrenton, Virginia, U.S.
- Died: January 27, 1928 (aged 68) Richmond, Virginia, U.S.
- Party: Democratic
- Children: 4
- Education: University of Virginia

Richard Carter Scott (July 25, 1859 – January 27, 1928) was an American judge and politician who served as the Attorney General of Virginia as a member of the Democratic party from 1897 to 1898.

== Early life ==
Richard Carter Scott was born in Warrenton, Virginia on July 25, 1859, to Robert Taylor Scott (1834-1897) and Frances Scott (1838-1923). Scott graduated from the University of Virginia whereupon he went into banking, before becoming an attorney. Scott married Lucy Ellen Blair (1869-1953) on November 25, 1891, and went on to have four children.

== Political career and death ==
Upon the death of Richard Carter Scott's father, incumbent Attorney General of Virginia Robert Taylor Scott on August 5, 1897, Governor Charles Triplett O'Ferrall appointed Scott to complete the remainder of his late father's term on August 11, 1897. In 1904, Scott was elected judge of the Circuit Courts of Henrico County and the City of Richmond. Scott died in Richmond, Virginia on January 27, 1928.

Political offices
Preceded by R. Taylor Scott	Attorney General of Virginia; 1897-1898	Succeeded by Andrew Jackson Montague
