= Silas B. Hunton =

American politician

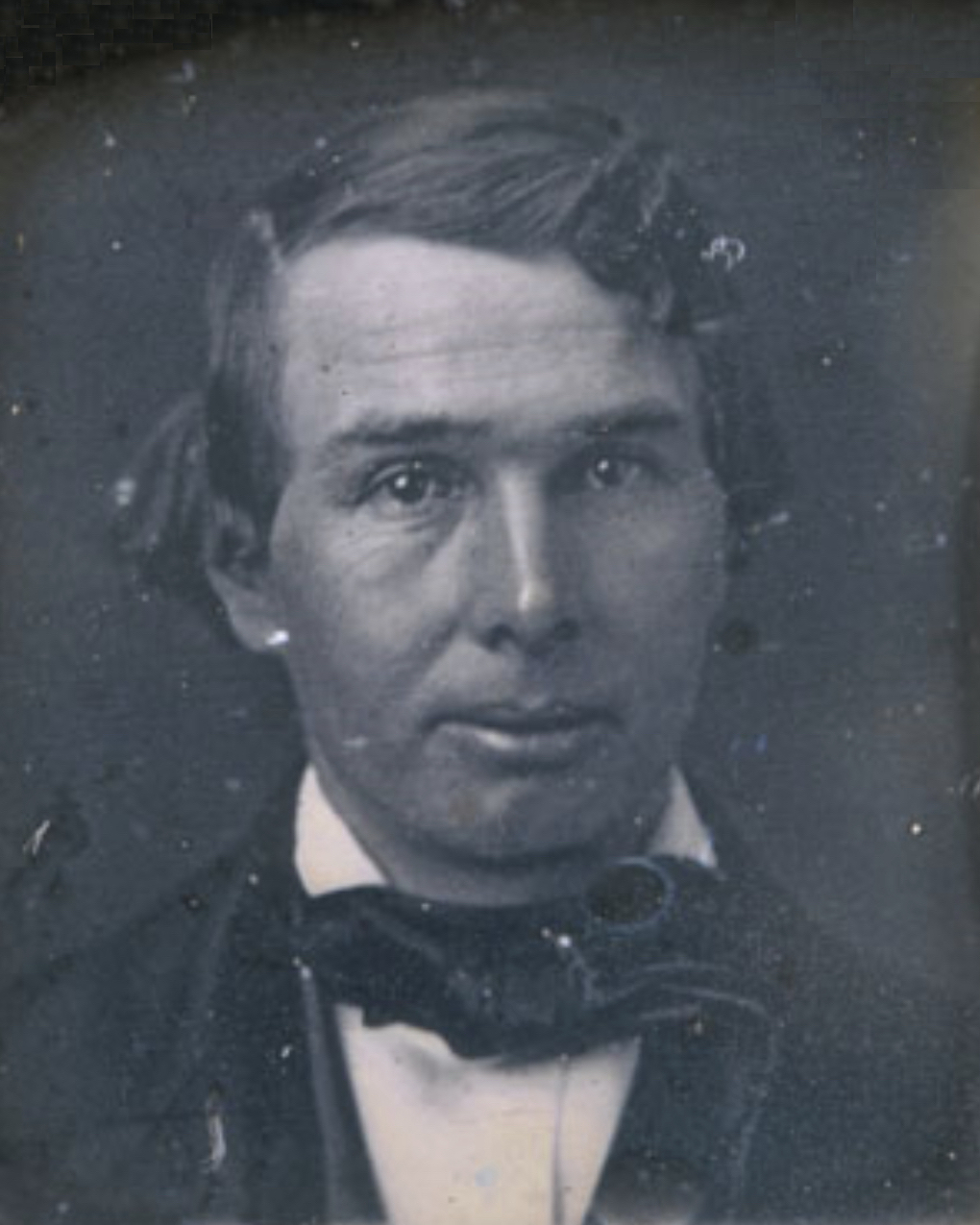
- Portrait of Hunton, c. 1852

Member of the Virginia House of Delegates from Fauquier County
- In office January 12, 1852 – December 5, 1853
- Preceded by: William M. Hume
- Succeeded by: Richard H. Carter

Personal details
- Born: Silas Brown Hunton; April 23, 1819 Warrenton, Virginia, U.S.
- Died: August 4, 1900 (aged 81) Warrenton, Virginia, U.S.
- Resting place: Mount Hope; 38°47′32.6″N 77°44′02″W
- Party: Democratic
- Spouse: Margaret Ann Rixey
- Parent: Eppa Hunton I (father)
- Relatives: Eppa Hunton II (brother)

Silas Brown Hunton (April 23, 1819 – August 4, 1900) was an American politician who served in the Virginia House of Delegates.
