= New Baltimore Historic District =

Historic district in Virginia, United States

- U.S. National Register of Historic Places
- U.S. Historic district
- Virginia Landmarks Register
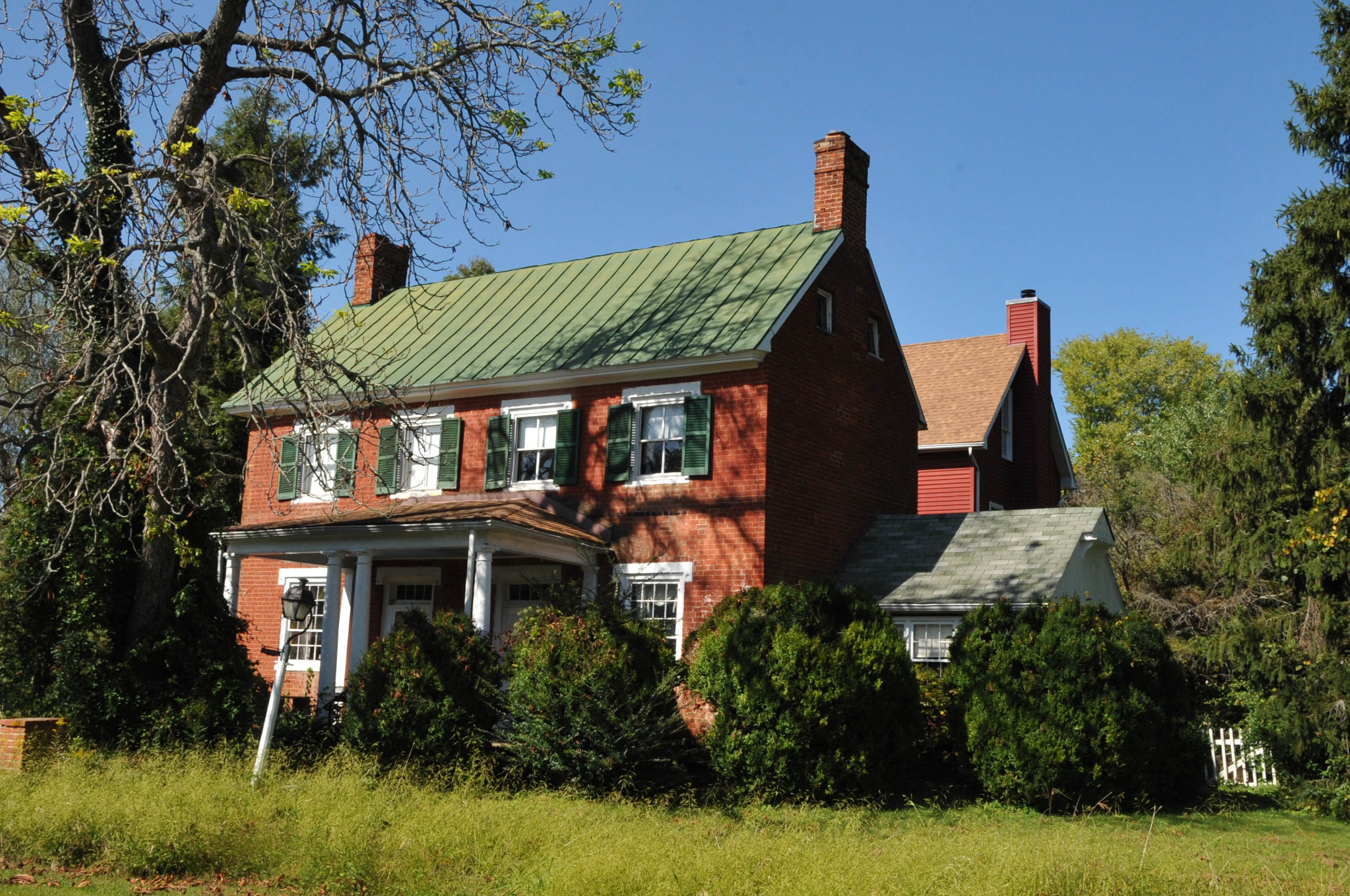
- James Hampton Tavern

- Location within Northern Virginia Location within Virginia Location within the United States
- Location: Area including parts of Old Alexandria Turnpike, Mason Ln., Georgetown Rd., and Beverley's Mill Rd., New Baltimore, Virginia
- Coordinates: 38°46′04″N 77°43′31″W
- Area: 88 acres (36 ha)
- Built: 1822
- Architectural style: Federal, Classical Revival, Bugalow/Craftsman
- NRHP reference No.: 04000044
- VLR No.: 030-5166

Significant dates
- Added to NRHP: February 11, 2004
- Designated VLR: December 3, 2003

New Baltimore Historic District is a national historic district located at New Baltimore, Fauquier County, Virginia. It encompasses 55 contributing buildings and 1 contributing structure in the rural village of New Baltimore. The majority of buildings in the district are dwellings, ranging in date from the 1820s to the mid-20th centuries. Notable buildings include the Federal style James Hampton's Tavern (c. 1823), Eastview (c. 1830), and the New Baltimore School (1915). The contributing structure is a one-lane bridge (c. 1920, 1937).

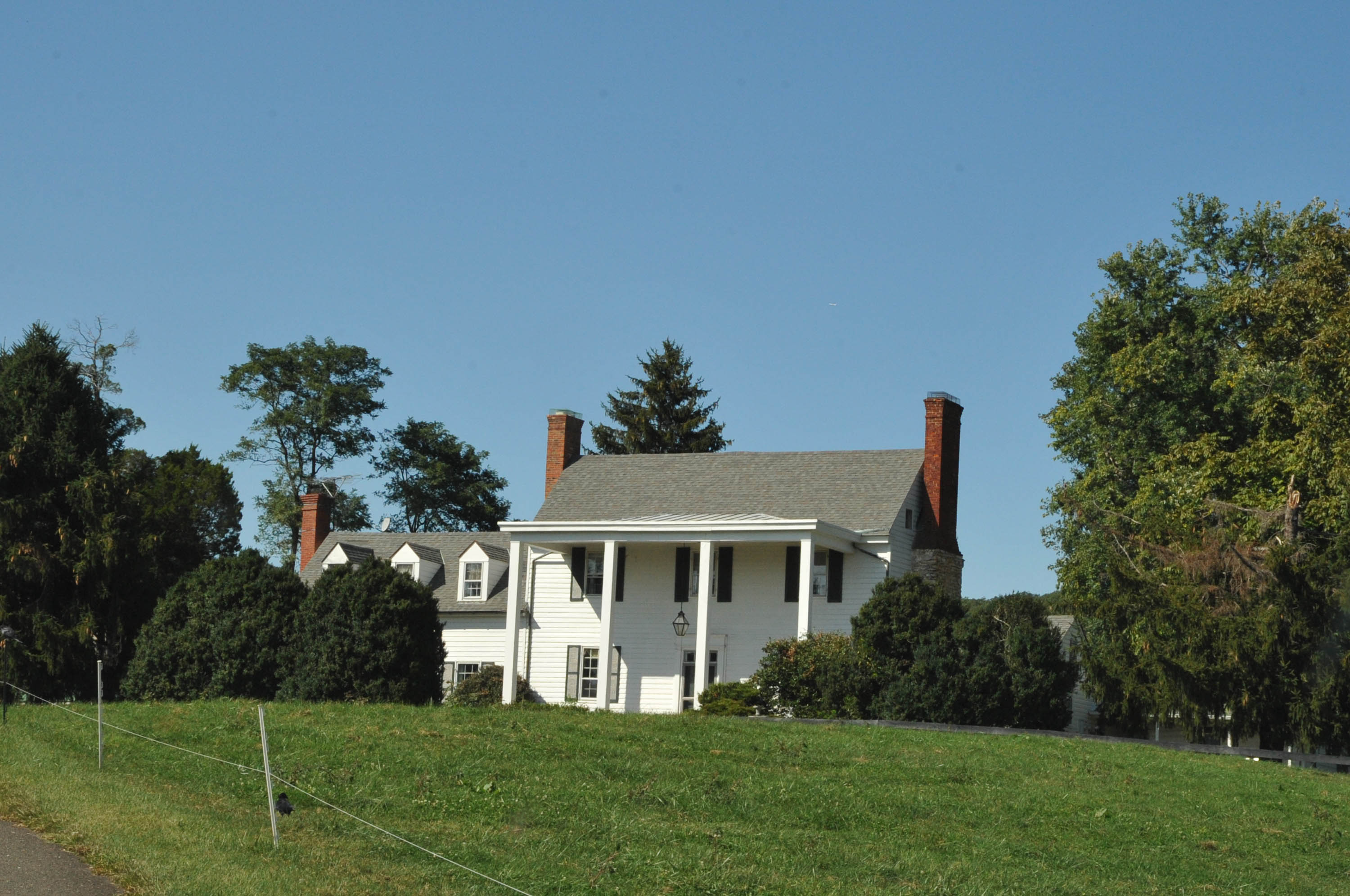
Fauquier Farm

It was listed on the National Register of Historic Places in 2004.
