= Manassas Peace Jubilee =

The Manassas Peace Jubilee was a celebration that began 50 years after the start of the American Civil War and was held in Manassas, Virginia, mostly between July 16 and July 21, 1911. This first major Civil War veterans' reunion marked fifty years after the First Battle of Bull Run, the first major conflict in what both sides originally thought would be a short war. Former Union officer turned Virginia lawyer and delegate George Carr Round and former Confederate officer and Lost Cause proponent Edmund Berkeley organized the event from Evergreen Manor House in nearby Haymarket, Virginia.

== Original 1911 event ==
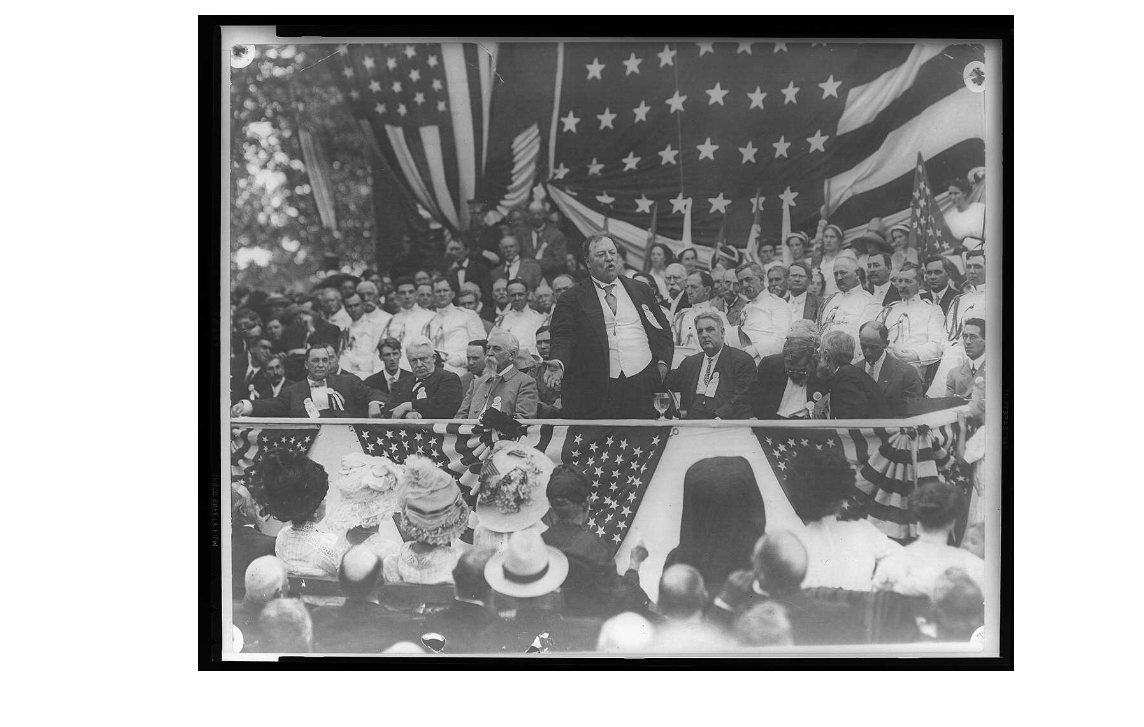
U.S. President William Howard Taft speaking at Manassas Court House. To his right sits Virginia Governor William Hodges Mann.

More than 500 aging veterans of both armies (about 350 of them former Confederates) participated in the week's events. Poems, prayers and songs celebrating peace were commissioned for the jubilee, including the "Manassas Peace Jubilee Anthem" by Mary Speed Jones Mercer. At precisely noon on July 21, on the original battleground, veterans of both armies advanced toward each other in lines, with outstretched arms rather than fixed bayonets. They shook hands and patted backs, as well as agreed the war had been a "misunderstanding" before consuming picnic basket lunches on the grounds of the once-contested Henry Hill, then reassembled on the courthouse lawn to listen to the speeches, and even later swapped stories across campfires.

The culmination of the Peace Jubilee featured President William Howard Taft (a young boy in Ohio when the war began) shaking the hand of Virginia governor William Hodges Mann, who dressed in gray and would be the last Confederate soldier to serve as the Commonwealth's governor. Although the Brooklyn chapter of the Grand Army of the Republic (GAR) had asked President Taft not to appear if the Confederate battle flag were to be unfurled, he (and many others) refused to stop the commemoration of the current union. The GAR's Commander-in-Chief, John E. Gilman of Massachusetts, sat next to former Confederate General George W. Gordon, and both responded warmly to the various welcome speeches. President Taft drove to the event in a newfangled steam-powered automobile despite several rain-swollen streams en route (which caused him to arrive several hours late, and which turned back several accompanying congressmen and members of the press). The speeches by Taft, Mann and U.S. Senator Thomas Staples Martin took place on the grounds of the then-relatively new Prince William County Courthouse, built on land Round had donated about two decades earlier.

Participants included:

- 48 Peace Jubilee Maidens
- Two U.S. cavalry troops from Ft. Myer
- Virginia militia, including the Warrenton Rifles and Front Royal Guard
- Fort Myer band
- Manassas orchestra

== Further Civil War reunions at Gettysburg ==
Two years later, veterans of both armies met again, this time about 50,000 men (22,000 from Pennsylvania alone, that state's legislature having set aside funds to pay railroad fares for all honorably discharged veterans) assembled at Gettysburg, Pennsylvania. The 1913 veterans re-enacted Pickett's Charge without armaments, then listened to a speech by President Woodrow Wilson. The event was far more successful than the same battle's 25th-anniversary commemoration, in which veterans of Pickett's Brigade met Union troops who had participated in the battle. The entire reunion was notably peaceful and full of good cheer. Some aging veterans' departure from the Gettysburg Hotel's dining room at the conclusion ended quickly, when seven men were stabbed and many bottles thrown after a former Union veteran overheard negative remarks about the late President Abraham Lincoln.

While many state chapters of both the United Confederate Veterans and the Grand Army of the Republic held reunions in the 1930s, the last major Civil War reunion again occurred at Gettysburg, Pennsylvania, in July 1938, that battle's 75th anniversary and two years after successful organization of Manassas National Battlefield Park and the re-enactment described below. About 1,845 veterans (the majority of them from the Union Army) gathered. President Franklin Delano Roosevelt delivered a speech and lit the Eternal Light Peace Memorial, proclaiming the old men (many 90 years old and dressed in their old uniforms) "stand together under one flag now." The veterans also cheered the display of modern tanks rolling across the battlefield, as well as fighter aircraft overhead. Despite health precautions, five veterans died during that reunion, and six more shortly after returning home.

== Further peace events around Manassas ==
A monument commemorating the Manassas Peace Jubilee was erected on the Prince William County courthouse's lawn on September 30, 1915, including two cannons as well as two anchors and 3 fathoms of chain apiece donated by then assistant secretary of the U.S. Navy Franklin D. Roosevelt. The 75th anniversary of the First Battle of Bull Run was marked during Roosevelt's presidency in 1936 by a re-enactment of the battle featuring modern soldiers and marines, and watched by an unexpectedly large crowd of about 31,000 people. In 1951, a frieze was unveiled in the Rotunda of the U.S. Capitol in Washington, D.C. which depicts Union and Confederate soldiers shaking hands, a theme of the Manassas Peace Jubilee, as well as many historic markers in other locales during the previous decades. The Manassas Historical and Museum Commission held a celebration of the Peace Jubilee's 75th anniversary in 1986. Another peace commemoration at Manassas was held in July 2011, featuring a re-enactment of the peace maidens, as well as the speeches of Lt. Col. Berkeley and Sen. Martin.

== See also ==
- First Battle of Bull Run
- United Confederate Veterans
- Grand Army of the Republic
- 1913 Gettysburg reunion
- Manassas National Battlefield Park
- Gettysburg Battlefield
