= George Carr Round =

American politician

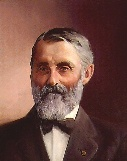

Member of the Virginia House of Delegates from the Prince William County, Virginia district
- In office January 1, 1874 – November 30, 1875
- Preceded by: Benjamin F. Lewis
- Succeeded by: James R. Purcell

Personal details
- Born: September 4, 1839 Warrenton, Virginia, US
- Died: November 5, 1918 (aged 79) Manassas, Virginia, US
- Spouse: E
- Education: Wesleyan University, Columbia Law School
- Profession: Lawyer, politician

Military service
- Allegiance: United States
- Branch/service: U.S. Army
- Years of service: 1861–1865
- Rank: 2nd lieutenant
- Unit: 1st Connecticut Artillery (1861–1864); U.S. Army Signal Corps (1864–1865)

George Carr Round (September 14, 1839 – November 5, 1918) was a Union soldier (and later officer) who settled in Prince William County, Virginia after the American Civil War. He became a lawyer, superintendent of public instruction in Manassas, as well as served a single term in the Virginia General Assembly. Round became known nationally in his lifetime for organizing the Manassas Peace Jubilee in 1911, alongside fellow one-term delegate Edmund C. Berkeley (a former Confederate officer), and decades after his death for contributing to the creation of Manassas National Battlefield Park. Round also held several local offices, donated the land for a more-accessible courthouse, organized the first public schools in the area and secured funding for the county's first public library.

== Early life and education ==
Born at Kingston, Pennsylvania, to former schoolteacher Sarah Ann Carr and her husband, Methodist minister William Round. His grandfather, Bartram Round, has served as a lieutenant of Connecticut troops in the American Revolutionary War known as the "Scituate Hunters", and Round could trace his ancestry to colonists emigrating on the Mayflower. His birth family included an elder half-sister, Sarah Mehetabel Round, brother Rev. John E. Round and a sister Lydia Adelia Round Pine. The senior Rev. Round accepted positions at several churches in Pennsylvania and New York, but George Round grew up in Windsor, New York (on the Pennsylvania border), and attended the Windsor Academy, a collegiate preparatory school. In 1858 he began studies at Wesleyan University in Middletown, Connecticut, but interrupted them in his junior year in order to enlist in the First Connecticut Volunteers.

== American Civil War ==
As the Civil War began, Round interrupted his studies (which had included voluntary military drills) to enlist in the First Connecticut Artillery, although he later noted that the favorite uncle (after whom he had been named) had long been a teacher in Georgia and the Carolinas, and his boys had volunteered for Confederate service much as George Round and his brother had volunteered for the Union Army. His elder brother, Rev. John Emory Round, enlisted as a captain in Company K of the 43rd Massachusetts Infantry and served nearly a year before being mustered out on July 30, 1863.

Round spent most of his military service in North Carolina. After three years Round transferred to the U.S. Army Signal Corps and was promoted to officer, accepting a commission as lieutenant. Round later described how he sent the last signal of the war, climbing the dome of the North Carolina state capital at Raleigh pursuant to orders of General William T. Sherman to establish a signal station (that had caused local consternation when he used black flags to note President Lincoln's assassination). Round used colorful signal rockets to transmit the message "On earth peace, good will toward men" upon hearing confirmation of the war's end.

== Postwar ==
=== Education ===
Following the conflict, Round returned to Connecticut and resumed his studies. He became a member of Alpha Delta Phi and Phi Beta Kappa, and graduated from Wesleyan University in 1865. Round then enrolled at Columbia Law School in New York City, and graduated.

=== Lawyer and civic official ===
Following admission to the New York bar in 1868, Round practiced law for about a year with a New York firm before moving southward, expecting to visit relatives in North Carolina. He appreciated the Southern hospitality he had received despite being a Northern soldier, and wanted to help rebuild after the war's devastation. In particular, Round helped rebuild Manassas, Virginia, whose good railroad connections had led to the important First Battle of Bull Run (a.k.a. First Manassas) in July 1862 and Second Battle of Bull Run (a.k.a. Second Manassas) the following year, but its population had shrunk by half by the time Round arrived. Round settled in Manassas, then married a Canadian woman who had also arrived with her parents, and they ultimately raised their own family as discussed below. His parents and sister all moved to either to Manassas (where they were buried) or to Washington, D.C. (a short train ride away and from whose public schools the new Manassas public school discussed below bought some furnishings).

In order to be re-admitted to the Union, Virginia needed to adopt a new state Constitution because the 1850 constitution explicitly permitted slavery. The Virginia Constitutional Convention of 1868 proposed a document, which was controversial because of its provisions which excluded former Confederates. Even Union authorities delayed the vote until mid-1869, and those controversial provisions were voted on separately and did not pass, unlike the document as a whole.

Round opened a law and real estate office in Manassas on New Year's Day, 1869. The military government soon named him as Prince William County's commonwealth's attorney (prosecutor). Following Virginia's adoption of a new constitution forbidding slavery and readmission to the union, that position again became elective. However, in 1870, Round lost the election to become the county's prosecutor to James F. Clark, who resigned circa 1872, and was succeeded by Charles E. Sinclair (who had served in both houses of the Virginia General Assembly and would become a judge). Round also served on Manassas' first town council (1873), as the town clerk (from 1873 until 1873, when he was replaced by Robert C. Weir, who had been the town's first mayor and would serve intermittently for decades in various offices), and on the school board (1870–1912). Round also held federal positions, first as postmaster, then as federal tax commissioner (1875–1881).

=== Schools ===
The new Virginia constitution (adopted in mid-1869) established the state's first public school system, although funding would become a recurrent issue. By the year's close, Round established the county's first public school (for white children) in the rear room of the Asbury Methodist Episcopal Church (with Miss Estelle Green as teacher). It expanded to a second room the following year as the new school board (with Round as one of 3 members) also hired George Bennett as principal and teacher. In 1872, the new school board built the Ruffner building (named after Virginia's first superintendent of public instruction), which allowed the white school to leave the church. $300 of the money needed to construct a new building would come from the Peabody Education Fund, with the remaining $694.24 from local subscriptions as well as donations from other northerners; Quakers established the Brown school, a.k.a. Manassas Village Colored School in 1870. By 1900 the village had six schools for white children and four for black children. As the town continued to grow, Round helped secure financing (including from Andrew Carnegie) for the Bennett building in 1909.

=== Legislator and continued civic activist ===
In 1874, Prince William County voters elected Round as their delegate to the Virginia General Assembly (a part-time position). He succeeded lifetime resident (and delegate to the Virginia Constitutional Convention of 1868 but single-term Delegate) Benjamin F. Lewis (1816–1878), son of William Montgomery Lewis (1793–1867). Although (or because) Round proposed legislation to establish teacher training colleges across Virginia, he was not re-elected. Confederate veteran and farmer James R. Purcell succeeded him (again for one term).

Nonetheless, Round stayed in the area, and became a booster—planting shade trees along Manassas' streets, donating land to build the county courthouse in Manassas (after considerable controversy it moved for the fourth time westward, from centrally located Brentsville, which lacked railroad access) and helped preserve historic Bel Air mansion. Round also donated land for sisters Fannie and Eugenia Osbourn to establish their higher school which became the Manassas Institute (the county's first high school) in 1906, two years before the state-mandated free public high school education. Round also helped Manassas host the 8th district teacher training college. It added courses in agriculture, domestic science, teacher training and even commerce in 1915 similar to those offered African American children at the private Manassas Industrial School for Colored Youth founded by Jennie Dean two decades earlier (on whose board Round also sat, and served as its legal advisor). The "Ruffner School and Manassas High School" Building would close in 1926, when overcrowding threatened its state accreditation so a new brick Osbourn High School was built and named after the early teachers. Round also served as president of the Virginia School Trustee Association in 1906, and helped establish an agricultural extension service for Prince William county. He also helped establish the local Manasseh Lodge of Masons in 1875, and served as its first secretary.

=== Veterans activist ===
After the war Round became involved in veterans activities, eventually becoming president of the U.S. Signal Corps Association. Round was also active in veterans' activities to reconcile with former Confederates. He collaborated with former Confederate officer Edmund Berkeley (who also once represented Prince William as delegate in the Virginia General Assembly of 1891–1892) as well as Dr. Henry M. Clarkson and bankers Westwood Hutchison and G. Raymond Ratcliffe. Round spent years trying to create a national park around the monuments being erected on the Manassas battlefield, while maintaining much of the farmland (for productive agricultural use also increased historical accuracy). Round helped secure U.S. Army maneuvers in the area amid the efforts of local boosters in September 1904, and also worked to re-enact both the First Battle of Manassas and Second Battle of Manassas, although both were Union defeats. Congressman John F. Rixey, a Virginia Confederate veteran, sponsored a bill to create a study commission concerning the battlefield park but died unexpectedly in 1907. Round and Berkeley then conceived and organized the Manassas Peace Jubilee, also known as the "Reunion of the Blue and the Gray," which culminated on June 21, 1911, with a gun-free battle re-enactment and speeches by U.S. President William Howard Taft and Virginia Governor (and Confederate veteran) William Hodges Mann. Rixey's successor Charles Carlin (son of a Confederate veteran) secured passage of the battlefield park investigative commission bill in 1912, but by the time the three commissioners recommended purchase, World War I had begun.

== Personal life ==
Round married Emily Bennett in Manassas in 1877. Although she was born in London, Ontario, she likewise moved to Manassas (with her parents Charles and Cathering Maitland Bennett) in 1869. Emily Round became respected for helping found the town's Bethlehem Club, serving as president of its Woman's Christian Temperance Union chapter, work with Trinity Episcopal Church, and would become the town's oldest citizen by the time of her death. Three daughters and two sons would survive infancy—Norma Round Davies (1878–1981), Ruth Althea Round Hoof, Lt. Roswell Emory Round, Emily Round Lewis, and George Charles Round. Their son and William Maitland Round died as infants in the 1880s.

== Death and legacy ==
Round died at his Manassas home in 1918, survived by his wife, children and grandchildren. Rev. Alex. Stuart Gibson conducted his funeral at Trinity Episcopal Church (in which Round was active later in his life). Round was buried later that afternoon at Arlington National Cemetery, as would his grandson, Brig. Gen. Roswell Emory Round Jr. in 2017. The Manassas Battlefield Park was created during the Great Depression by the National Park Service and the Works Progress Administration, and even larger than Round had hoped during his lifetime, including the most historic areas associated with both battles. The Manassas Museum has his papers. In 1986, the Manassas School Board built a new elementary school and named it to honor Round.
