= Mount Hope (New Baltimore, Virginia) =

Historic house in Virginia, United States

- U.S. National Register of Historic Places
- Virginia Landmarks Register
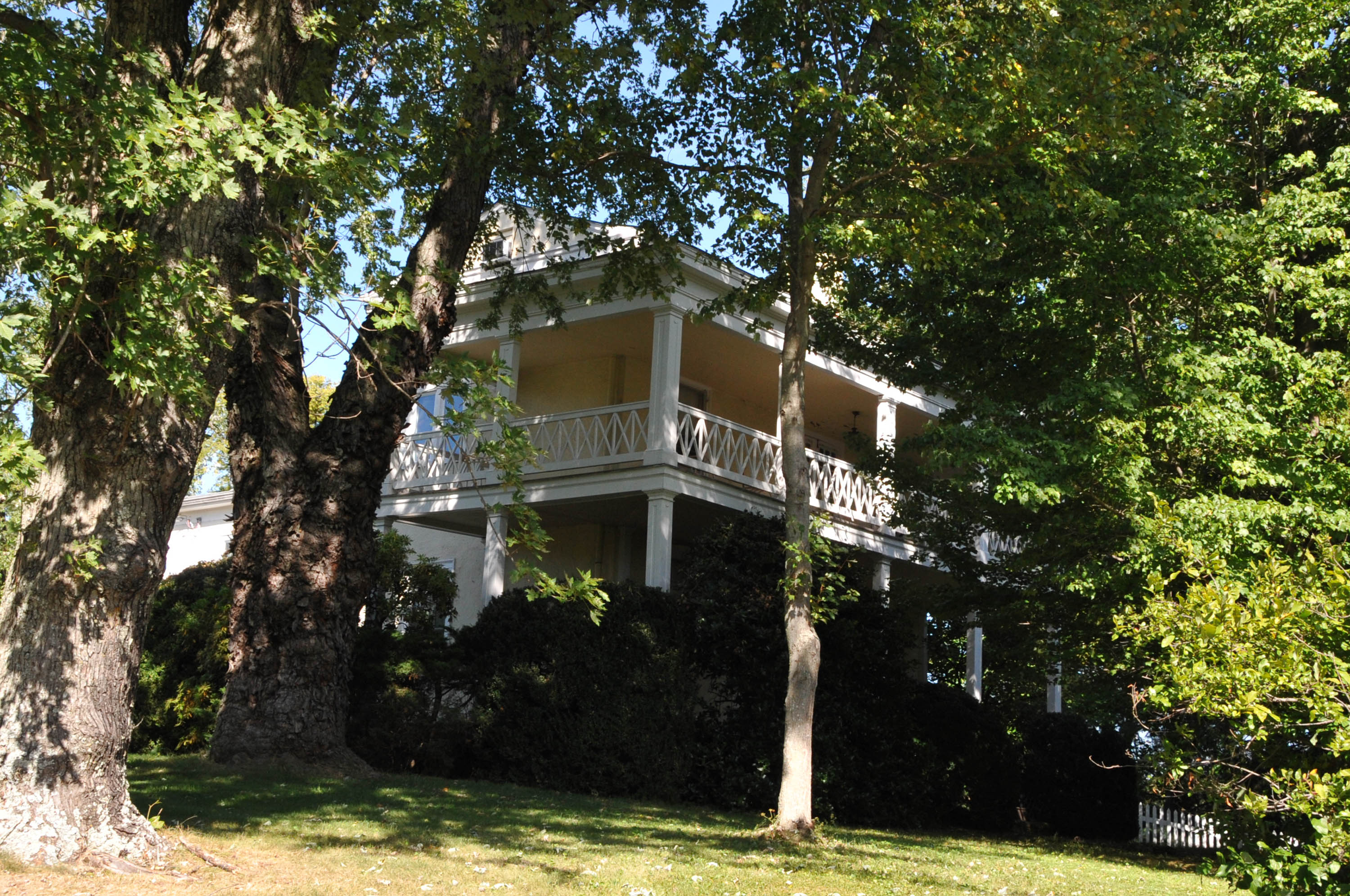

- Location within Northern Virginia Location within Virginia Location within the United States
- Location: 6015 Georgetown Rd., near New Baltimore, Virginia
- Coordinates: 38°47′30″N 77°44′02″W
- Area: 10 acres (4.0 ha)
- Built: 1829
- Architectural style: Greek Revival
- NRHP reference No.: 05001625
- VLR No.: 030-0778

Significant dates
- Added to NRHP: February 1, 2006
- Designated VLR: December 7, 2005

Mount Hope is a historic home located near New Baltimore, Fauquier County, Virginia. The house was built in four periods from the early-19th to early-20th centuries. The main dwelling is a 2 ½-story, three-bay, frame dwelling on a stone foundation and in the Greek Revival style. It features a double-story porch with a hipped roof and square wooden columns. Also on the property are the contributing bank barn, a machine shed, a smokehouse, and a spring house dating from the 19th century; an early-20th-century shed; a well; and the Hunton Family cemetery.

It was listed on the National Register of Historic Places in 2006.
