= 8th Virginia Infantry Regiment =

- Flag of Virginia
- Active: May 1861 to April 1865
- Country: Confederate States of America
- Allegiance: Confederate
- Branch: Confederate States Army
- Type: Infantry regiment
- Size: 10 companies
- Stars and Bars
- Engagements: First Bull Run; Battle of Ball's Bluff; Battle of Williamsburg; Battle of Fair Oaks; Battle of Gaines Mill; Battle of Malvern Hill; Second Battle of Bull Run; Battle of Ox Hill; Battle of Boonsboro; Battle of Antietam; Battle of Fredericksburg; Battle of Gettysburg; Battle of Cold Harbor; Battle of Five Forks; Battle of Sailor's Creek

Commanders
- 1st: Eppa Hunton
- 2nd: Norborne Berkeley

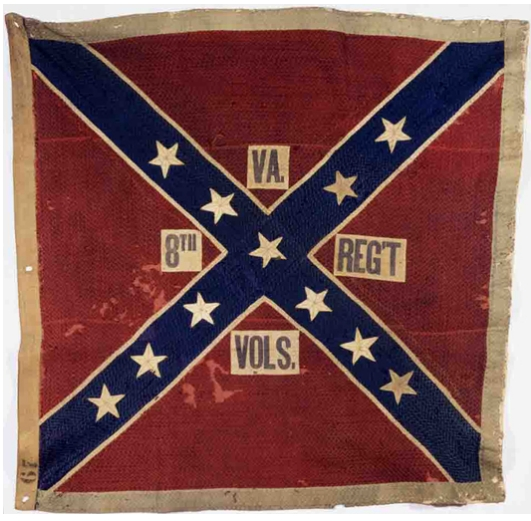
Battle flag of the "Bloody Eighth"

The 8th Virginia Infantry Regiment was a Confederate infantry regiment raised by Colonel Eppa Hunton in Leesburg, Virginia on May 8, 1861. The unit comprised six companies from Loudoun, two companies from Fauquier, one company from Fairfax and one company from Prince William. Initial regimental officers included: Lt. Colonel Charles B. Tebbs, Major Norborne Berkeley, John M. Orr - Quartermaster, Dr. Richard H. Edwards - Surgeon, Charles F. Linthicum - Chaplain. After Eppa Hunton's promotion to brigadier general in August 1863, in part based on his valor during the Battle of Gettysburg, particularly during Pickett's Charge (although the regiment suffered 90% casualties, either wounded like Hunton, killed or missing), Norborne Berkeley was promoted to command the 8th Virginia, and his brother Edmund became the Lieut. Colonel, his brother William Berkeley, Major, and Charles Berkeley became the senior Captain of what then became known as the "Berkeley Regiment." Nonetheless, Norborne, William and Charles Berkeley were all in Union prisoner of war camps and their brother Edmund still recovering from his Gettysburg wound on August 9.

== History ==
In May 1861, the Governor of Virginia, John Letcher, granted Eppa Hunton the commission of Colonel and ordered him to raise an infantry regiment from the northern Virginia area. Before the Battle of First Bull Run, the newly raised 8th Virginia was assigned to guard the numerous Potomac River crossings in Loudoun County, from which it had drawn four companies. The regiment fought in that battle to particular acclaim (suffering 30 casualties out of 450 effectives) and then returned to Leesburg, where they were engaged in the Battle of Ball's Bluff in October 1861 (suffering 43 wounded of the 375 engaged).

In March 1862 the 8th was ordered to leave Loudoun to participate in the Peninsula Campaign as part of Pickett's Brigade. Lt. Col. Tebbs, who had been Loudoun's Commonwealth Attorney before the war and captain of the Loudoun Guards and secession advocate, relinquished his commission in April and took a civilian job with the Confederate States government in Richmond. After a valiant charge at the Battle of Gaines' Mill in June (one of the Seven Days Battles in which the unit lost a total of 10 killed and 66 wounded), Col. Hunton referred to his men, who he felt would go against any odds seemingly without counting the cost, as The Bloody Eighth, a term he would use from then on.

In September 1862, the 8th briefly returned to Leesburg, following the Battle of Second Bull Run, in which they participated although initially in reserve status, on their way to the Maryland Campaign. The following year, they took part in Pickett's Charge during the Battle of Gettysburg—they sustained 90% casualties, and only one officer (Charles Berkeley) and eleven men remained uninjured. Col. Hunton was promoted to Brigadier General the following month, and the regiment became known as the "Berkeley Regiment," since Norborne Berkeley was promoted to command it, his brother Edmund became the Lieut. Colonel, with his brother William Berkeley as regimental Major, and brother Charles Berkeley as the senior Captain.

The 8th Virginia remained with the Army of Northern Virginia throughout the remainder of the war, taking part (although in decreasing numbers) in the Overland Campaign, Richmond-Petersburg Campaign and the Appomattox Campaign. It reported 53 casualties between June 1 and December 31, 1864, including the popular former chaplain turned adjutant, Charles Linthicum, a Methodist minister from Frederick County, Maryland who initially joined to substitute for a member of his congregation who had a large family. On April 6, 1865, the majority of the regiment was killed or surrendered at the Battle of Sayler's Creek, including Gen. Hunton. The surgeon and eleven privates who escaped that battle were paroled 3 days later following Robert E. Lee's surrender at Appomattox Courthouse.

== Companies ==
- A - Loudoun County - "Hillsboro Border Guards"; accepted into state service 19 Apr 1861; commanded by Captain N. R. Heaton (1861-1862), Captain William R. Bissell (1862-1863)
- B - Fauquier County - "Piedmont Rifles"; enlisted 17 May 1861, at Rectortown; Captain Richard H Carter
- C - "Evergreen Guards" — Prince William County: Formed May 8, 1861; commanded by Captain Edmund Berkeley (1861–1863), Captain Robert H. Tyler (1863–1865)
- D - Loudoun County - "Champe Rifles"; enlisted 13 May 1861, at Haymarket; Captain William N Berkeley
- E - Loudoun County - "Hampton's Company"; enlisted 29 May 1861, at Philomont; Captain Mandley Hampton
- F - "Blue Mountain Boys" — Loudoun County; enlisted 19 Jun 1861, at Bloomfield; Captain Alex Grayson
- G - Fairfax County - "Thrift's Company"; enlisted 22 Jun 1861, at Dranesville; mustered into service 16 Jul 1861; Captain James Thrift
- H - Loudoun County - "Potomac Grays"; enlisted 13 Jul 1861, at Leesburg; Captain J. Morris Wampler
- I - Loudoun County - "Simpson's Company"; enlisted 13 Jul 1861, at Mt. Gilead-North Fork; Captain James Simpson
- K - Fauquier County - "Scott's Company": Formed July 30, 1861; 109 men, Captain Robert T. Scott commanding

== See also ==
- List of Virginia Civil War units
