= New Baltimore, Virginia =

- Census-designated place
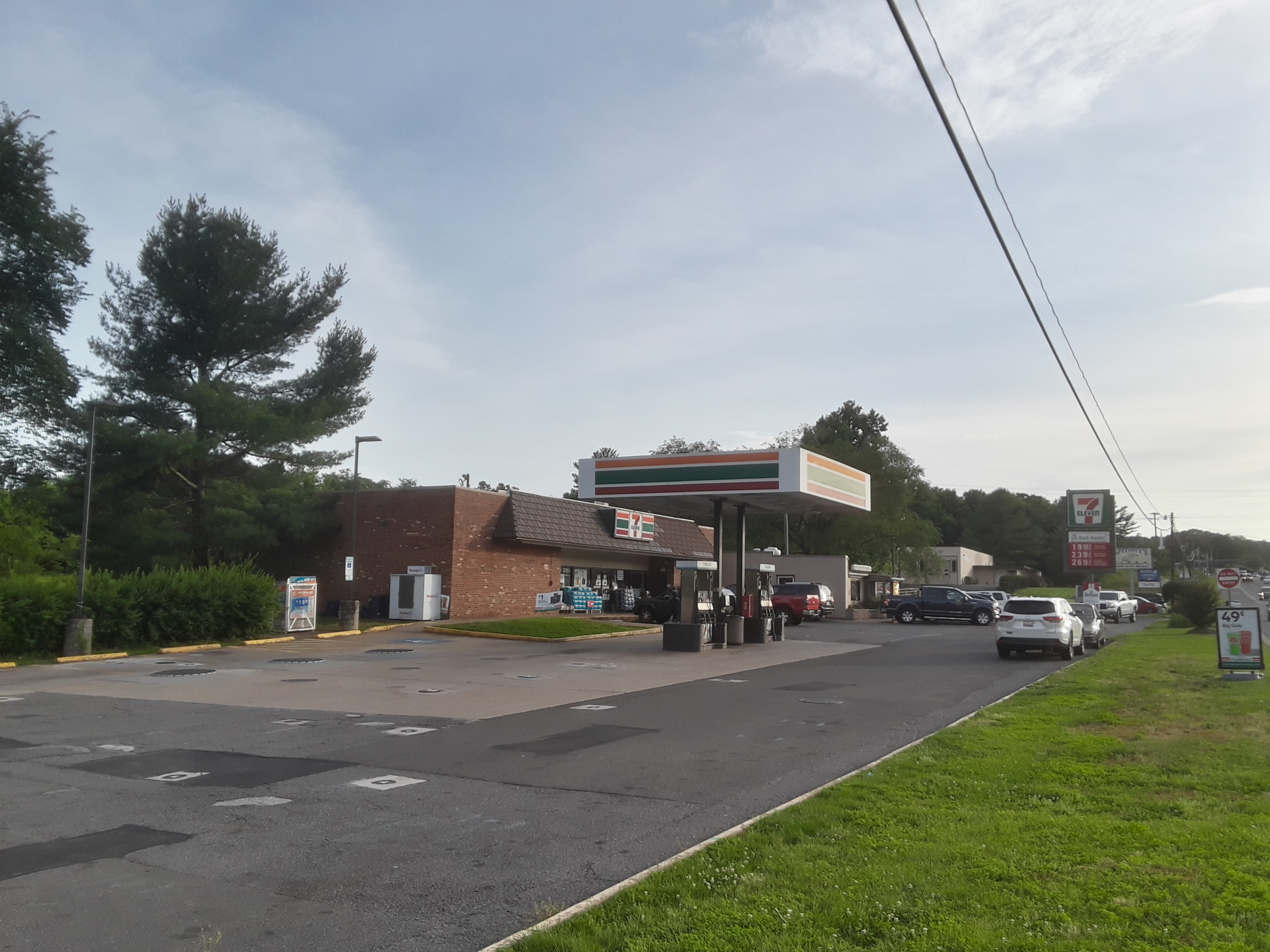
- Commercial area along US 29 in New Baltimore

- Location within Northern Virginia Location within Virginia Location within the United States
- Coordinates: 38°46′02″N 77°43′42″W
- Country: United States
- State: Virginia
- County: Fauquier

Area
  - Total: 12.3 sq mi (31.8 km^{2})
  - Land: 12.0 sq mi (31.1 km^{2})
  - Water: 0.27 sq mi (0.7 km^{2})
- Elevation: 495 ft (151 m)

Population (2010)
  - Total: 11,251
  - Density: 676/sq mi (261.1/km^{2})
- Time zone: UTC−5 (Eastern (EST))
  - Summer (DST): UTC−4 (EDT)
- ZIP code: 20187
- FIPS code: 51-55528
- GNIS feature ID: 1499792

New Baltimore is an unincorporated community and census-designated place (CDP) in eastern Fauquier County, Virginia, United States. As of the 2020 census, New Baltimore had a population of 11,251. The community has existed since the early 19th century, but it has had its most significant growth since the 1980s. It is the portion of Fauquier County with the easiest access to Washington, D.C., and as a result, many people who live in New Baltimore commute into DC. Other major communities close to New Baltimore are Warrenton, the Gainesville/Haymarket area, and Manassas. The area officially considered to be New Baltimore expanded significantly in 2006 with Fauquier County's designation of service districts, of which New Baltimore is one. The service district designation provides added access to utilities, such as water and sewer, and targets the area for growth.

== History ==
Given that it sat aside the turnpike connecting Warrenton and Alexandria, and near Warrenton, the county seat, was a commercial crossroads of military importance, control of the village changed hands a number of times during the war. Several skirmishes and battles took place in and near the village during the Civil War, including the Battle of Brandy Station, First and Second Battles of Bull Run, and Battle of Cedar Mountain. Warrenton, four miles south, included a railroad branch line terminus and it changed hands 67 times during the War.

Following the Battle of Antietam, President Lincoln was frustrated that Gen. McClellan had again failed to destroy Lee's army. He officially ordered that he be removed from command on November 5, 1862. McClellan's headquarters was in the front yard of the New Baltimore home and farm of Julia F. Claggett along the Alexandria Turnpike and Georgetown Road. McClellan visited troops to bid them farewell. Columbia Claggett, Julia Claggett's daughter-in-law, testified that a "parade and transfer of the Army to Gen. Burnside took place on our farm in front of our house in a change of command ceremony at New Baltimore, Virginia on November 9, 1862."

A brigade of General William B. Franklin's VI Corps, totaling about 3,000 troops, camped on the Claggett's 273 acres (110 ha) farm during the fall of 1862. The soldiers appropriated food stores and supplies, seized horses, hogs, and cattle, cut down 40 acres (16 ha) of woodland, tore down barns and fences for fuel and torched what remained. She filed a claim valued at $7,322.50 ($196,779 in 2025) with the Southern Claims Commission in 1871. They allowed her only $3,091 ($83,071), and she was forced to sell the farm at a loss to her deceased husband's cousin. The Corp later received some supplies from the Gainesville depot.

Later in the war the second brigade of the 27th New York Volunteer Infantry commanded by General Joseph Jackson Bartlett was encamped in New Baltimore from July 31, 1863, through September 15, 1863. On September 4, Confederate Captain Frank Stringfellow led 20 soldiers in a raid in an attempt to capture Bartlett whose headquarters were in Claggett's door yard. They fired a number of rounds at Union troops and into the home but were unsuccessful.

The original New Baltimore is northwest of and slightly off the highway from what is now part of the New Baltimore CDP. The early 19th century community of New Baltimore was an incorporated town dependent on what was then known as Alexandria Turnpike, now known as Lee Highway, which went through the village. This community had an Episcopal church as well as a Baptist church founded in 1762. In the 1850s New Baltimore was a post village with a church and a school. Its postmaster's salary was $19 in 1870.

The U.S. Post Office listed it in 1897, but not in 1908. Between those dates, Lee Highway was routed to the south of New Baltimore, so the town became just an enclave of houses from varying periods. The original central point of the town, James Hampton's Tavern (built 1823), still stands at the intersection of Old Alexandria Turnpike and Georgetown Road, and is currently a private residence. The New Baltimore Historic District was listed on the National Register of Historic Places in 2004.

== Geography ==
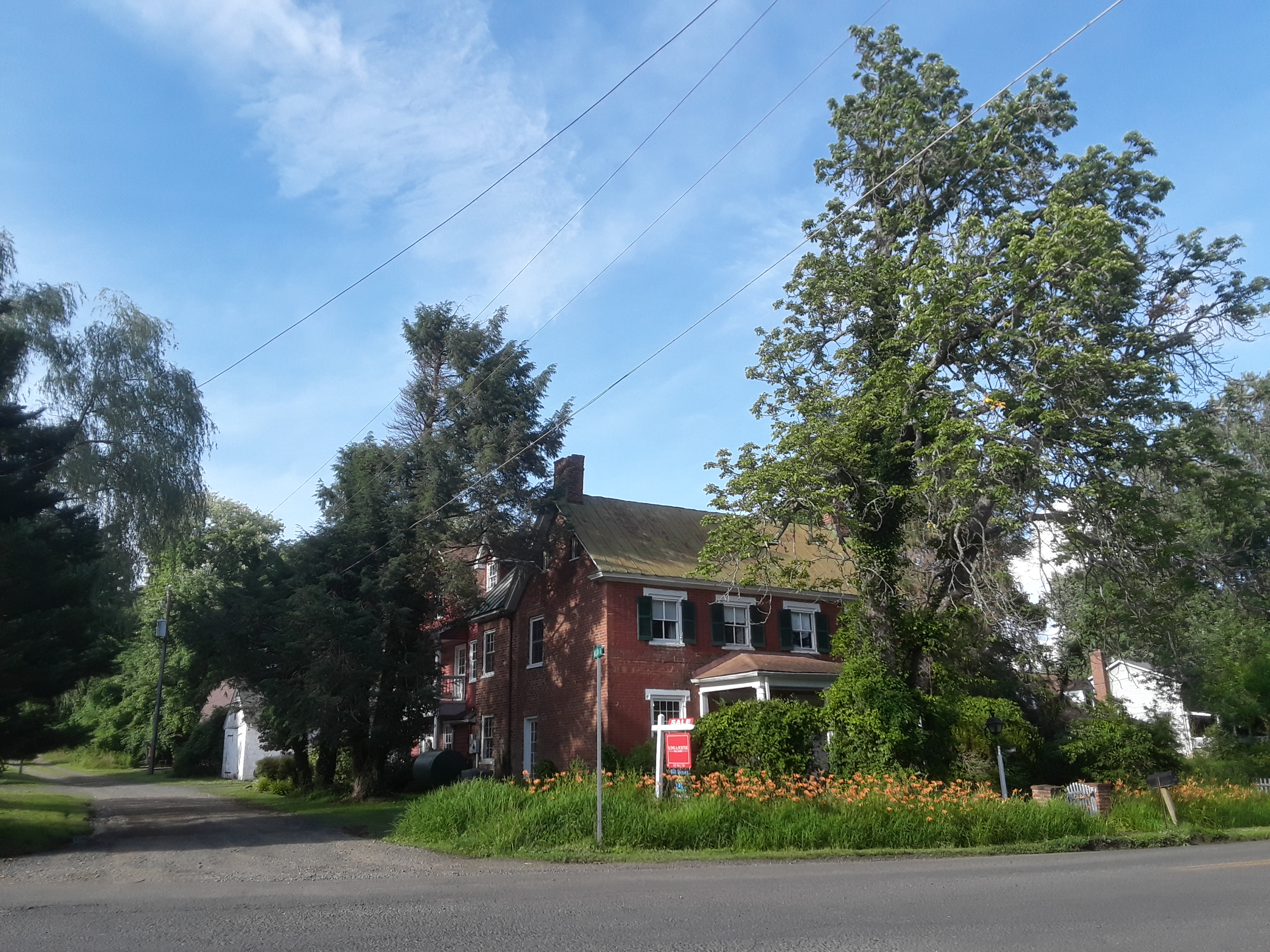
The former James Hampton Tavern, part of the New Baltimore Historic District

New Baltimore is 2 miles (3 km) southwest of the border between Prince William County and Fauquier County. It is 1 mile (1.6 km) north of Broken Hill, 6 miles (10 km) northeast of Warrenton, the Fauquier County seat, and 6 miles (10 km) west of Gainesville.

The major road in the community remains Lee Highway, U.S. routes 15 and 29. Another important road is Beverley's Mill Road / Broad Run Church Road (County Route 600), which is technically a secondary road, but has become a well-traveled commuter road.

The New Baltimore CDP now extends well south and east of the original settlement. The CDP border follows US 15/29 east to Riley Road, then south to Broad Run Church Road, then east to Vint Hill Road (Virginia State Route 215), then southeast to the Prince William County line. Following the county line southeast, the CDP border briefly turns south along an intermittent brook, then turns southwest on Rogues Road to Dumfries Road, turning northwest back to US 15 and 29 less than one mile northeast of the Warrenton town limits. The CDP limits turn northeastward along US 15/29, then north on Mill Run to Rosedale Farm Road, then west on Old Bust Head Road, north along lot lines to Snow Mountain Road, east back to Old Bust Head Road, east further to Georgetown Road, then east and south along lot lines around the original New Baltimore back to US 15/29. The CDP limits include the former Vint Hill Farms Station military site.

According to the U.S. Census Bureau, the current New Baltimore CDP has a total area of 12.3 square miles (31.8 km^{2}), of which 12.0 square miles (31.1 km^{2}) is land and 0.3 square miles (0.7 km^{2}), or 2.07%, is water. The community is part of the Cedar Run and Broad Run watersheds, which join to form the Occoquan River, a tributary of the Potomac.

== Demographics ==
Historical population
Census	Pop.	Note	%±
2010	8,119		—
2020	11,251		38.6%
U.S. Decennial Census; 2010 2020

New Baltimore was first listed as a census designated place in the 2010 U.S. census.

=== 2020 census ===
As of the 2020 census, New Baltimore had a population of 11,251. The median age was 39.6 years. 27.6% of residents were under the age of 18 and 13.6% of residents were 65 years of age or older. For every 100 females there were 99.6 males, and for every 100 females age 18 and over there were 99.0 males age 18 and over.

85.5% of residents lived in urban areas, while 14.5% lived in rural areas.

There were 3,551 households in New Baltimore, of which 43.1% had children under the age of 18 living in them. Of all households, 75.1% were married-couple households, 9.1% were households with a male householder and no spouse or partner present, and 13.3% were households with a female householder and no spouse or partner present. About 11.8% of all households were made up of individuals and 6.8% had someone living alone who was 65 years of age or older.

There were 3,627 housing units, of which 2.1% were vacant. The homeowner vacancy rate was 0.3% and the rental vacancy rate was 4.4%.

Racial composition as of the 2020 census
Race	Number	Percent
White	9,277	82.5%
Black or African American	457	4.1%
American Indian and Alaska Native	30	0.3%
Asian	268	2.4%
Native Hawaiian and Other Pacific Islander	11	0.1%
Some other race	216	1.9%
Two or more races	992	8.8%
Hispanic or Latino (of any race)	784	7.0%

== See also ==
- Beverley Mill
