= List of geographical bottoms =

Bottom is used in the name of several geographical features:

- Bottom, North Carolina, small unincorporated community in the Stewarts Creek Township of northern Surry County, North Carolina
- Bottom Bay, on the southeast coast of Barbados, between Cave Bay and Palmetto Bay
- Bottom Creek, West Virginia, unincorporated community in McDowell County, West Virginia, USA
- Bottom Points railway station, railway station on the Zig Zag Railway in the Blue Mountains area of New South Wales
- Bottom Wood, 14.5-hectare (36-acre) woodland in the English county of Buckinghamshire, near the hamlet of Studley Green
- The Bottom (formerly Botte), the capital and largest town of the island of Saba, the Caribbean Netherlands

A number of valleys or low-lying areas are described as bottoms, as are their associated settlements:

- American Bottom, the flood plain of the Mississippi River in the Metro-East region of Southern Illinois
- Aunt Mary's Bottom, an 8.62-hectare (21.3-acre) biological Site of Special Scientific Interest in Dorset, England
- Ballingdon Bottom, a hamlet in Hertfordshire, England
- Beacon's Bottom, also known as Bacon's Bottom, is a hamlet between Piddington and Stokenchurch in England
- Beck Bottom, village in Cumbria, England
- Beech Bottom, Tennessee, unincorporated community in Macon County, Tennessee, in the United States
- Beech Bottom, West Virginia, village in Brooke County, West Virginia, along the Ohio River
- Big Bottom, South Dakota, ghost town in Meade County, South Dakota, United States of America (1878–1887)
- Big Creek Bottom, medium-sized creek located in Union Parish, Louisiana, United States
- Black Bottom, Alabama, unincorporated community in Cullman County, Alabama, United States
- Black Bottom, Detroit, predominantly black neighborhood in Detroit, Michigan
- Black Bottom, Kentucky, unincorporated community in Harlan County, Kentucky, United States
- Black Bottom, Philadelphia, predominantly African American and poor neighborhood in West Philadelphia, Pennsylvania
- Black Bottom Crater, volcanic crater located in Arizona, east-northeast of Sunset Crater, and west-southwest of Roden Crater
- Brazeau Bottom, alluvial floodplain extending along the Mississippi River in Perry County, Missouri
- Chickengrove Bottom, biological Site of Special Scientific Interest southeast of the village of Bowerchalke in Wiltshire, UK
- Clabber Bottom, Kentucky, unincorporated community located in Scott County, Kentucky, United States
- Clover Bottom, Missouri, unincorporated community in Franklin County, in the U.S. state of Missouri
- Combe Bottom, Site of Special Scientific Interest in Surrey, England
- Crumps Bottom, West Virginia, unincorporated community in Summers County, West Virginia, United States
- Davis Bottom, Lexington, neighborhood just southwest of downtown Lexington, Kentucky, United States
- Dilles Bottom, Ohio, unincorporated community in Belmont County, in the U.S. state of Ohio
- Emu Bottom, historic homestead near Sunbury, Victoria, Australia
- Esgyrn Bottom, Site of Special Scientific Interest in Pembrokeshire, South Wales
- False Bottom Creek, stream in the U.S. state of South Dakota
- Fawley Bottom, very small village in south Buckinghamshire, England, north of Henley-on-Thames
- Flint Bottom Creek, stream in Ste. Genevieve County in the U.S. state of Missouri
- Foggy Bottom, one of the oldest late 18th and 19th-century neighborhoods in Washington, D.C.
- Foggy Bottom (Washington Metro), Washington Metro station
- Forgotten Bottom, former name of the Gray's Ferry neighborhood of Philadelphia, PA
- Fraziers Bottom, West Virginia, unincorporated community in Putnam County, West Virginia, United States
- George's Bottom, cave in the British Overseas Territory of Gibraltar
- Gillman Bottom, West Virginia, unincorporated community in Logan County, West Virginia, United States
- Gold Bottom, Yukon, near the Blackstone River Mining Concern
- Green Bottom, Cornwall, hamlet in the parish of Kenwyn in Cornwall, England
- Hammer Bottom, hamlet in the Chichester district in the county of West Sussex
- Honey Bottom, hamlet in Berkshire, England, and part of the civil parish of Boxford
- Hop Bottom, Pennsylvania, Borough of Susquehanna County, Pennsylvania, United States
- Icehouse Bottom, prehistoric Native American site in Monroe County, Tennessee, United States
- Indian Bottom, Kentucky, unincorporated community in Letcher County, Kentucky, United States
- Jackson Bottom, 725-acre wetlands area along the Tualatin River in Washington County, Oregon
- Jolly's Bottom, in west Cornwall, England, United Kingdom
- Locks Bottom, area of Greater London, England, part of the London Borough of Bromley
- Locust Bottom, aka Rollingwood Farm, historic home and national historic district located near Haymarket, Prince William County, Virginia
- Long Bottom, Ohio, unincorporated community in southern Olive Township, Meigs County, Ohio, United States
- Lulsgate Bottom, location of Bristol Airport, England
- Marlow Bottom, large linear village occupying a valley to the north of Marlow, Buckinghamshire
- Meems Bottom, covered bridge in Shenandoah County, Virginia, United States
- Melton Bottom, East Riding of Yorkshire, England
- Mercers Bottom, West Virginia, unincorporated community in Mason County, West Virginia, USA
- Mossy Bottom, Kentucky, unincorporated community and coal town in Pike County, Kentucky, United States
- Mound Bottom, prehistoric Native American complex in Cheatham County, Tennessee, located in the Southeastern United States
- Muses Bottom, West Virginia, unincorporated community in Jackson County, West Virginia, United States
- Newham Bottom, in the Forest of Dean, Gloucestershire, England, to the west of Cinderford
- Nohead Bottom, Virginia, unincorporated community in Middlesex County, Virginia, United States
- Owslebury Bottom, small village in the civil parish of Owslebury in the City of Winchester district of Hampshire, England
- Paradise Bottom, on the south-west side the Avon Gorge, close to the Clifton Suspension Bridge, within North Somerset
- Park Bottom, hamlet north of Pool and near Illogan in west Cornwall, England
- Peach Bottom, Pennsylvania, unincorporated village in Fulton Township, Lancaster County, Pennsylvania, United States
- Peach Bottom Township, York County, Pennsylvania, township in York County, Pennsylvania, 60 miles (97 km) south of Harrisburg
- Pednor Bottom, hamlet in the parish of Chartridge, in Buckinghamshire, England
- Pett Bottom, small settlement about five miles (8.0 km) south of Canterbury, Kent, England
- Pettry Bottom, West Virginia, unincorporated community in Raleigh County, West Virginia
- Plum Bottom Creek, stream located entirely within Geauga County, Ohio
- Pratt's Bottom, village now in the London Borough of Bromley, but historically part of Kent
- Red Vein Bottom, semi-open area of relict wood pasture in Savernake Forest, Wiltshire UK.
- Ridley Bottom, Tidenham, 1.1-hectare (2.7-acre) nature reserve in Gloucestershire
- River Bottom, Oklahoma, census-designated place (CDP) in Muskogee County, Oklahoma, United States
- Rock Bottom Creek, tributary of Roaring Brook in Lackawanna County, Pennsylvania, in the United States
- Rocky Bottom, South Carolina, located in northern Pickens County, South Carolina
- Round Bottom, West Virginia, unincorporated community in Wetzel County, West Virginia
- Rucker's Bottom, archaeological site on the Upper Savannah River in Elbert County, Georgia
- Sarratt Bottom, biological Site of Special Scientific Interest in Sarratt, Hertfordshire, UK
- Scott's Bottom, park in southwestern Wyoming and is maintained by the city of Green River, Wyoming
- Scratchy Bottom (or Scratchy's Bottom), clifftop valley between Durdle Door and Swyre Head in Dorset, England
- Sheffield Bottom, a lock on the Kennet and Avon Canal, in the civil parish of Burghfield in the English county of Berkshire
- Ship Bottom, New Jersey, borough in Ocean County, New Jersey, United States
- Shockoe Bottom, area in Richmond, Virginia, just east of downtown, along the James River
- Six Mile Bottom, hamlet within the parish of Little Wilbraham, near Cambridge in England
- Skinner's Bottom, hamlet near Porthtowan in west Cornwall, England, United Kingdom
- Stony Bottom, West Virginia, unincorporated community located in Pocahontas County, West Virginia, USA
- Superior Bottom, West Virginia, unincorporated community in Logan County, West Virginia, United States
- Tanyard Bottom, also known as Tech Flats, was a shantytown just south of Georgia Tech along Techwood Drive
- Thompson's Bottom, hamlet in the North Kesteven district of Lincolnshire, England
- Walnut Bottom, Pennsylvania, unincorporated community in Cumberland County, Pennsylvania, United States
- Walnut Bottom, West Virginia, unincorporated community in Hardy County, West Virginia, USA
- Washington Bottom, 19th-century Greek Revival plantation house and farm north of Romney, West Virginia, USA
- West Bottom, Virginia, unincorporated community in Fluvanna County, in the U.S. state of Virginia
- Youngs Bottom, West Virginia, unincorporated community in Kanawha County, West Virginia

== See also ==
- Bottom (disambiguation)
- Bottom (surname)
