= Bottom (surname) =

Bottom is a surname. Notable people with the surname include:

- Anthony Bottom (born 1951), former member of both the Black Panther Party (BPP) and the Black Liberation Army (BLA)
- Arthur Bottom (1930–2012), English footballer
- Bob Bottom, OAM, retired investigative journalist and author
- Daniel Bottom (1864–1937), English cricketer
- Dorothy Rouse Bottom (1896–1990), America newspaperwoman
- River Jude Phoenix (né Bottom, 1970–1993), American actor, musician, and activist
- Joaquin Rafael Phoenix (né Bottom, born 1974), American actor, producer, and activist
- Joe Bottom (born 1955), American former competition swimmer, Olympic silver medalist, and former world record-holder
- Mike Bottom (born 1956), head coach of the Michigan Wolverines swimming and diving program at the University of Michigan
- Virgil E. Bottom (1911–2003), American born experimental physicist, contributed to the developing quartz crystal production in the US

== See also ==
- Bottom (disambiguation)
- List of geographical bottoms
- Bottome
- Bottoms (surname)
- Bottomley
- Higginbottom
- Hickinbottom
- Longbottom (disambiguation)
- Ramsbottom (surname)
- Rowbottom (disambiguation)
- Sidebottom
- Winterbottom

Media related to Bottom (surname) at Wikimedia Commons
