= Sanskrit compound =

Aspect of Sanskrit grammar

Sanskrit inherits from its parent, the Proto-Indo-European language, the capability of forming compound nouns, also widely seen in kindred languages, especially German, Greek, and English.

However, Sanskrit, especially in the later stages of the language, significantly expands on this both in terms of the number of elements making up a single compound and the volume of compound usage in the literature, a development which is unique within Indo-European to Sanskrit and closely related languages.

Further, this development in the later language (Note: "In Vedic, noun compounds are hardly more frequent than in Homeric Greek, but their frequency increases throughout the history of the language.. in the later language the occurrence in a single short sentence of several compounds of four or five members is perfectly normal, and in certain styles compounds of twenty or more members are not thought excessive" - Coulson) is an entirely artificial, literary construct and does not reflect the spoken language.

== Background ==
In Sanskrit, as in Proto-Indo-European, a compound is formed by taking the stem-form of the first element (i.e. removing its inflexion) (Note: This process suggests the possibility of an early stage of Proto-Indo-European where words could appear in a sentence without case terminations.) and combining the two elements with a single accented syllable.

In the later language, this process can be repeated recursively—in theory, ad infinitum, with the freshly made compound becoming the first element of a new one.

The process of 'resolving' the compound, i.e., expounding the meaning using the component words declined as in sentence form is termed vigraha·vākya.

Broadly, compounds can be divided into two classes: endocentric and exocentric.

=== Endocentric compounds ===
An endocentric compound, usually called determinative, is where the compound is essentially the sum of its parts, the meaning being an extension of one of the parts:

- blackbird → a type of black bird (Note: a particular species, not just any bird that is black)
- White House → the official residence of the US president (Note: the specific presidential residence, not just any house that is white)
- siṃha·purás → lion-city (Singapore)

=== Exocentric compounds ===
An exocentric compound refers to something outside the components:

- redhead → someone with red hair (Note: that is, not a head)
- pickpocket → someone who picks someone else's pockets (Note: that is, not a pocket)
- 'bahu·vrīhi' → lit. 'much-rice', i.e., possessing much rice: an indication of wealth

Indeed, this term 'bahuvrihi' is used both in Sanskrit and standard Indo-European linguistics to denote this type of compound.

Sanskrit expands on these to provide several further distinctions as below:

== Classification ==
In traditional Sanskrit grammar, compounds (Note: samāsa·vṛtti) are divided into the following main classes:

- Tatpuruṣa
  - Tatpuruṣa proper
  - Karmadhāraya
    - Dvigu
  - Nañ-tatpuruṣa
  - Prādi and gati
  - Upapada
- Bahuvrīhi
  - Dvigu
- Dvandva
- Avyayībhāva

The first two of these, tatpuruṣa and bahuvrīhi, are Indo-European inheritances, the latter two are Indic innovations. Alongside the term bahuvrīhi, tatpuruṣa has also been adopted in mainstream Indo-European linguistics as the technical term denoting this type of compounding.

The following sections give an outline of the main types of compounds with examples. The examples demonstrate the composition of the compound's elements, and the meanings in English generally correspond to them, in most cases being a similar compound as well. Where this is not the case or the meaning is not clear, a further resolution is provided.

=== Tatpuruṣa (determinative) ===
A tatpuruṣa is an endocentric compound composed of two elements, wherein the first one, named the attributive, determines the second one.

Based on the grammatical nature of the attributive member, six varieties of tatpuruṣa compounds are identified as seen in the classification above. A further distinction is also made based on whether the attributive is in the nominative or an oblique (Note: accusative, instrumental, dative, ablative, genitive, or locative) case. (Note: The word tatpuruṣa (a 'that-man', in the sense of 'that person's man', i.e., 'someone's agent') is itself a tatpuruṣa compound.)

==== Tatpuruṣa proper ====
The first member here is an attributive in an oblique relationship with the second, and are therefore termed dependent determinatives.

Word	Meaning, resolution	Relationship
jaya·prepsu	victory-seeking	Accusative
deva·dattá-	god-given: given by the gods	Instrumental
viṣṇu·bali	Viṣṇu-offering: offering to Viṣṇu	Dative
svarga·patitá-	heaven-fallen: fallen from heaven	Ablative
vyāghra·buddhi	tiger-thought: the thought of it being a tiger	Genitive
yajur·veda-	sacrifice-knowledge: the knowledge of sacrifice	Genitive
gṛha·jāta-	house-born: born in the house	Locative

==== Karmadhāraya-tatpuruṣa (descriptive) ====
In a karmadhāraya-tatpuruṣa compound, the first element qualifies the second one adjectively when the latter is a noun. When the second member is an adjective, the qualification is adverbial. Other parts of speech besides adjectives and adverbs may be used to obtain the adjective or adverbial qualification.

Word	Meaning, resolution
nīlôtpala	blue lotus
sarva·guṇa	all good quality
priya·sakha	dear friend
maha·rṣí	great-sage
rajata·pātrá	silver cup

===== Dvigu-tatpuruṣa (numerative) =====
In essence dvigu can refer to several compound types where the first element is a numeral. (Note: The word dvi·gu itself is an example of dvigu: lit. 'two-cow', used in the sense of 'worth two cows'.) Dvigu-tatpuruṣa compounds are a special subcategory of karmadhārayas.

Word	Meaning, resolution
dvi·rājá-	(the battle of) two kings
tri·bhuvana-	three-world: the universe
tri·yugá-	three ages
tri·divá	the triple heaven
daśâṅgulá-	ten fingers' breadth
ṣaḍ·ahá-	six day's time
sahasrâhṇyá-	thousand days' journey

dvigu compounds of bahuvrīhi type are noted below.

==== Nañ-tatpuruṣa (negative) ====
In a nañ-tatpuruṣa compound, the first element is a privative, a negator: a- (before consonant), an- (before vowel) or na-, just like the English un-, Latin-derived in-, non- or Greek-derived a- (before consonant), an- (before vowel) .

Word	Meaning, resolution
á·brāhmaṇa	non-Brahmin
án·aśva	non-horse: not a horse
á·pati	non-master: not a master
á·vidyā	non-knowledge: ignorance
á·kumāra	unyoung: old
á·śraddhā	unbelief, non-creed

==== Upapada-tatpuruṣa ====
These are composed of a second member that occurs only in a compound and cannot stand on its own. (Note: called a bound form) These are either roots or verbal derivatives from them.

Word	Meaning, resolution
sa·yúj	joining together
su·kṛ́t	well-doing, a good deed
kumbha·kāra-	pot-maker
sva·rā́j	self-ruling: sovereign
manu·já	Manu-born, born of Manu, man
svayam·bhū́	self-existent
eka·já	only-born
jala·dá	water-giving: a cloud
sarva·jñá	all-knowing: an omniscient person

==== Aluk-tatpuruṣa ====
In an aluk-tatpuruṣa compound, in contrast to the standard pattern of being in stem form, the first element takes a case form as if in a sentence:

First Element → Word	Meaning, resolution	Case
ojas → ojasā·kṛtá-	done with might	Instrumental
ātman → ātmane·pada-	'word for self': the reflexive voice	Dative
dyaus → divas·pati	'lord of the sky': a name of Indra	Genitive
yudh → yudhi·ṣṭhira-	'firm in battle': a name	Locative

=== Dvandva (co-ordinative) ===
These consist of two or more noun stems connected with "and" (copulative or co-ordinative). There are mainly three kinds of dvandva pair constructions in Sanskrit:

==== Itaretara-dvandva ====
The result of itaretara-dvandva (Note: enumerative dvandva) is an enumerative word, the meaning of which refers to all its constituent members. The resultant compound word is in the dual or plural number and takes the gender of the final member in the compound construction. Examples:

Word	Meaning, resolution
mitrā́·váruṇau	Mitra and Varuṇa
dyāvā·pṛthivī	heaven and earth
vrīhi·yavaú	rice and barley
candrādityau	moon and sun
devāsurā́s	the gods and the demons
hasty·aśvās	elephants and horses
roga·śoka·parītāpa·bandhana·vyasanāni	disease, pain, grief, bondage and adversity

==== Samāhāra-dvandva ====
Words may be organised in a compound to form a metonym, and sometimes the words may comprise all the constituent parts of the whole. The resultant bears a collective sense and is always singular and neutral.

Word	Literal ⇒ Meaning
pāṇi·pādam	'hands and feet' ⇒ limbs, appendages
āhāra·nidrā·bhayam	'food, sleep and fear' ⇒ vicissitudes, features of life

==== Ekaśeṣa-dvandva ====
Some Sanskrit grammarians identify a third kind of dvandva which they call ekaśeṣa-dvandva, (Note: one-(stem)-remains) where only one stem remains in what is viewed as the compound of multiple words.

Compound	Resolution	Meaning
pitarau	mātā + pitā	'mother and father' ⇒ parents (Note: compare Spanish padres ⇒ 'parents')
mṛgāḥ	mṛgaḥ + mṛgā	'does and bucks' ⇒ deer
putrāḥ	putrāḥ + duhitaraḥ	'sons and daughters' ⇒ children

==== Āmreḍita (iterative) ====
While not strictly copulative, this is a compound consisting of the same word repeated with the first occurrence accented.

Āmreḍita compounds are used to express repetitiveness; for example, from dív- (day) we obtain divé-dive ('day after day', daily) and from devá- (god) we obtain deváṃ-devam or devó-devas ('deity after deity').

=== Bahuvrīhi (possessive) ===
Bahuvrīhi (Note: 'much-riced', i.e., a rich person) is an exocentric compound consisting of a noun preceded by a grammatical modifier which, taken together, functions as a single nominalised adjective.

A bahuvrīhi compound can often be translated by "possessing..." or "-ed"; for example, "possessing much rice" or "much-riced". In English, examples of bahuvrīhi would be "lowlife" and "blockhead" (they respectively denote 'one whose life is low' and 'one whose head resembles a block'), or the English surname Longbottom ('one who lives in a long "botham" [valley]').

The second element could essentially have been a noun, which within such a compound, can take on adjective declensions with the compound used adjectivally. Endocentric compounds can thus be transformed into possessives, normally accompanied, and explicitly recognized in the older language, by a change in accentuation:

- indra·śatrú-, 'Indra's killer' ⇒ índra·śatru-, 'having Indra as killer' (Note: To illustrate the importance of correct accentuation, the grammarian Patañjali (living around 150 BCE) is said to have cited the story of Vṛtra, who on account of the wrong accent used on this compound ends up instead of being Indra's killer, himself killed by Indra!)
- bṛhad·ratha-, 'a great chariot' ⇒ bṛhád·ratha-, 'having great chariots'
- sūrya·tejás-, 'sun's brightness' ⇒ sū́rya·tejas-, 'possessing the brightness of the sun'

A few typical examples of such compounds:

Word	Meaning, resolution
mayū́ra·roman-	peacock-plumed
ugrá·bāhu-	strong-shouldered
jīvitá·vatsa-	alive-childed: having living children (Note: Indeed in later Sanskrit, the tendency to use compounds instead of verb-based clauses is so strong, in a classical drama, to express gratitude for having children who are alive, one would say the equivalent of 'thank heaven, I'm alive-childed': diṣṭyā, jīvita·vats'âsmi)
mádhu·jihva-	honeytongue, honey-tongued: talking nicely
pátra·hasta-	vessel-handed: holding a vessel in the hand
khara-mukha-	donkey-faced

==== Dvigu-bahuvrīhi ====
When the first element of a bahuvrīhi is a numeral, the compound is called dvigu. (Note: An example will be the word dvigu itself, which as a bahuvrīhi means '[a] two-cow [person]'; i.e., one who has two cows (dvau gāvau).) An English example would be a halfwit ('one who has half of their mind').

A few typical examples of such compounds:

Word	Meaning, resolution
éka·cakra-	one-wheeled
éka·pad	one-footed
cátur·aṅga-	four-limbed
saptá·jihva-	seven-tongued
aṣṭá·putra-	eight-sonned: having eight sons
náva·dvāra-	nine-doored
śatá·dant	hundred-toothed
sahásra·nāman	thousandname: having a thousand names

=== Avyayībhāva (adverbial) ===
Avyayībhāvas ('indeclinable') are adverbial compounds composed of an indeclinable element (an adverb, etc.) and a noun, together expressing an adverb or another indeclinable (avyaya) element.

Word	Meaning, resolution
adhy·ātmam	concerning the self
anu·ratham	behind the chariots
upa·rājam	near the king; kingside
praty·agni	towards the fire
prati·niśam	every night
yathā·śakti	per-strength: according to one's ability
sa·cakram	simultaneously with the wheel
antar·jalam	inter-water: within the water

== See also ==
- Sanskrit nominals
- Sanskrit verbs
- Sanskrit grammar
- Vedic Sanskrit grammar
- Proto-Indo-European verbs
- Proto-Indo-Aryan
- Proto-Indo-Iranian
- Proto-Indo-European
- Kenning

== Bibliography ==
- Coulson, Michael (2003). Sanskrit (Teach yourself) (2003 ed.). Great Britain: Oxford. ISBN 0-340-32389-2.
- Fortson, Benjamin W (2010). Indo-European Language and Culture (2010 ed.). Wiley-Blackwell. ISBN 978-1-4051-8895-1.
- Burrow, T (2001). The Sanskrit Language (2001 ed.). Motilal Banarsidass. ISBN 81-208-1767-2.
- Whitney, William Dwight (January 2008). Sanskrit Grammar (2000 ed.). Motilal Banarsidass. ISBN 978-81-208-0620-7.
- Macdonnel, Arthur Anthony (1997). A Sanskrit Grammar for Students. Motilal Banarsidass. ISBN 81-246-0094-5.
- Macdonnel, Arthur Anthony (1993). A Vedic Sanskrit Grammar for Students (2000 ed.). Motilal Banarsidass. ISBN 81-208-1053-8.
- Goldman, Robert P (2019). Deva·vāṇī́·praveśikā. Center for South Asia Studies, University of California. ISBN 978-0-944613-40-5.
- Kale, M R (1969). A Higher Sanskrit Grammar (2002 ed.). Motilal Banarsidass. ISBN 81-208-0177-6.
- Adams, Valerie (1987). An Introduction to Modern English Word-Formation. Longman Group. ISBN 0-582-55042-4.
- Meyer, Charles (2009). Introducing English Linguistics (1st ed.). Cambridge University Press. ISBN 978-0-521-83350-9.
- Carstairs-McCarthy, Andrew (2002). An Introduction to English Morphology. Edinburgh University Press. ISBN 0-7486-1326-9.
- Tubb, Gary; Boose, Emery (2007). Scholastic Sanskrit. NY: American Inst of Buddhist Studies. ISBN 978-0-9753734-7-7.
- Deshpande, Madhav M (1993). Sanskrit and Prakrit (1993 ed.). Motilal Banarsidass. ISBN 81-208-1136-4.
