= The Bottoms =

The Bottoms may refer to:

- The Bottoms (novel), a 2000 novel by Joe R. Lansdale
- The Bottoms (SSSI), a protected area in England
- The Bottoms (TV series), US television series
- The Bottoms, an area in Franklinton (Columbus, Ohio), United States
- "The Bottoms", an episode of American TV series Hap and Leonard

== See also ==
- Bottom (disambiguation)
