= Round Bottom =

Round Bottom may refer to:

- Round-bottom flask, a type of flask
- Round Bottom, West Virginia, an unincorporated community in Wetzel County
