= Bottoming =

Bottoming may refer to:

- Bottoming, a bending process for sheet metal and other thin materials
- Bottoming cycle, the low-temperature power-generation cycle of a combined-cycle power plant
- Top, bottom, and versatile, as sexual roles in penetrative sex

== See also ==
- Bottom (disambiguation)
