= Mt. Atlas (Haymarket, Virginia) =

Historic house in Virginia, United States

- U.S. National Register of Historic Places
- U.S. Historic district
- Virginia Landmarks Register
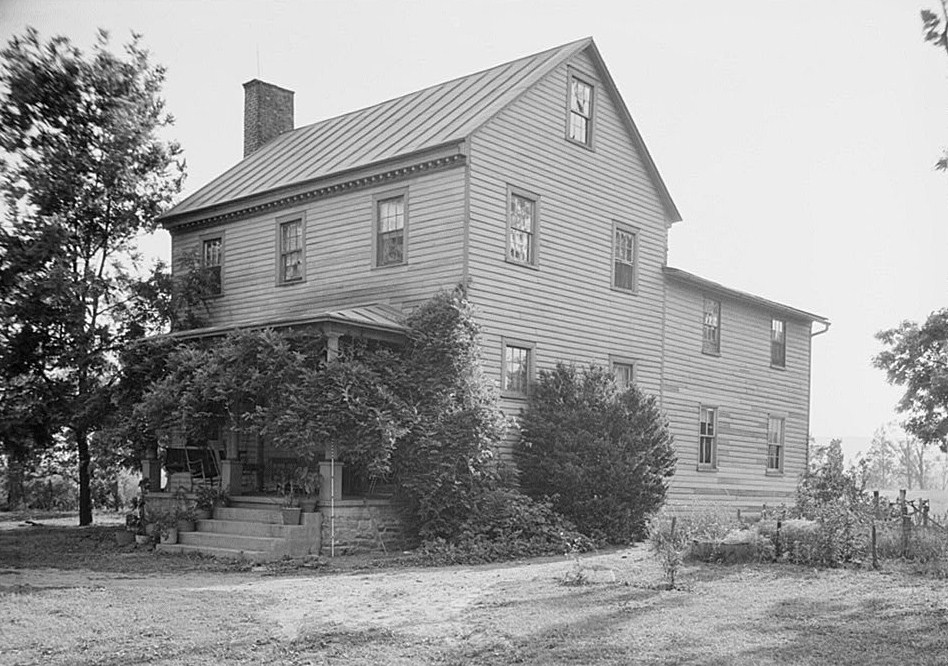
- Mount Atlas, HABS Photo

- Location within Northern Virginia Location within Virginia Location within the United States
- Location: 4105 Mt. Atlas Ln., near Haymarket, Virginia
- Coordinates: 38°52′6″N 77°39′47″W
- Area: 8.2 acres (3.3 ha)
- Built: c. 1795
- Architectural style: Classical Revival, Late Victorian, Georgian
- NRHP reference No.: 89001799
- VLR No.: 076-0015

Significant dates
- Added to NRHP: October 30, 1989
- Designated VLR: December 13, 1988

Mt. Atlas is a historic home and national historic district located near Haymarket, Virginia, United States. It was built about 1795 and is a 2 1/2-story, three-bay, Georgian style, frame dwelling with a single-pile, side hall plan. It has a 1 1/2-story rear ell dated to the late-19th century and a two bay front porch. The house features a single exterior stone chimney, a metal gable roof, and a molded, boxed cornice with modillions. Also included in the district are a smokehouse and the sites of the former kitchen and a carriage house.

It was added to the National Register of Historic Places in 1989.

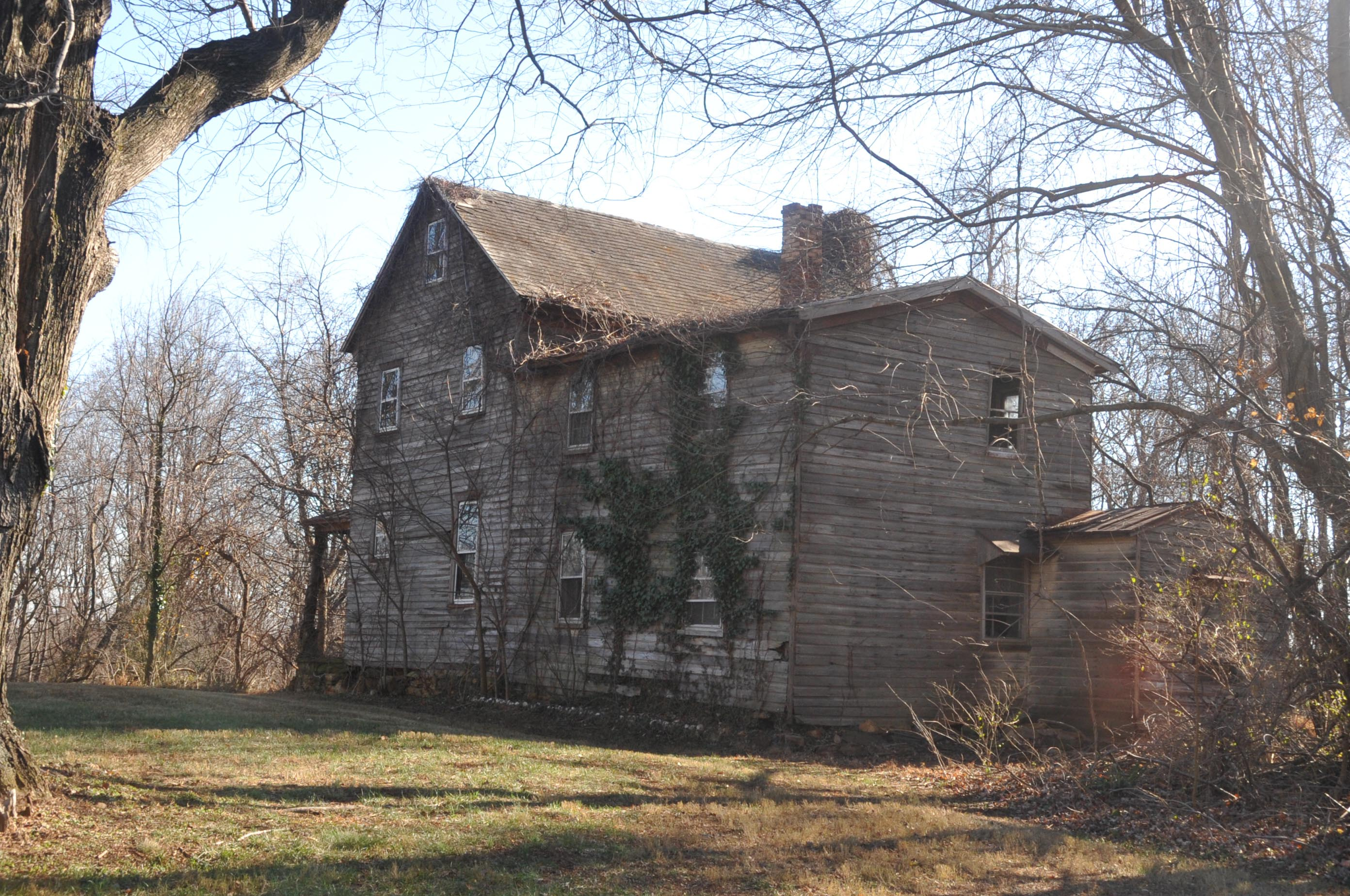
Now abandoned
