= Bottome =

Bottome is a surname. Notable people with the surname include:

- Margaret McDonald Bottome (1827–1906), American reformer, organizational founder, author
- Peter Bottome (1937–2016), Venezuelan businessman
- Phyllis Bottome (1884–1963), British writer

== See also ==
- Bottom (disambiguation)
