= Hickinbottom =

Hickinbottom is a surname. It is a corruption of Oakenbottom, a place in Bolton-le-Moors, probably influenced by the dialect word hickin or higgin, the mountain ash.

Notable people with the surname include:

- David Hickinbottom (fl. 1963–1965), British figure skater
- Ernest Hickinbottom (1865–1939), English footballer
- Gary Hickinbottom (born 1955), British judge
- Geoffrey Hickinbottom (born 1932), English cricketer
- Wilfred Hickinbottom (1896–1979), English chemist

== See also ==
- Higginbottom
