= Old Town Hall and School =

- U.S. National Register of Historic Places
- Virginia Landmarks Register
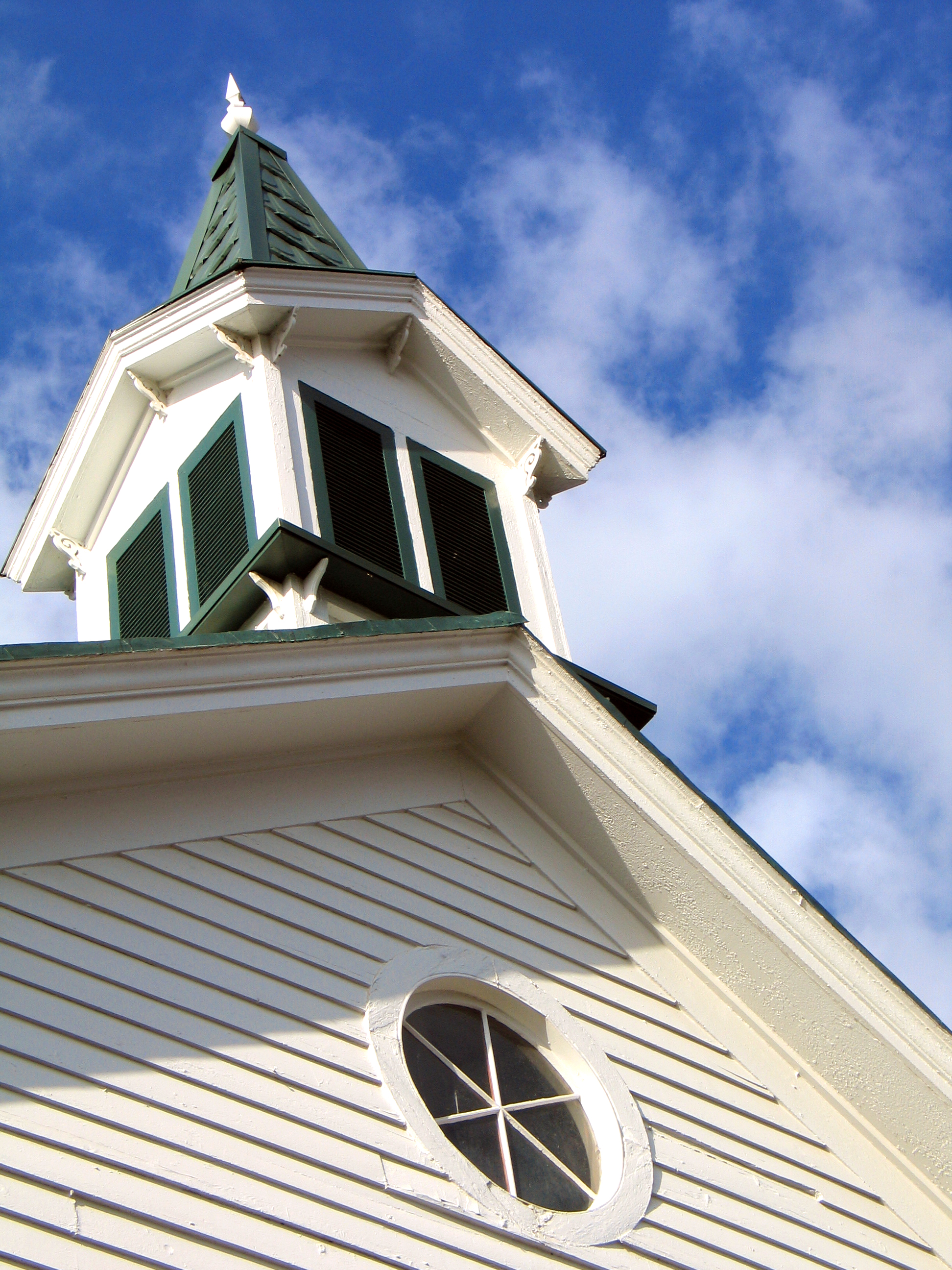
- Haymarket Museum, September 2009

- Location within Northern Virginia Location within Virginia Location within the United States
- Location: 15025 Washington St., Haymarket, Virginia
- Coordinates: 38°48′45″N 77°38′14″W
- Area: .38 acres (0.15 ha)
- Built: c. 1883
- Architectural style: Greek Revival, Victorian
- NRHP reference No.: 11000063
- VLR No.: 233-0006

Significant dates
- Added to NRHP: March 1, 2011
- Designated VLR: December 16, 2010

Old Town Hall and School, also known as the Haymarket Museum, is a historic town hall and school located at Haymarket, Prince William County, Virginia. It was built in 1883, and is a front-gable, two-story, wooden structure clad in weatherboard with Greek Revival and Victorian style decorative elements. It features a square, pyramidal-roofed belfry situated above the front gable that has louvers, sawn brackets, and gables on each face. Its use as a school stopped around 1900. It continued to serve as the Town Hall as well as a community meeting place until 2001. The building currently houses the Haymarket Museum.

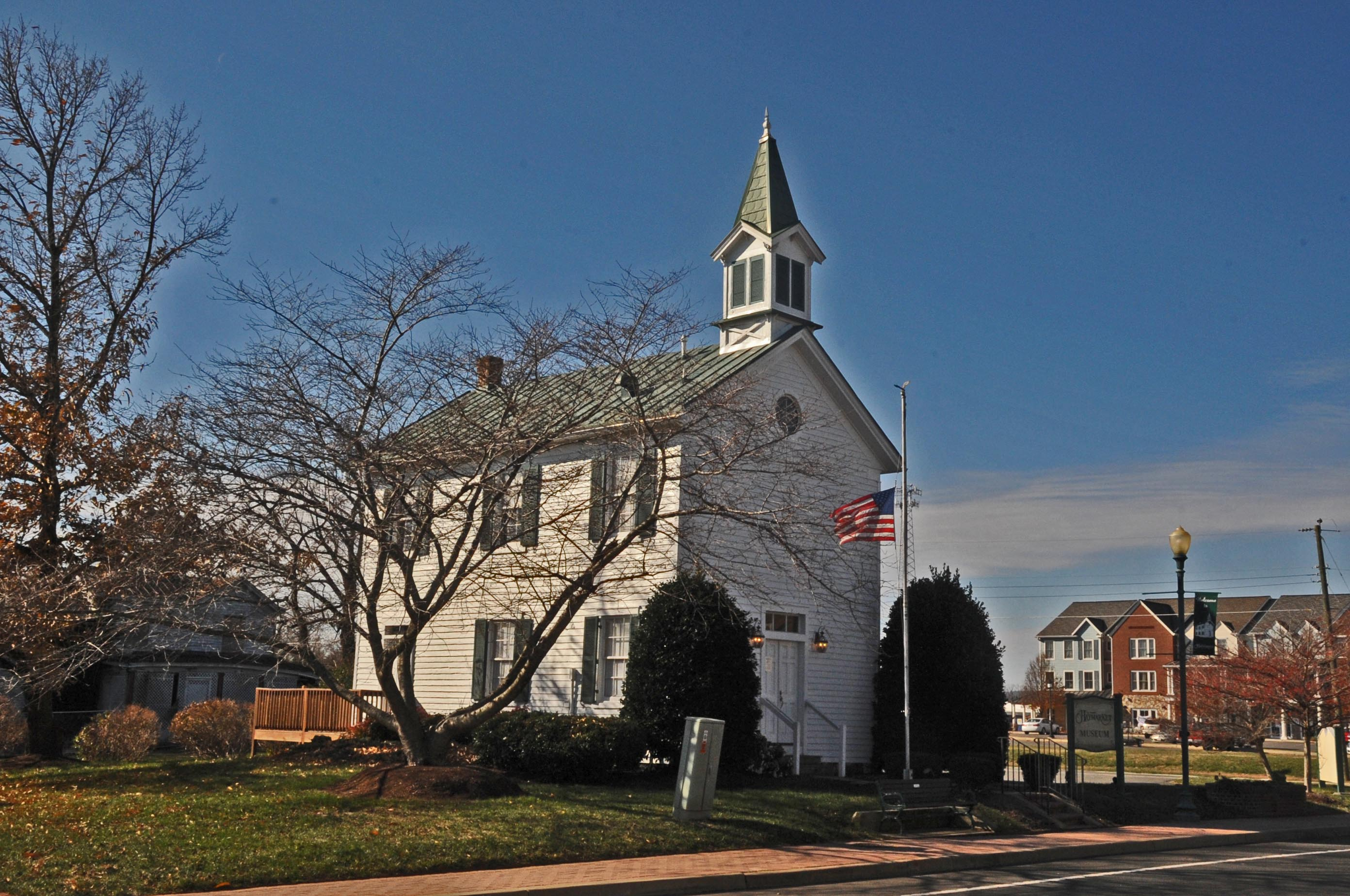
Old Town Hall and School

It was added to the National Register of Historic Places in 2011.
