= Bottomley =

Bottomley and its homophone Bottomly are English surnames. They come from the placename formed by combining geographic terms "bottom" and "ley", and which refers to two small settlements each on opposite sides of a hill near Walsden and Halifax, West Yorkshire. It first appears in written records from 1277. Notable people with these surnames include:

- Arthur Bottomley (1907–1995), British Labour politician
- Christine Bottomley (born 1979), English actress
- Gordon Bottomley (1874–1948), English poet
- Horatio Bottomley (1860–1933), British journalist, newspaper proprietor and fraudster, MP for Hackney South
- James Bottomley (diplomat) (1920–2013), British diplomat
- James Thomson Bottomley (1845–1926), British physicist
- Jim Bottomley (1900–1959), baseball player
- John Bottomley, Canadian singer-songwriter
- John Bottomly, claimant in Bottomly v. Passamaquoddy Tribe
- John Wallace Bottomley (1934–2017), English television presenter, better known as John Noakes
- Laura Bottomley, American electrical engineer
- Norman Bottomley, senior Royal Air Force commander
- Peter Bottomley (born 1944), British Conservative politician
- R. V. Bottomly (1885–1961), American politician and judge
- Samuel Bottomley (born 2001), English actor
- Susan Bottomly (born 1950), aka International Velvet, American model and actress
- Virginia Bottomley (born 1948), British politician
- William Bottomley (1882–1966), Unitarian minister in Melbourne, Australia
- William Lawrence Bottomley (1883–1951), American architect

== Fictional ==
- Bottomly, disruptive student in Australian radio comedy Yes, What?

== See also ==
- Bottomley projection
- Bothamley
