= Haymarket, Virginia =

Town in Virginia, United States

- Town
- Town of Haymarket
- Seal
- Nickname: "The Crossroads"
- Location in Prince William County and the state of Virginia

- Location within Prince William area Location within Northern Virginia Location within Virginia Location within the United States
- Coordinates: 38°48′46″N 77°38′6″W
- Country: United States
- State: Virginia
- County: Prince William

Government
  - Type: Mayor-council
  - Mayor: TracyLynn Pater
  - Vice Mayor: Matthew Gallagher

Area
  - Total: 0.58 sq mi (1.49 km^{2})
  - Land: 0.58 sq mi (1.49 km^{2})
  - Water: 0 sq mi (0.00 km^{2})
- Elevation: 367 ft (112 m)

Population (2020)
  - Total: 1,545
  - Density: 2,692/sq mi (1,039.2/km^{2})
- Time zone: UTC−5 (Eastern (EST))
  - Summer (DST): UTC−4 (EDT)
- ZIP codes: 20168-20169
- Area codes: 571, 703
- FIPS code: 51-35976
- GNIS feature ID: 1499541
- Website: townofhaymarket.org

Haymarket is a town in Prince William County, Virginia, United States. The population was 1,545 as of the 2020 census.

== History ==
=== 18th century ===
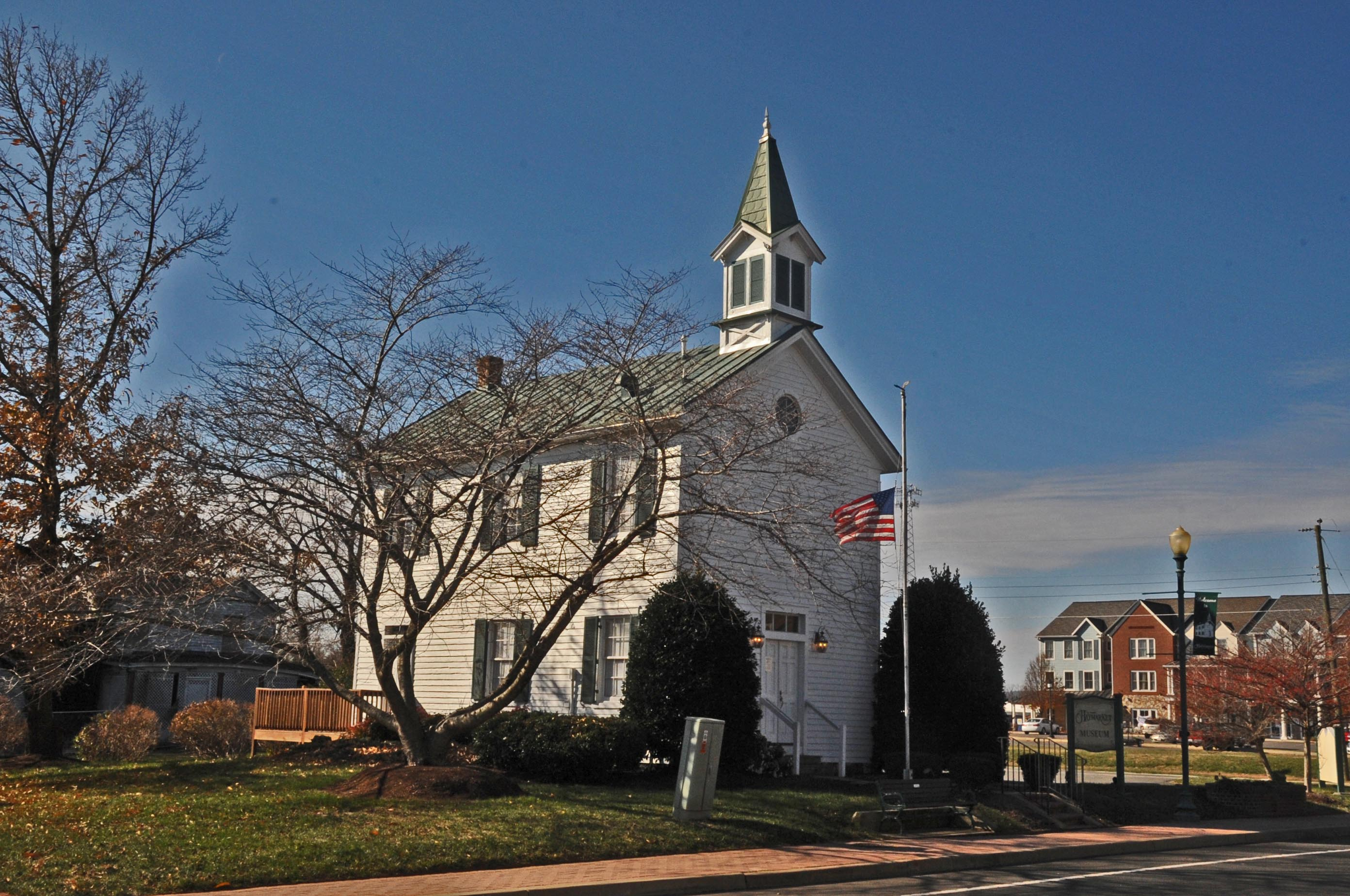
Built in 1883 in Greek Revival and Victorian style to serve as both a schoolhouse and town hall, in 2001 it was adapted as the Haymarket Museum.

Haymarket is built on land that used to be hunting grounds of the western Iroquois nations, who came from the New York and Pennsylvania area around the Great Lakes. They used hunting paths through the land until 1722, when they made a treaty with the colonies of Virginia and New York to move into the Blue Ridge Mountain region.

Due to the hunting paths, this location, and later the town, were given the nickname The Crossroads. The town of Haymarket began to be developed and built after the American Revolutionary War, formally founded in 1799 on the land of William Skinker. The Virginia General Assembly gave Skinker the rights to lay out the town, which he drew to consist of 13 streets and 140 lots. Shortly after, a clerk's office and jail were constructed in 1801, as the town had been selected as the site of what is now a district court. The town owed its early development to business and trade associated with the regular court sessions.

=== 19th century ===
In 1807, the Virginia General Assembly abolished the district court in favor of the circuit court system, which established a court at each county seat. Until 1830 the court house remained the focal point of the town, while serving multiple purposes. In 1830, the court house was converted into and deeded as an Episcopal church; in 1833 it was consecrated as St Paul's.

During the American Civil War, on November 4, 1862, Union army troops invaded Haymarket and set the entire town on fire. Only four buildings survived: three small houses and St. Paul's Church. For the remainder of the war, Haymarket remained mostly uninhabited. A skirmish took place on October 19, 1863, involving the Second Brigade, Second Division, and Fifth Army Corps. Another skirmish took place in June 1863. They both involved Union encounters with the Confederate cavalry. Following General Robert E. Lee's surrender, Haymarket began to recover. Slowly it regained its former prosperity and size.

Haymarket was incorporated in 1882, the second town in Prince William County to do so. The first mayor elected was Garrett Hulfish and the first councilmen elected were T.A. Smith, Charles Jordan, and William W. Meade. In May 1882 during the council's second meeting, the rudimentary ordinances were drafted and adopted.

On March 19, 1892, Lee Heflin and Joseph Dye were lynched in Haymarket. They had been convicted of the murder of a girl and sentenced to death, but the mob thought the legal system moved too slowly. The men were hanged from trees at the edge of woods; then the mob shot into their bodies. The Washington Post said, "mob law...is a dangerous thing to encourage. There is too much of it already throughout the country, and it spreads like a contagion so long as public sentiment tacitly approves it." It was unusual that white men were lynched; in Virginia and the rest of the South, usually black men were victims of lynching.

From 1882 to the present day, most of the buildings in central Haymarket have remained unchanged. The town borders U.S Route 15. Growth has occurred outside the town. While no schools are located within the town, the larger area has five schools, and each are part of Prince William County Public Schools.

=== 20th century ===
In the 1970s, during the construction of the Interstate System, Haymarket was served by Exit 40 of Interstate 66. Being connected to the interstate, during a period of growth in the Northern Virginia region, has produced a population boom in the area of suburban development.

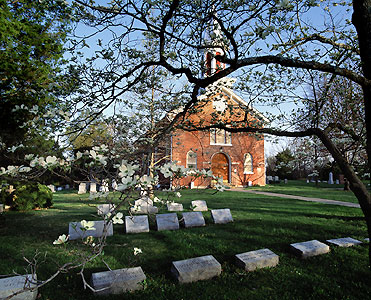
St. Paul's Church in Haymarket

In 1994, The Walt Disney Company bought extensive amounts of land in Haymarket for a proposed Disney's America theme park. Local resistance to the resort, because of perceived adverse effects on the Manassas Battlefield, resulted in the defeat of the park.

=== 21st century ===
William B. Snyder, a local businessman, convinced Disney to sell the property to him. Snyder, in turn, sold off most of the land to developers, except for the 405 acres (1.64 km^{2}) donated to the National Capital Area Council of the Boy Scouts of America. It used this land to develop Camp Snyder.

In addition to St. Paul's Church, Evergreen, Locust Bottom, Mt. Atlas, and Old Town Hall and School are listed on the National Register of Historic Places.

== Geography ==
Haymarket is located at 38°48′46″N 77°38′6″W (38.812670, −77.635084). Haymarket is located in the Piedmont region of Virginia, sitting at the base of Bull Run Mountains. Haymarket is located just outside of the region considered "NOVA". Geographically, Haymarket serves as a marker to show the start of Virginia outside of the "NOVA" region.

According to the United States Census Bureau, the town has a total area of 0.6 square mile (1.5 km^{2}), all land.

The greater town of Haymarket (ZIP code 20169) has a total area of 32.2 square miles (83.4 km^{2}), with 0.2 square mile (0.5 km^{2}) of water.

== Demographics ==
Historical population
Census	Pop.	Note	%±
1880	107		—
1910	162		—
1920	133		−17.9%
1930	167		25.6%
1940	156		−6.6%
1950	213		36.5%
1960	257		20.7%
1970	288		12.1%
1980	230		−20.1%
1990	483		110.0%
2000	879		82.0%
2010	1,782		102.7%
2020	1,545		−13.3%
U.S. Decennial Census

=== 2020 census ===
As of the 2020 census, there were 1,545 people living in Haymarket. The median age was 35.1 years. 29.2% of residents were under the age of 18 and 6.9% were 65 years of age or older. For every 100 females, there were 98.1 males, and for every 100 females age 18 and over, there were 97.8 males age 18 and over.

100.0% of residents lived in urban areas, while 0.0% lived in rural areas.

There were 477 households in Haymarket, of which 52.8% had children under the age of 18 living in them. Of all households, 62.9% were married-couple households, 14.3% were households with a male householder and no spouse or partner present, and 17.8% were households with a female householder and no spouse or partner present. About 15.1% of all households were made up of individuals, and 3.5% had someone living alone who was 65 years of age or older.

There were 492 housing units, of which 3.0% were vacant. The homeowner vacancy rate was 0.5% and the rental vacancy rate was 3.7%.

Racial composition as of the 2020 census
Race	Number	Percent
White	955	61.8%
Black or African American	115	7.4%
American Indian and Alaska Native	3	0.2%
Asian	215	13.9%
Native Hawaiian and Other Pacific Islander	0	0.0%
Some other race	85	5.5%
Two or more races	172	11.1%
Hispanic or Latino (of any race)	197	12.8%

=== Demographic estimates ===
In 2019, the census reported 377 families residing in the town and an estimated population density of 1,725.2 people per square mile (665.5/km^{2}).

=== Income and poverty ===
The median income for a household in the town was $128,125; the per capita income was $46,943. Haymarket's zip code 20169 is the wealthiest in Prince William County. About 3.7% of the population was below the poverty line.

== Recreation ==
Haymarket is home to several golf courses, with over 38 golf courses located within 20 miles of the town. Notable courses include the Bull Run Golf Club and Raspberry Golf Academy, both situated in the nearby Bull Run Mountain Estates.

Another recreational area, Silver Lake Regional Park, can be found just outside Haymarket. This park spans over 230 acres and features a 23-acre lake, which is fed by the Little Bull Run and is open to fishing and non-motorized boats. The lake is home to various fish species, including trout, bass, and catfish. Additionally, the adjacent James S. Long Regional Park offers 4.6 miles of equestrian trails, which connect to Silver Lake Regional Park via a bridge.

Haymarket is located within the piedmont region of Virginia, an area known for its wineries, such as La Grange. The history of winemaking in Prince William County dates back to the 1800s and early 1900s, when several wineries were in operation.

== Education ==
- Battlefield High School has been ranked by US News as the Number 1 high school in the Prince William County Public Schools for several years. Additionally, the school has been ranked as Number 18 in the state as well as Number 833 nationally in 2021 out of 17,857 high schools nationwide.
- Haymarket Elementary School opened on September 2, 2014, after an August 19, 2014, ribbon-cutting ceremony.
- Mountain View Elementary opened in September 1995.
- Ronald Reagan Middle School opened in 2012.
- Samuel L. Gravely Jr. Elementary School opened in 2008.
- Alvey Elementary School opened in 2003 and enrolled 458 students as of September 2020.

== Public Safety ==
Haymarket, Virginia is considered one of the safest places in America, reporting a crime rate lower than 85% of all towns in America with a population of 1,000 or more residents. The crime rate in Haymarket is 14.7 times lower than the US average. In 2016, only 16 total offences were known to exist to law enforcement.

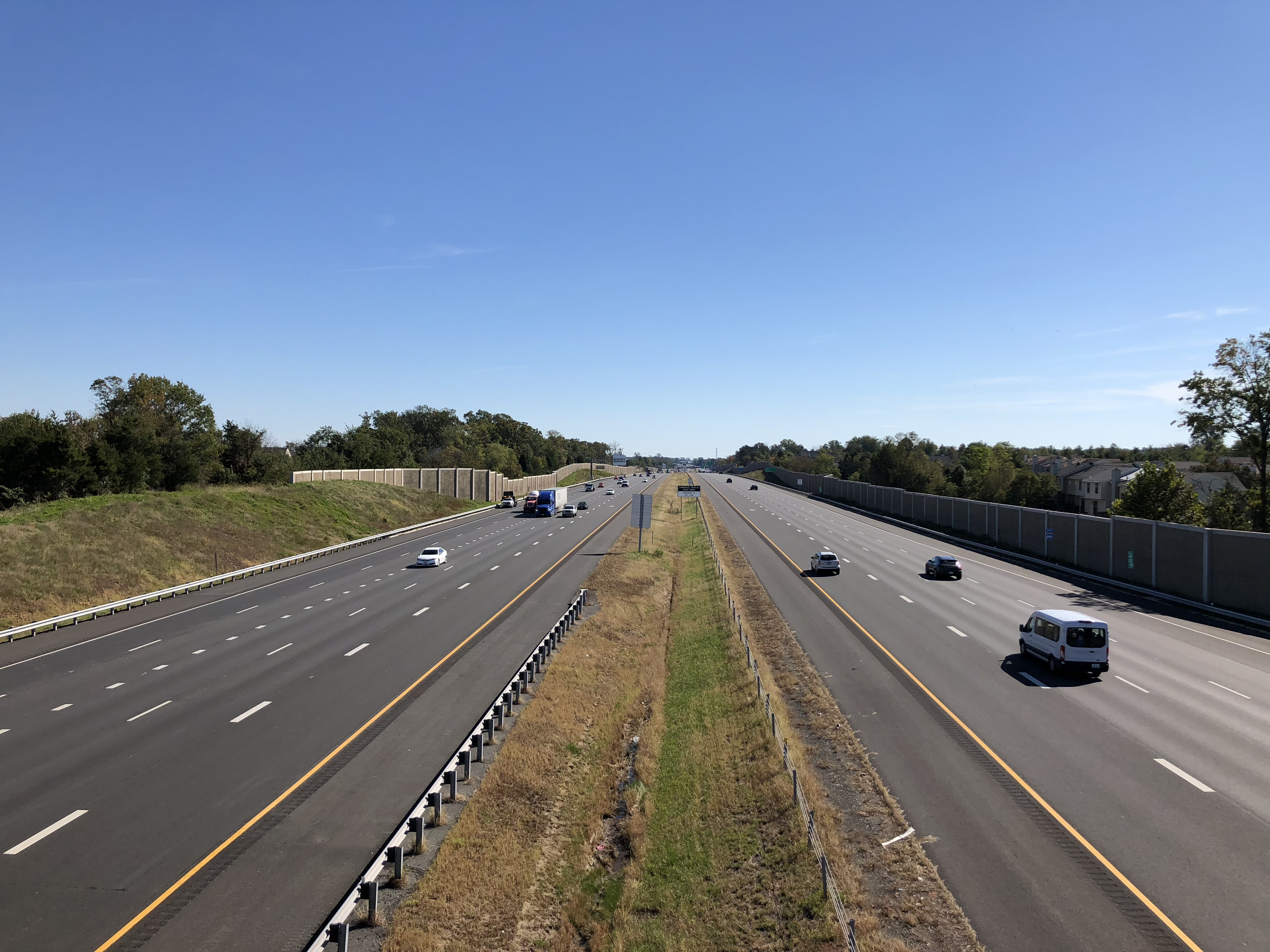
View east along I-66 in Haymarket

== Transportation ==
Interstate 66 is the primary highway serving Haymarket. It extends westward to Interstate 81 near Front Royal, and eastward to Washington, D.C., with connections to Interstate 95 via Interstate 495. North-south travel is provided via U.S. Route 15, which skims the northwest side of town. US 15 connects north to Leesburg and south to Warrenton. Virginia State Route 55 also passes through Haymarket, serving as a local service road for I-66 and acting as Main Street within Haymarket.

== See also ==
- Boy Scouts of America's Camp Snyder
