= Bull Run Mountain Estates, Virginia =

Bull Run Mountain Estates
- CDP
- Location in Prince William County and the state of Virginia.
- Coordinates: 38°54′33″N 77°40′0″W
- Country: United States
- State: Virginia
- County: Prince William
- Time zone: UTC−5 (Eastern (EST))
  - Summer (DST): UTC−4 (EDT)
- ZIP codes: 20169
- FIPS code: 51-11245
- GNIS feature ID: 2629755

Bull Run Mountain Estates is a census-designated place in Prince William County, Virginia, United States. As of the 2020 census, Bull Run Mountain Estates had a population of 1,220. It is located along the eastern slope of the Bull Run Mountains, between Haymarket and Aldie.

== Demographics ==
Historical population
Census	Pop.	Note	%±
2010	1,261		—
2020	1,220		−3.3%
U.S. Decennial Census; 2000 2010

Bull Run Mountain Estates was first listed as a census designated place in the 2010 U.S. census.
