= Bothamley =

Bothamley is a surname. Notable people with the surname include:

- Grafton Bothamley (1880–1956), Clerk of the New Zealand House of Representatives
- Hilton Bothamley (died 1919), Archdeacon of Bath, England

== See also ==
- Bottomley
