= Dyavaprthivi =

Sanskrit dvandva

Dyavaprthivi is a compound word, referring to a dual devata, that is the merged personification of "heaven and earth". The term occurs 65 times in the Rig Veda. This pair devata has several connotation and meaning in their splinted being such as Dyaus, the Sky Father, and Prthivi, the Earth Mother.

== Etymology ==
Dyavaprthivi is a Sanskrit dvandva, or compound word, meaning "heaven and earth".
