= Crumps Bottom, West Virginia =

Unincorporated community in West Virginia, United States

- Unincorporated community
- Location within West Virginia Location within the United States
- Coordinates: 37°30′30″N 80°50′40″W
- Country: United States
- State: West Virginia
- County: Summers
- Elevation: 1,493 ft (455 m)
- Time zone: UTC-5 (Eastern (EST))
  - Summer (DST): UTC-4 (EDT)
- Area codes: 304 & 681
- GNIS feature ID: 1554234

Crumps Bottom is an unincorporated community in Summers County, West Virginia, United States. Crumps Bottom is located on the New River, south of Hinton. Its post office is closed. It was also known as the Mouth of Indian.

Crumps Bottom was settled in 1753 by Andrew Culbertson, the first English settler in the present Summers County. He established a working plantation with a lavish home. Crumps Botton was the site of the first post office in the area. The settlement was abandoned because of attacks by Native Americans.

The community is now a seasonal-access public area with camping and river access; it can be reached by one-lane roads off West Virginia Route 20.
