= False Bottom Creek =

Stream in South Dakota, U.S.

Coordinates: 44°36′54″N 103°49′08″W

False Bottom Creek is a stream in the U.S. state of South Dakota.

False Bottom Creek was named for the fact that there is a losing stream along some of its course.

== See also ==
- List of rivers of South Dakota
