= The Bottoms (TV series) =

- Genre: Crime drama
- Created by: Jon Bernthal
- Starring: Jon Bernthal
- Country of origin: United States
- Original language: English

Production
- Executive producers: Jon Bernthal; Reinaldo Marcus Green; Brian Kavanaugh-Jones; Rian Cahill; Justin Levy; Fred Berger
- Production company: Range Media Partners

Original release
- Network: FX

The Bottoms is an upcoming television series created by and starring Jon Bernthal for FX.

== Premise ==
The Bottoms will follow the interconnected systems of family structures, friends and neighbors, law enforcement, and criminality all intersecting in Shreveport, Louisiana, in the early ’90s. Set in a particularly wild corner of the Deep South, the show will examine the inflection points, the blurred lines and the human cost on all sides.

— The Hollywood Reporter

== Production ==
=== Development ===
On December 10, 2020, The Hollywood Reporter reported that Amazon Prime Video was developing a crime drama created by and starring Jon Bernthal, titled The Bottoms, whom it was described as a passion project for the actor in which he'll co-write alongside Ben Watkins with Reinaldo Marcus Green directing. Bernthal, Watkins, and Green will executive produce alongside Brian Kavanaugh-Jones, Rian Cahill, Justin Levy, and Fred Berger for Automatik (now Range Media Partners).

On July 16, 2026, in an interview with The Hollywood Reporter, Bernthal revealed that the project has moved to and is in active development at FX while also mentioning that a high-profile writer (most likely Watkins) left because of former's dissatisfaction with the latter's draft.
