= Plum Bottom Creek =

Coordinates: 41°23′13″N 81°23′13″W

Plum Bottom Creek is a stream located entirely within Geauga County, Ohio.

Plum Bottom was named for the wild plum trees along its course.

== See also ==
- List of rivers of Ohio
