= Mossy Bottom, Kentucky =

Unincorporated community in Kentucky, United States

Mossy Bottom
- Home Rule-Class
- Location within the state of Kentucky Mossy Bottom (the United States)
- Coordinates: 37°31′48″N 82°34′46″W
- Country: United States
- State: Kentucky
- County: Pike

Government
  - Type: Commission
- Elevation: 656 ft (200 m)
- Time zone: UTC-5 (Eastern (EST))
  - Summer (DST): UTC-4 (EST)
- ZIP codes: 41501
- GNIS feature ID: 498674

Mossy Bottom is part of Coal Run Village in Pike County, Kentucky, United States.
