= Thompson's Bottom =

Hamlet in the North Kesteven district of Lincolnshire, England

Coordinates: 53.082542°N 0.481309°W

- Location within Lincolnshire
- OS grid reference: TF018550
  - London: 110 mi (180 km) S
- District: North Kesteven
- Shire county: Lincolnshire
- Region: East Midlands
- Country: England
- Sovereign state: United Kingdom
- Postcode district: LN5
- Police: Lincolnshire
- Fire: Lincolnshire
- Ambulance: East Midlands
- UK Parliament: Sleaford and North Hykeham

Thompson's Bottom is a hamlet in the North Kesteven district of Lincolnshire, England. It is situated just under 0.5 miles (0.8 km) west from the A15 road, 10 miles (16 km) south from Lincoln and 6 miles (10 km) north from Sleaford.

The settlement sits immediately to the north of Temple Bruer with Temple High Grange and as elsewhere in the parish is the location of historical buildings, in this case dating from the Eighteenth century. Historic England identifies stables, a coach house and a Grade II listed farmhouse.
