= Pettry Bottom, West Virginia =

Pettry Bottom
- Unincorporated community
- Location within the state of West Virginia Pettry Bottom (the United States)
- Coordinates: 37°52′23″N 81°30′5″W
- Country: United States
- State: West Virginia
- County: Raleigh
- Elevation: 1,063 ft (324 m)
- Time zone: UTC-5 (Eastern (EST))
  - Summer (DST): UTC-4 (EDT)
- GNIS ID: 1555335

Pettry Bottom is an unincorporated community in Raleigh County, West Virginia, United States.
