= Flint Bottom Creek =

Stream in the American state of Missouri

Coordinates: 37.8817198°N 90.1253937°W

Flint Bottom Creek is a stream in Ste. Genevieve County in the U.S. state of Missouri. It is a tributary of River aux Vases.

Flint Bottom Creek was so named on account of flint rock at its river bed.

== See also ==
- List of rivers of Missouri
