= Scott's Bottom Nature Area =

Park in Wyoming, United States

Coordinates: 41°29′47.15″N 109°26′19.21″W

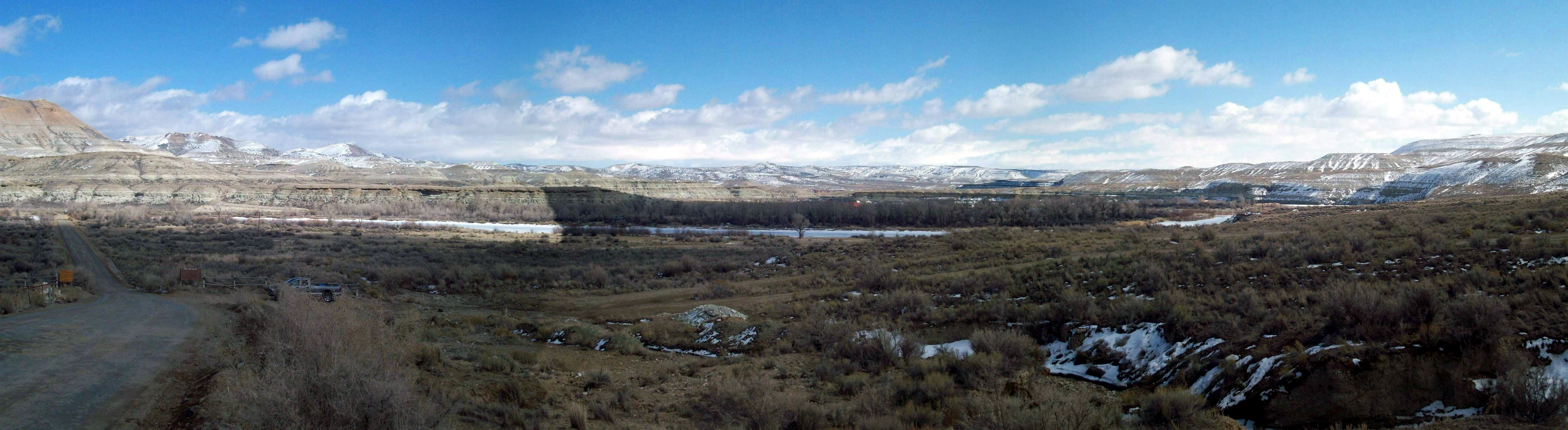
Scott's Bottom, March 2008.

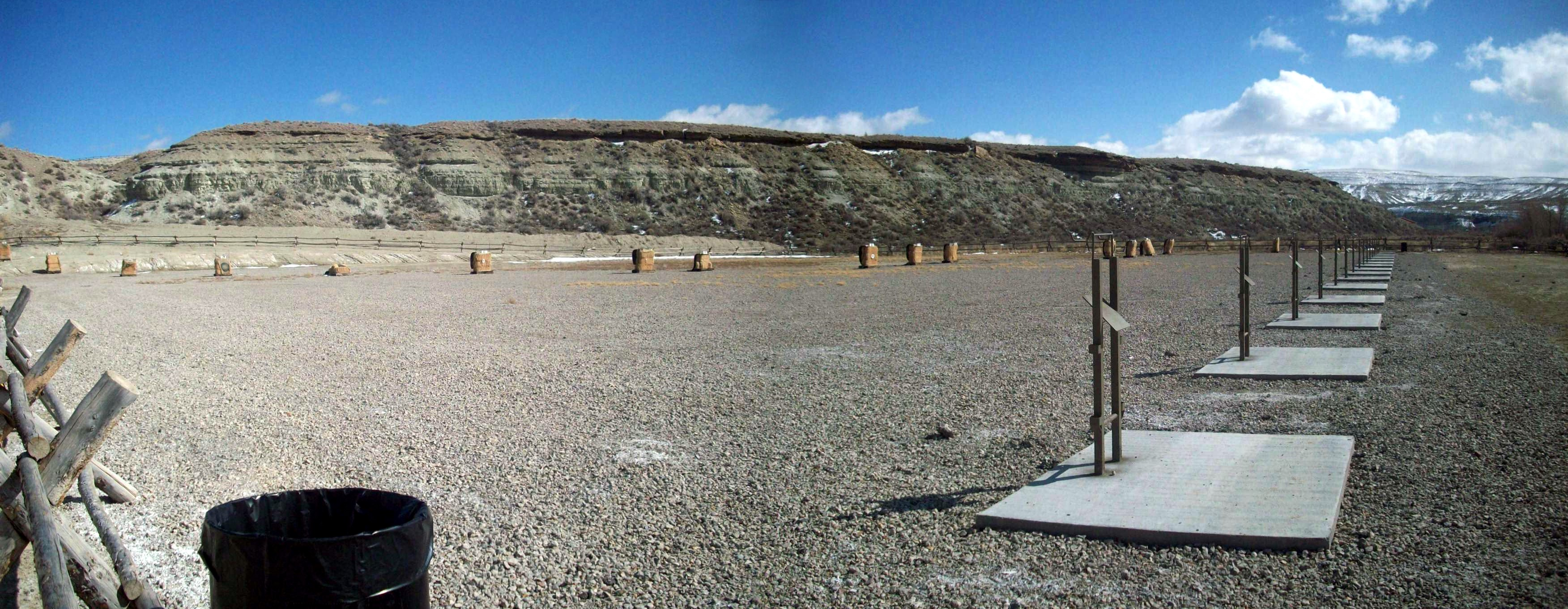
The new outdoor archery range at Scott's Bottom.

Scott's Bottom Nature Area or simply Scott's Bottom is a park located along the Green River in southwestern Wyoming and is maintained by the city of Green River, Wyoming. It offers several trails for recreation as well as an archery range, shooting range, and a small paintball complex that was new as of 2005, however has since been removed. The new outdoor Archery range was built in 2006 and 2007. Scott's Bottom is named for the surrounding few acres, which is simply a wooded area next to the river. There are several other "bottoms" in the area as well. During the warmer months, residents also enjoy fishing in the Green River. Scott's Bottom is also used by local residents with ATVs and other four wheel drive vehicles. Local wildlife in the park include deer, owls, and many other species of animals native to southwestern Wyoming.

Scott's Bottom also goes by the name FMC Park partially named because of a grant from the FMC corporation, which is one of the area's biggest employers.

In 2005, the aging bridge that crosses the river from the city side (and is the park's primary entrance) was replaced with a more stable and secure bridge. In 2010, that bridge is being replaced by a concrete bridge being constructed by the Wyoming Department of transportation. Access to the park begins in Green River on East Teton Blvd. From the west, the park can be accessed via a back road that begins on US 191 southwest of Rock Springs.

== Image gallery ==
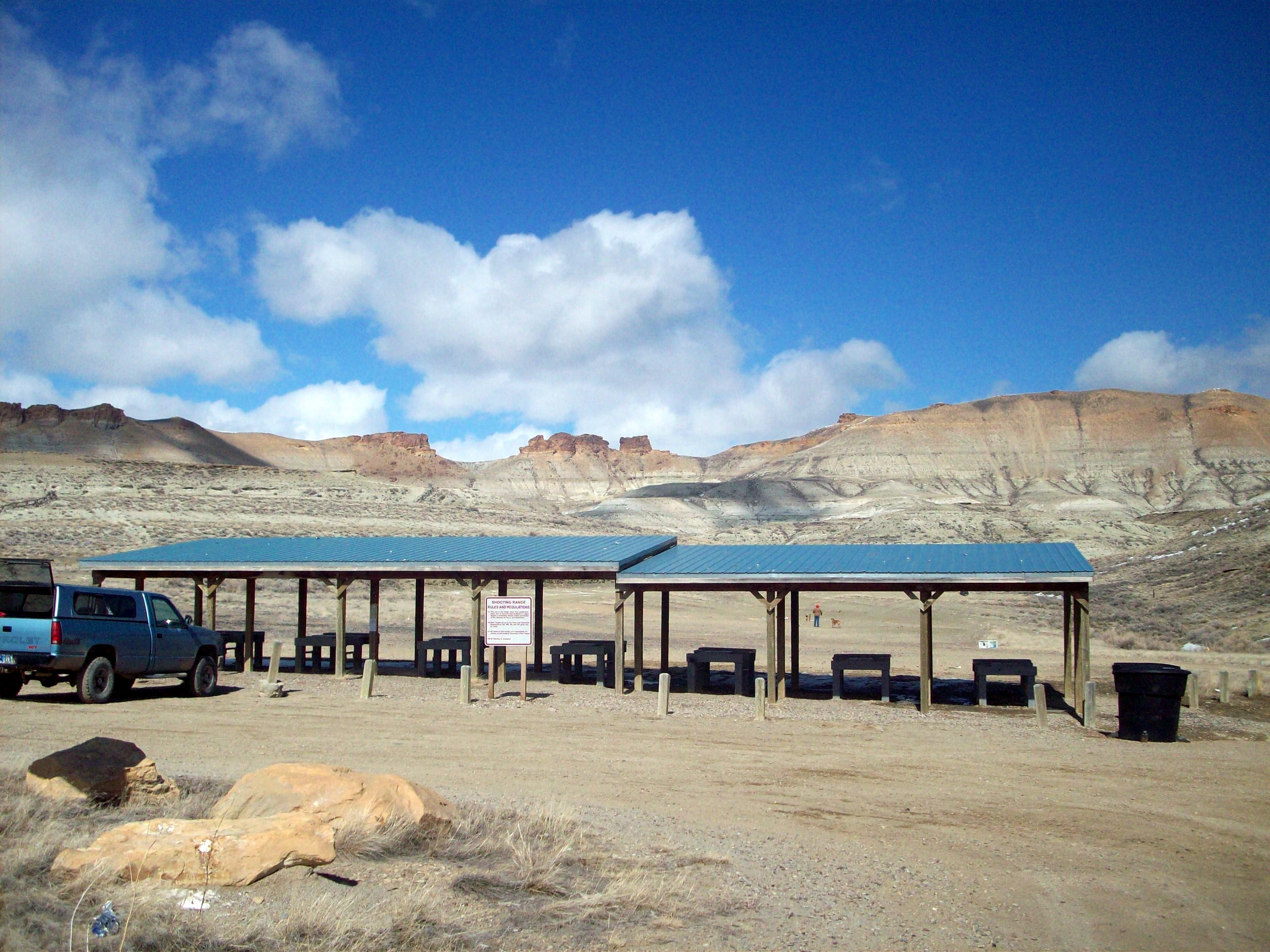
The Carl T. Williams shooting range at Scott's Bottom.

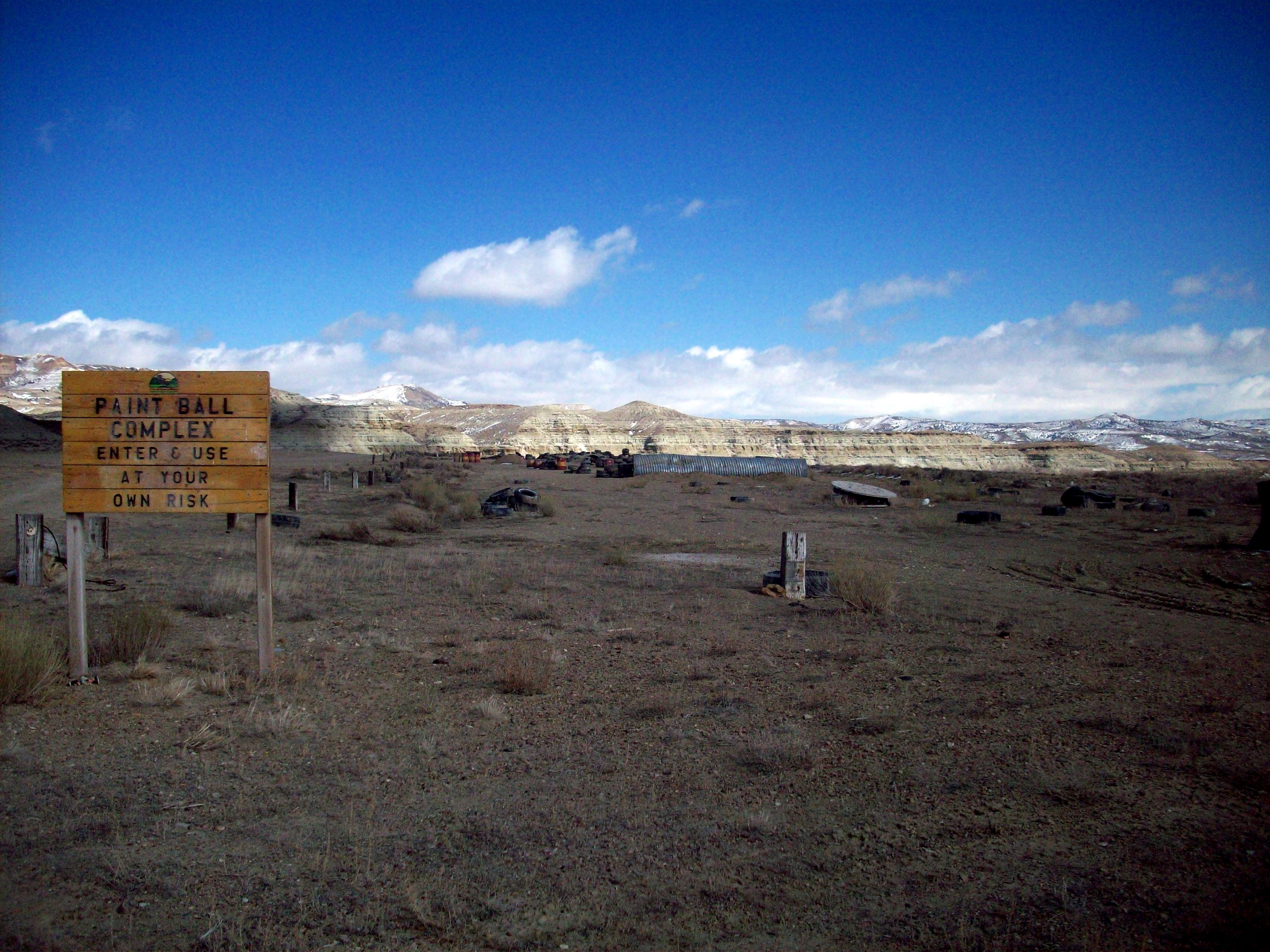
The former Paintball complex at Scott's Bottom.

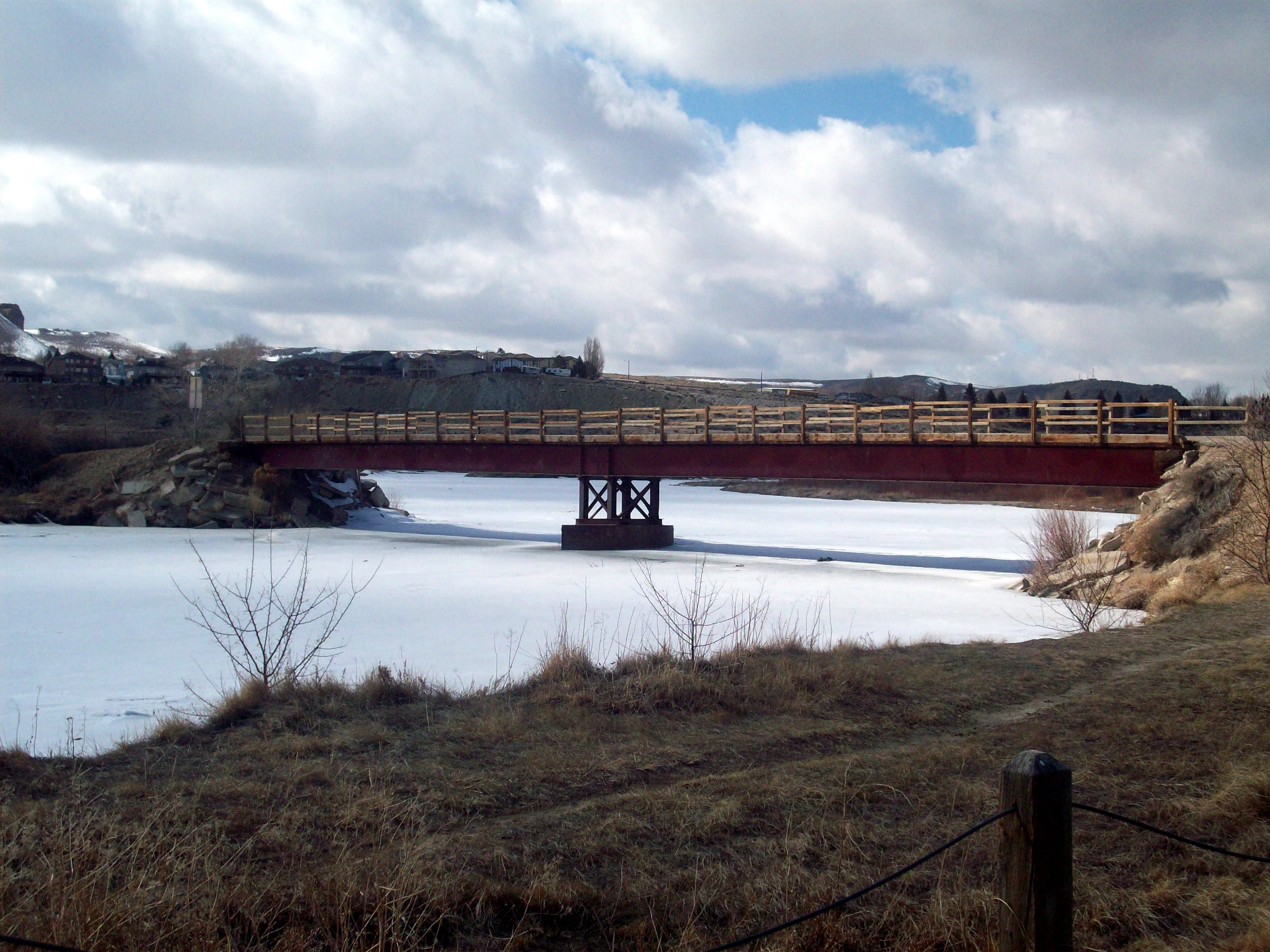
The new bridge over the Green River, replaced in 2005.

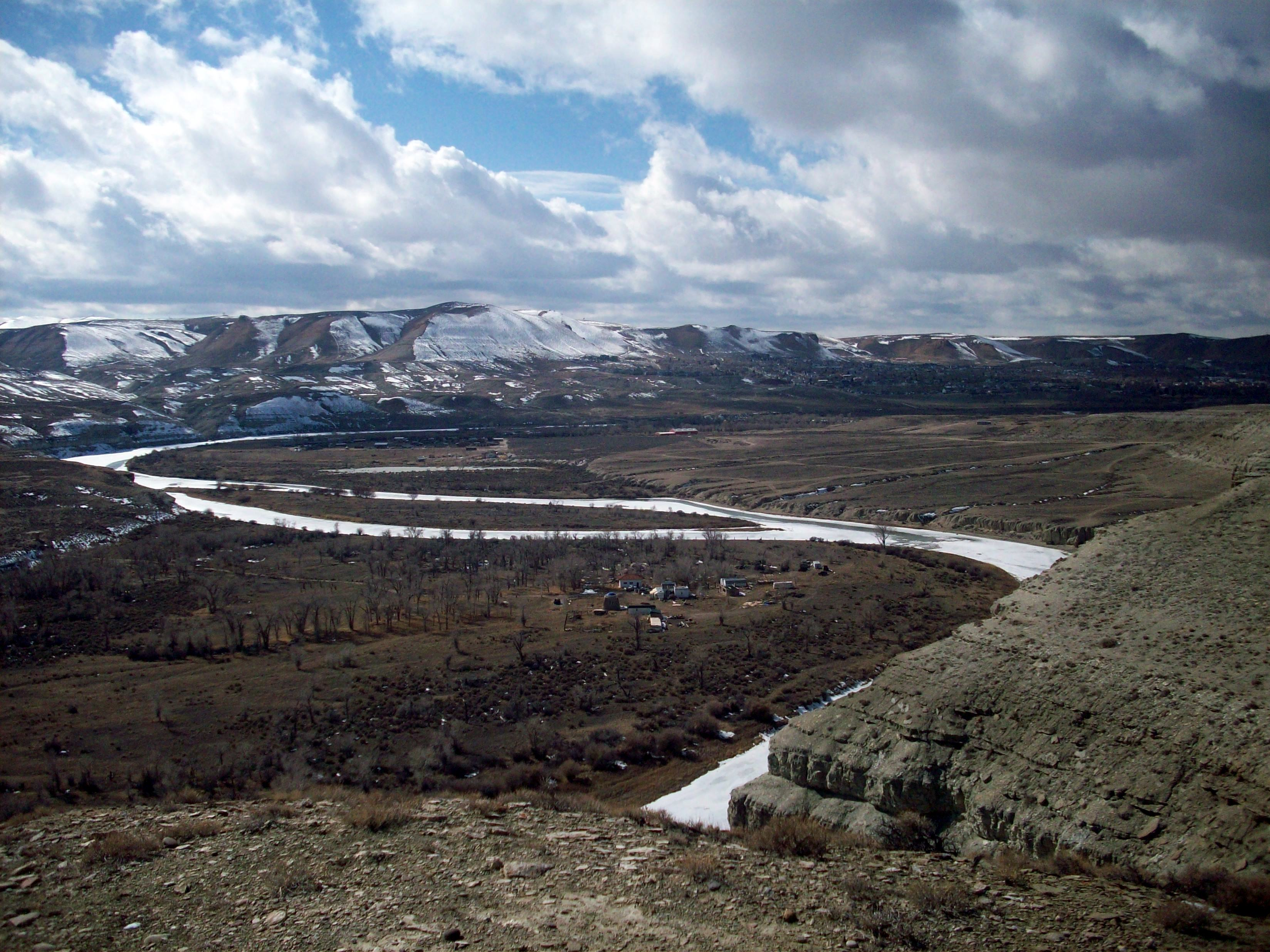
Green River, Wyoming, from the area east of Scott's Bottom.
