= Owslebury Bottom =

Hamlet in Hampshire, England

Coordinates: 51.014804°N 1.267824°W

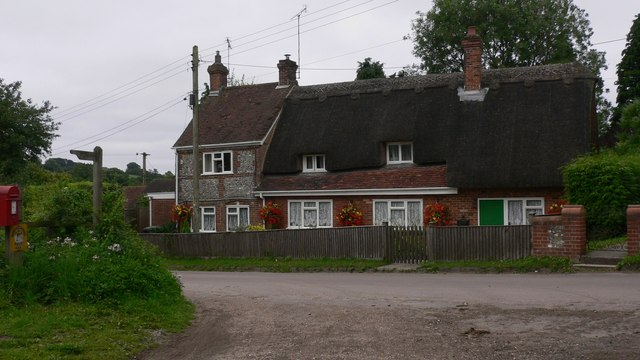
- Cottages at Owslebury Bottom

- Location within Hampshire
- OS grid reference: SU5145824191
- Civil parish: Owslebury
- District: Winchester
- Shire county: Hampshire
- Region: South East
- Country: England
- Sovereign state: United Kingdom
- Post town: WINCHESTER
- Postcode district: SO21
- Police: Hampshire and Isle of Wight
- Fire: Hampshire and Isle of Wight
- Ambulance: South Central
- UK Parliament: Winchester

Owslebury Bottom is a hamlet in the civil parish of Owslebury in the City of Winchester district of Hampshire, England. Its nearest town is Winchester, which lies approximately 4.2 miles (7 km) north-west from the village. William Cobbett rode through the hamlet in his 1820s book Rural Rides. He described it as "half a dozen timbered houses in the ownership of Lord Mildmay, a small church of recent construction, and a tract of good soil used to cultivate wheat, being of good quality, of which the majority is milled at the City Mill in Winchester".

== History ==
It is served by a bus from Winchester around once every two hours.
