= West Bottom, Virginia =

Unincorporated community in Virginia, United States

Coordinates: 37°43′02″N 78°15′39″W

West Bottom is an unincorporated community in Fluvanna County, in the U.S. state of Virginia. West Bottom has historically been an African American community.
