= Locust Bottom =

Historic house in Virginia, United States

- U.S. National Register of Historic Places
- U.S. Historic district
- Virginia Landmarks Register
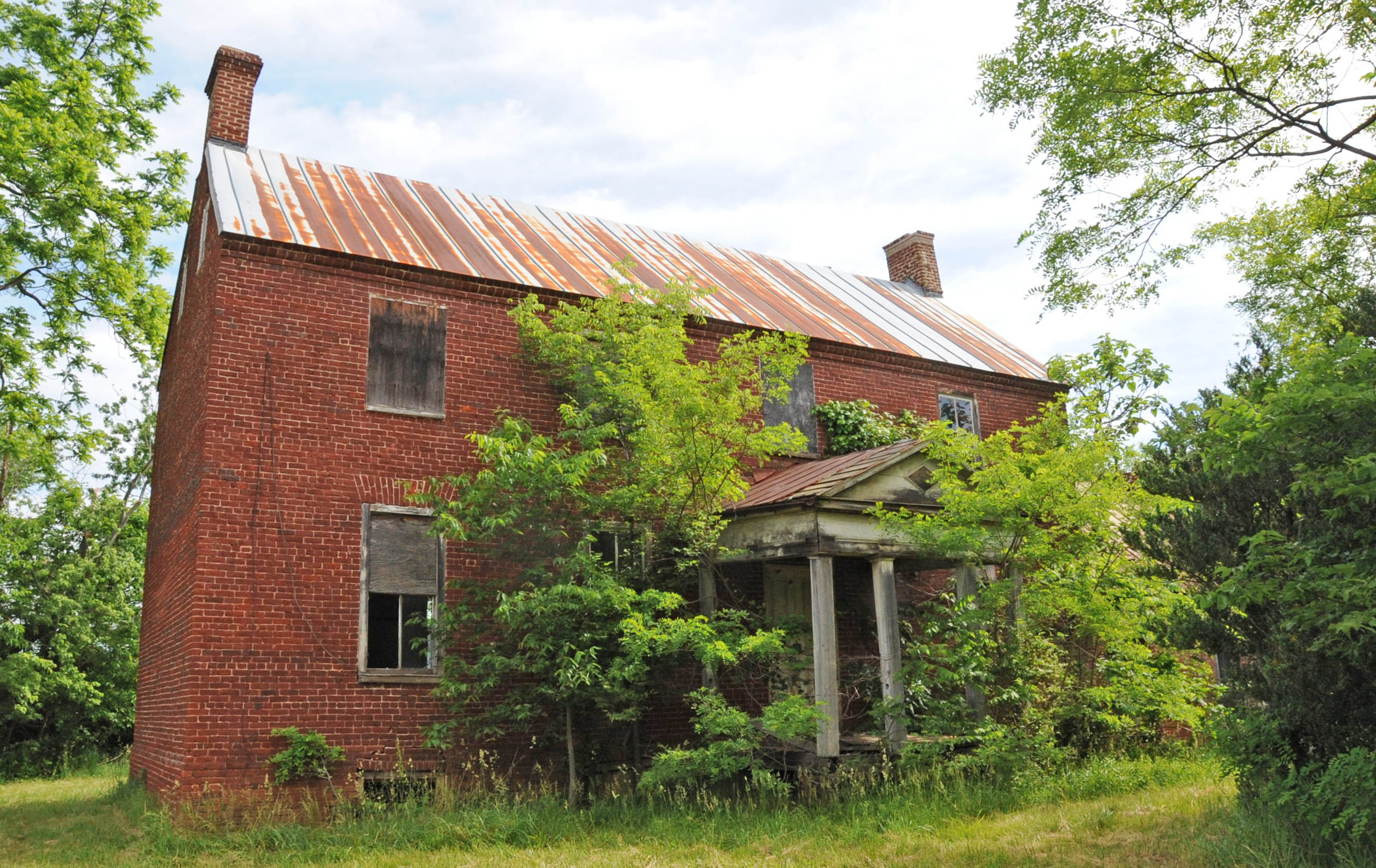
- Main house

- Location within Northern Virginia Location within Virginia Location within the United States
- Location: 2520 Logmill Rd., near Haymarket, Virginia
- Coordinates: 38°53′34″N 77°38′26″W
- Area: 199 acres (81 ha)
- Built: 1811
- Architectural style: Federal
- NRHP reference No.: 89001796
- VLR No.: 076-0088

Significant dates
- Added to NRHP: February 11, 1991
- Designated VLR: December 13, 1988

Locust Bottom, also known as Rollingwood Farm, is a historic home and national historic district located near Haymarket, Prince William County, Virginia. The main house was built about 1811, and is a two-story, four-bay, Federal style, brick dwelling with a single-pile, modified central-hall plan. It has end chimneys, a metal gable roof, a molded brick cornice, and a kitchen wing which predates the main house. The two-story rear frame addition was added in the late-19th century. Also included in the district are the shop, the carriage house, the two chicken houses, the brooder house, the milk house, the horse barn, the tenant house, corn crib, and the remains of a smokehouse.

It was added to the National Register of Historic Places in 1989.
