= Clabber Bottom, Kentucky =

Unincorporated community in Kentucky, United States

Clabber Bottom
- Unincorporated community
- Location within the state of Kentucky Clabber Bottom (the United States)
- Coordinates: 38°11′37″N 84°31′28″W
- Country: United States
- State: Kentucky
- County: Scott
- Elevation: 833 ft (254 m)
- Time zone: UTC-5 (Eastern (EST))
  - Summer (DST): UTC-4 (EDT)
- GNIS feature ID: 516988

Clabber Bottom is an unincorporated community located in Scott County, Kentucky, United States.
