= Bottom =

Bottom may refer to:

== Anatomy and sex ==
- Bottom, the partner in BDSM who takes the passive, receiving, or obedient role, to that of the top or dominant
- Bottom, the partner who usually receives penetration in a gay relationship
- Buttocks or bottom, part of the anatomy on the posterior of the pelvic region of apes and humans, and many other bipeds or quadrupeds

== Arts, entertainment, and media ==
- Bottom (TV series), a British sitcom and stage show
- "Bottom", a song by Puddle of Mudd from Life on Display
- "Bottom", a song by Tool from Undertow
- Bottom, a 2011 film by Todd Verow
- Nick Bottom, a character from Shakespeare's A Midsummer Night's Dream
- The Bottoms (novel), a 2000 novel by Joe R. Lansdale
- Bottoms, a 1966 film by Yoko Ono
- Bottoms (film), a 2023 film by Emma Seligman

== Geography ==
- Bottom (valley), the floor of a valley
  - List of geographical bottoms, list of geographical features called "bottom"
- Bottomland (freshwater ecology), low-lying alluvial land adjacent to a river
- Foggy Bottom, a neighborhood in Washington, D.C.
- Lower Bottoms, Oakland, California or The Bottoms, a neighborhood in Oakland, California, U.S.
- St. Paul's Bottoms or The Bottoms, a neighborhood in Shreveport, Louisiana
- Seabed, the floor of the ocean or ocean bottom
- Stream bed, the channel bottom of a stream, river or creek
- The Bottom, capital of the island of Saba
- The Bottom (neighborhood in Dallas, Texas), a neighborhood in the Tenth Street Freedman's Town in Dallas, Texas, U.S.
- The Bottom, a neighborhood in Knoxville, Tennessee, U.S.
- The Bottoms, a neighborhood in Franklinton (Columbus, Ohio), U.S.

== Mathematics ==
- Bottom, or falsum, a contradiction in logic and Boolean algebra
- Bottom element, in lattice theory and related branches of mathematics
- Bottom type, in type theory (the bottom element in the subtype relation)
- The symbol up tack (⊥), used to represent these concepts

== People ==
- Bottom (surname), people with the surname Bottom
- Bottoms (surname), people with the surname Bottoms

== Other uses ==
- Bottom (technical analysis), a chart pattern in the technical analysis of securities
- Bottom quark, a subatomic particle
- Trousers, Shorts and other "bottom wear", pieces of clothing to cover the lower portion of the body, particularly the legs.

== See also ==
- Bott
- Bottoming (disambiguation)
- Bottomry
