= Longbottom =

Longbottom is an English surname; notable persons with the name include:

- Arthur Longbottom (footballer) (1933–2023), English footballer
- Arthur Longbottom (politician) (1883–1943), Labour Party politician in the United Kingdom
- Bruce Longbottom (born 1964), Australian professional rugby league footballer
- Charles Longbottom (1930–2013), British barrister, businessman and politician
- George Longbottom (born 1961), Australian rugby league player
- Julia Longbottom (born 1963), British diplomat and Ambassador of the United Kingdom to Japan
- Kevin Longbottom (1940–1986), Aboriginal Australian professional rugby league footballer
- Kieran Longbottom (born 1985), Australian rugby union footballer
- Maggie Longbottom, married name Margaret Wintringham (1879–1955), British Liberal Party politician
- Maurice Longbottom (born 1995), Australian rugby league and rugby union player
- Maurice Longbottom (RAF officer) Spitfire photo reconnaissance pioneer
- Peter Longbottom (1959–1998), British cyclist
- Robert Longbottom (born 1957), New York City-based director, choreographer and director
- Will Longbottom (born 1998), English professional footballer

== Fictional characters ==
- Longbottom family in J.K.Rowling's Harry Potter series
  - Alice Longbottom
  - Frank Longbottom
  - Augusta Longbottom
  - Neville Longbottom

== See also ==
- Longbottom, a region of the Shire in J. R. R. Tolkien's fictional Middle-earth
- Bottom (surname)
