= Bottoms (surname) =

Bottoms is a surname. Notable people with this surname include:

- Benjamin A. Bottoms, U.S. coast guardsman who died during a rescue attempt in Greenland
- Joseph Bottoms, American actor
- Keisha Lance Bottoms, American politician and mayor of Atlanta
- Sam Bottoms, American actor
- Scott Bottoms, American politician and pastor from Colorado
- Timothy Bottoms, American actor

== See also ==
- Bottom (surname)
