= Dorothy Rouse Bottom =

American newspaper editor

Dorothy Eva Rouse Bottom
- Born: May 17, 1896; Newport News, Virginia
- Died: December 15, 1990 (aged 94); Hampton, Hampton City, Virginia
- Occupation: newspaper editor

Dorothy Eva Rouse Bottom (May 17, 1896 – December 15, 1990) was an American newspaper editor and civic leader.

== Early life and education ==
She was born to William Elmer Rouse, a funeral director, and Edna Sue Hudgins Rouse, a schoolteacher. She was their only child. She attended Mary Baldwin Seminary in 1914. Her mother's parents ran a boarding house which was where she met Raymond Bottom. She married him on July 2, 1925. He was in the army and the couple lived in the United States and in the Philippines until his resignation in 1930 when they settled in Hampton, Virginia. They had one son and two daughters: Raymond Jr., Dorthy and Barbara. Raymond Sr. died suddenly in 1953.

== Newspaper career ==
After the death of her husband, Rouse Bottom took over his job as vice president and business manager of the Daily Press, Inc. the company which owned and published two daily newspapers in Newport News, the morning Daily Press and the evening Times-Herald. She also took over as editor of the Daily Press. Her initial work was to increase coverage of society news and women's organizations, while she herself became more of a civic booster, supporting tourism in Virginia. The newspaper would also frequently come out against federal regulations and civil rights, though these positions changed somewhat around the 1970s.

She became CEO of Daily Press, Inc. in 1964. She was elected president of the United Press International Virginia Association of Newspapers in 1961 and she was made a life member of the Virginia Press Association, an organization she and her husband had helped start, in 1981. She retired from editing in 1981, succeeded by her son Raymond Blanton Bottom Jr. as editor of the Daily Press. She stepped down from the board of directors in 1986. Upon her retirement the Virginia General Assembly adopted a resolution honoring her as "a great contributor to the commonwealth." The Daily Press's circulation grew from 25,810 to 58,280 during her tenure.

== Civic work ==
Rouse Bottom was instrumental in soliciting funds to erect the Victory Arch in Newport News in 1962 which replaced a temporary wooden arch erected in 1919 to honoring servicemen returning from World War I. She continued her husband's work in the Virginia Travel Council, an organization her husband had helped found. She established the Rouse-Bottom Foundation to support cultural, historical, environmental, and educational activities in Virginia in 1989.

== Death and legacy ==
Rouse Bottom died from a stroke in 1989 and is buried in Greenlawn Cemetery. Daily Press, Inc. was sold to a national syndicate in 1986—including broadcasting and other associated investments—for more than $200 million. She established the Raymond B. And Dorothy Rouse Bottom Scholarship at Hampden-Sydney College, Raymond Jr.'s alma mater.
