= Davis Bottom, Lexington =

Davis Bottom
- Neighborhood of Lexington, Kentucky
- Interactive map of Davis Bottom
- Coordinates: 38.047°N 84.509°W
- Country: United States
- State: Kentucky
- County: Fayette
- City: Lexington

Area
  - Total: 0.017 sq mi (0.044 km^{2})
  - Water: 0 sq mi (0.0 km^{2})

Population (2000)
  - Total: 36
  - Density: 2,143/sq mi (827/km^{2})
- Time zone: UTC-5 (Eastern (EST))
  - Summer (DST): UTC-4 (EDT)
- ZIP code: 40508
- Area code: 859

Davis Bottom is a neighborhood just southwest of downtown Lexington, Kentucky, United States. Its boundaries are Broadway to the south, Norfolk Southern railroad tracks to the west, High Street to the north, and Maxwell Street to the east. The area is also referred to as Davistown.

The area has seen a boon in development in recent years as several abandoned tobacco warehouses have been razed with new condominiums built in their place. The Newtown Pike Extension is being built along the neighborhood's southern tier which has caused the displacement of many of the residents.

== Neighborhood statistics ==
- Population: in 2000: 36
- Area: 0.017 square miles (0.044 km^{2})
- Population density: 2,143 people per square mile
- Median household income (2010): $24,229
