= Round Bottom, West Virginia =

Round Bottom
- Unincorporated community
- Location within the state of West Virginia Round Bottom (the United States)
- Coordinates: 39°41′59″N 80°26′8″W
- Country: United States
- State: West Virginia
- County: Wetzel
- Elevation: 1,089 ft (332 m)
- Time zone: UTC-5 (Eastern (EST))
  - Summer (DST): UTC-4 (EDT)
- GNIS ID: 1546102

Round Bottom is an unincorporated community in Wetzel County, West Virginia, United States.
