= Higginbottom =

Higginbottom is a surname of English origin. It is a corruption of Oakenbottom, a place in Bolton-le-Moors, probably influenced by the dialect word hickin or higgin, the mountain ash.

Notable people with the surname include:

- Edward Higginbottom (born 1946), British choral director
- Frederick Higginbottom (1859–1943), British journalist and newspaper editor
- Heather Higginbottom (born c. 1972), American politician
- Jake Higginbottom (born 1993), Australian professional golfer
- Sam Higginbottom (1874–1958), English-born American missionary to India, founder of the Allahabad Agricultural Institute
