= Second Battle of Bull Run =

1862 American Civil War battle

Second Battle of Bull Run (Battle of Second Manassas)
- Part of the American Civil War
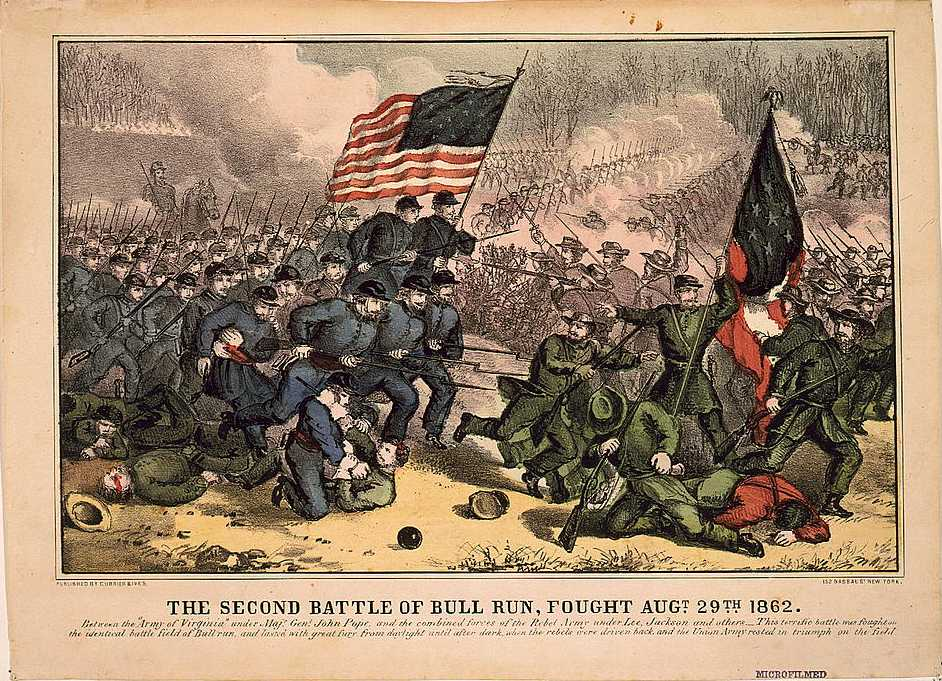
- Second Battle of Bull Run, fought Augt. 29th 1862, 1860s lithograph by Currier and Ives
Date	August 28–30, 1862 (Note: The National Park Service has established these dates for the battle. The references by Greene, Hennessy, Salmon, and Kennedy (whose works are closely aligned with the NPS) adopt these dates as well. However, all of the other references to this article specify that the action on August 28 was a battle separate from the Second Battle of Bull Run. Some of these authors name the action on August 28 the Battle of Groveton, Brawner's Farm, or Gainesville.)
Location	Prince William County, Virginia 38°48′45″N 77°31′17″W
Result	Confederate victory

Belligerents
United States	CSA

Commanders and leaders
John Pope; Franz Sigel	Robert E. Lee

Units involved
Army of Virginia; Army of the Potomac: III Corps; V Corps; VI Corps (Note: Only First Brigade from First Division. No other troops of the VI Corps were in action during the Northern Virginia campaign.); IX Corps; Kanawha Division (detachment)	Army of Northern Virginia

Strength
77,000 (estimated): (Note: 75,000 according to Ballard-Arthur.): 51,000 (Army of Virginia); 26,000 (Army of the Potomac: III, V, VI, IX Corps; Kanawha Division); 62,000 engaged (estimated)	50,000

Casualties and losses
14,462 (Note: Union: 13,830; Confederate: 8,350, according to National Park Service. Greene cites ~ 10,000 Union casualties (killed/wounded); ~ 1,300 Confederates killed and ~ 7,000 wounded. Most published figures for casualties are for the entire Northern Virginia campaign, including the significant battles of Cedar Mountain and Chantilly. The campaign casualties reported by Eicher are: Union 16,054 (1,724 killed, 8,372 wounded, 5,958 captured/missing); Confederate 9,197 (1,481 killed, 7,627 wounded, 89 captured/missing). See reference in: Northern Virginia campaign.) 1,747 killed 8,452 wounded 4,263 captured/missing	7,298 1,096 killed 6,202 wounded

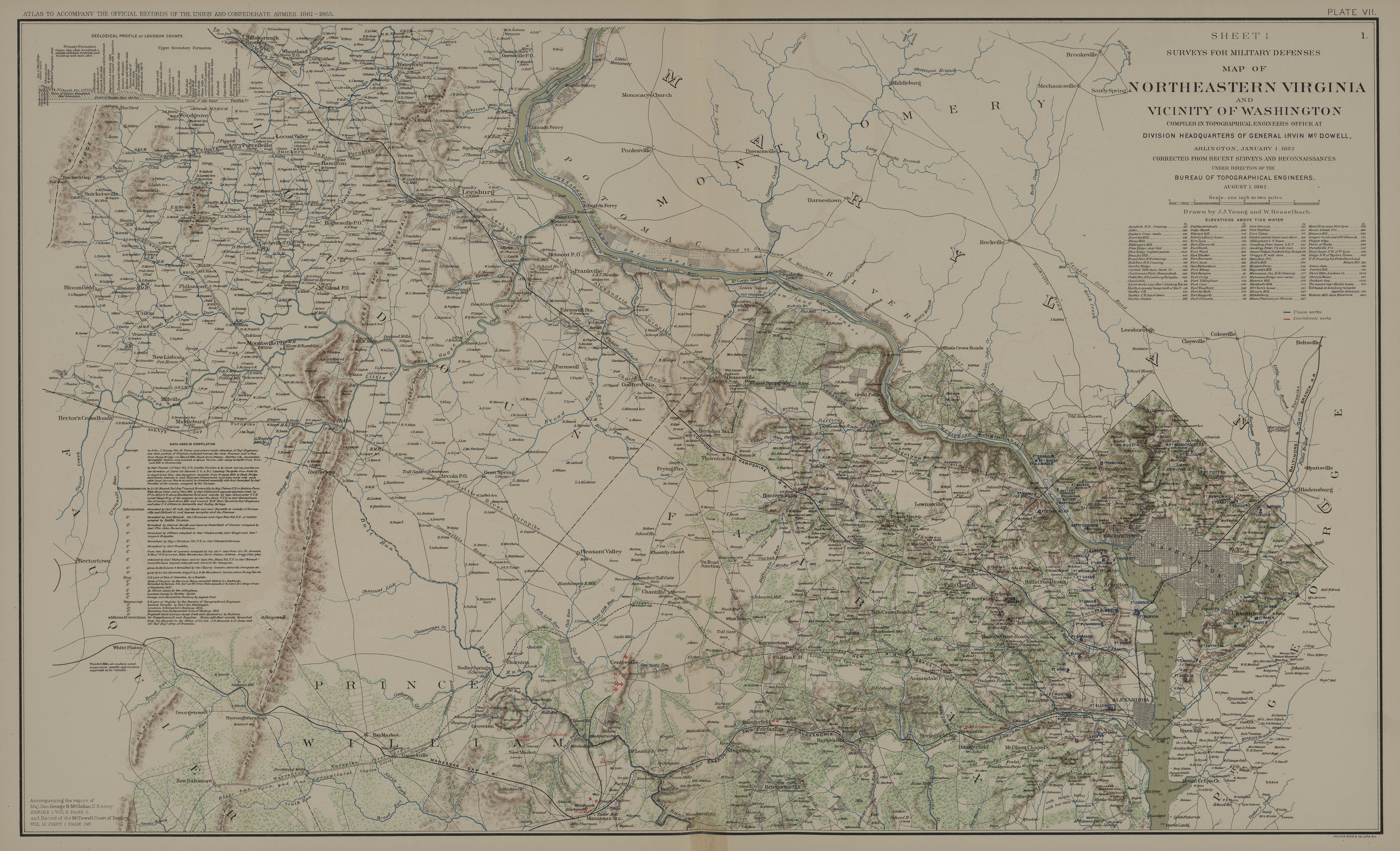
Northeastern Virginia (1862)

The Second Battle of Bull Run or Battle of Second Manassas was fought August 28–30, 1862, in Prince William County, Virginia, as part of the American Civil War. It was the culmination of the Northern Virginia campaign waged by Confederate Gen. Robert E. Lee's Army of Northern Virginia against Union Maj. Gen. John Pope's Army of Virginia, and a battle of much larger scale and numbers than the First Battle of Bull Run (or First Manassas) fought on July 21, 1861, on the same ground.

Following a wide-ranging flanking march, Confederate Maj. Gen. Thomas J. "Stonewall" Jackson captured the Union supply depot at Manassas Junction, threatening Pope's line of communications with Washington, D.C. Withdrawing a few miles to the northwest, Jackson took up strong concealed defensive positions on Stony Ridge and awaited the arrival of the wing of Lee's army commanded by Maj. Gen. James Longstreet. On August 28, 1862, Jackson attacked a Union column just east of Gainesville, at Brawner's Farm, resulting in a stalemate but successfully getting Pope's attention. On that same day, Longstreet broke through light Union resistance in the Battle of Thoroughfare Gap and approached the battlefield.

Pope became convinced that he had trapped Jackson and concentrated the bulk of his army against him. On August 29, Pope launched a series of assaults against Jackson's position along an unfinished railroad grade. The attacks were repulsed with heavy casualties on both sides. At noon, Longstreet arrived on the field from Thoroughfare Gap and took position on Jackson's right flank. On August 30, Pope renewed his attacks, seemingly unaware that Longstreet was on the field. When massed Confederate artillery devastated a Union assault by Maj. Gen. Fitz John Porter's V Corps, Longstreet's wing of 25,000 men in five divisions counterattacked in the largest simultaneous mass assault of the war. (Note: There were Confederate offensives in the war that employed more men—57,000 at Gaines' Mill, for instance—but they involved multiple, piecemeal attacks over longer periods.) The Union left flank was crushed and the army was driven back to Bull Run. Only an effective Union rear guard action prevented a replay of the First Manassas defeat. Pope's retreat to Centreville was nonetheless precipitous.

Success in this battle emboldened Lee to initiate the ensuing Maryland campaign.

== Background ==
=== Military situation ===
After the collapse of Maj. Gen. George B. McClellan's Peninsula campaign in the Seven Days Battles of June 1862, President Abraham Lincoln appointed John Pope to command the newly formed Army of Virginia. Pope had achieved some success in the Western Theater, and Lincoln sought a more aggressive general than McClellan.

=== Plans ===
Pope's mission was to fulfill two basic objectives: protect Washington and the Shenandoah Valley; and draw Confederate forces away from McClellan by moving in the direction of Gordonsville. Based on his experience fighting McClellan in the Seven Days, Robert E. Lee perceived that McClellan was no further threat to him on the Virginia Peninsula, so he felt no compulsion to keep all of his forces in direct defense of Richmond. This allowed him to relocate Jackson to Gordonsville to block Pope and protect the Virginia Central Railroad.

Lee had larger plans in mind. Since the Union army was split between McClellan and Pope and they were widely separated, Lee saw an opportunity to destroy Pope before returning his attention to McClellan. He committed Maj. Gen. A.P. Hill to join Jackson with 12,000 men.

=== Initial movements in the Northern Virginia campaign ===
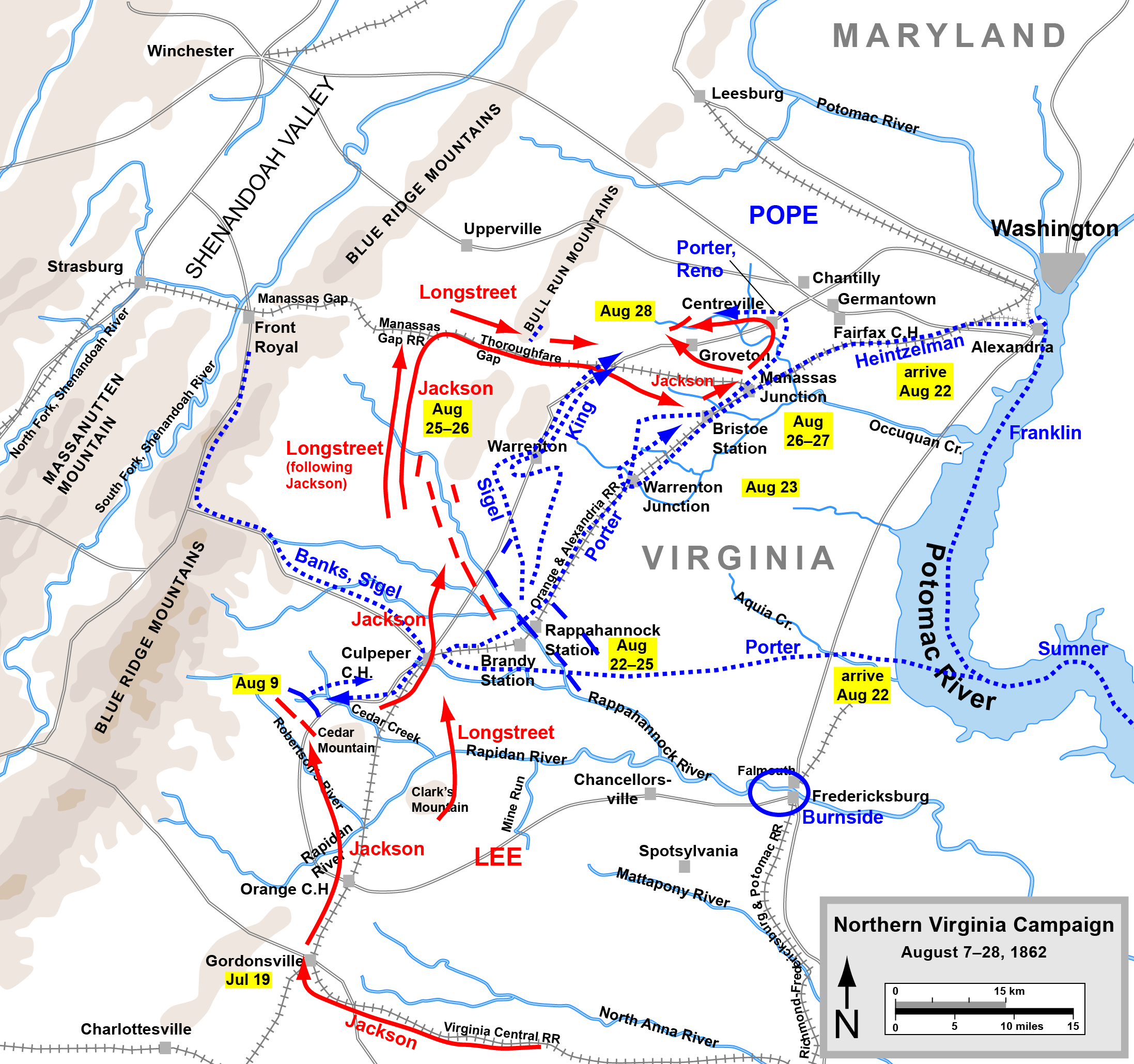
Northern Virginia campaign, August 7–28, 1862 Confederate Union

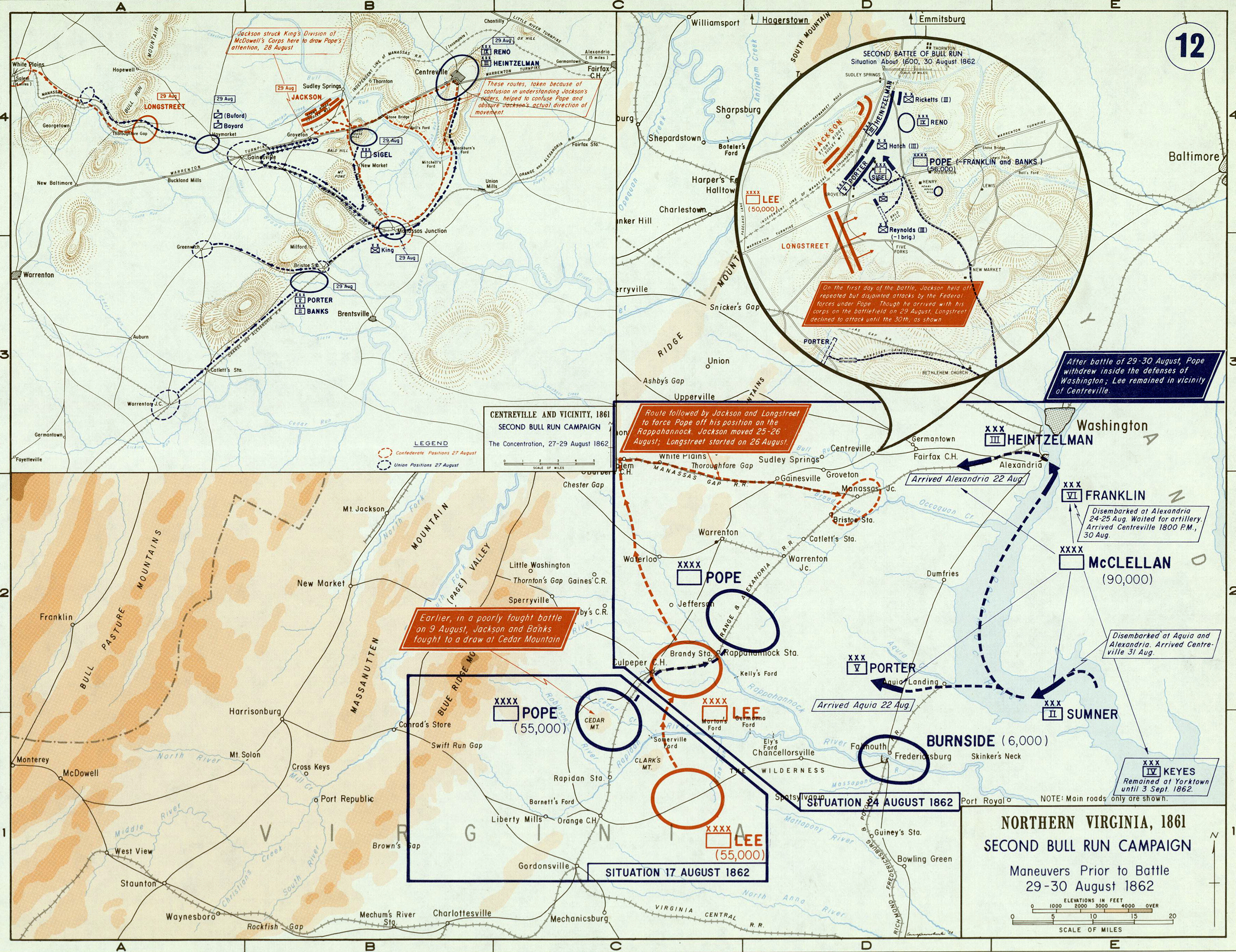
Second Bull Run campaign, August 17–30, 1862 (Additional map).

On August 3, General-in-Chief Henry Halleck directed McClellan to begin his final withdrawal from the Peninsula and to return to Northern Virginia to support Pope. McClellan protested and did not begin his redeployment until August 14.

On August 9, Nathaniel Banks's corps attacked Jackson at Cedar Mountain, gaining an early advantage, but a Confederate counterattack led by A.P. Hill drove Banks back across Cedar Creek. Jackson's advance was stopped, however, by the Union division of Brig. Gen. James B. Ricketts. By now Jackson had learned that Pope's corps were all together, foiling his plan of defeating each in separate actions. He remained in position until August 12, then withdrew to Gordonsville. On August 13, Lee sent Longstreet to reinforce Jackson.

=== Prelude to battle ===
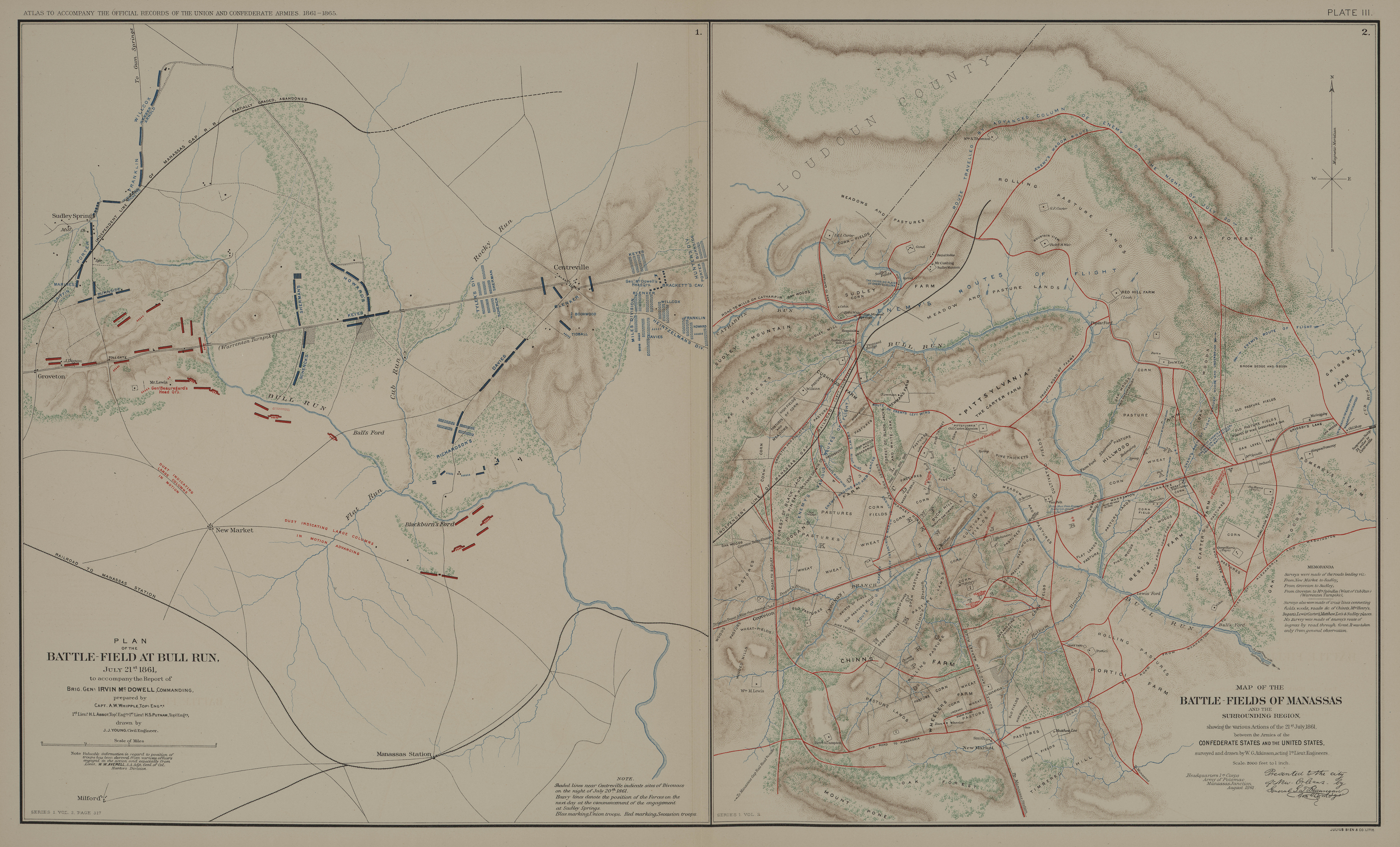
Battlefield of Manassas (right side), produced in 1861 with labels from a Confederate perspective of First Manassas

From August 22 to 25, the two armies fought a series of minor actions along the Rappahannock River. Heavy rains had swollen the river and Lee was unable to force a crossing. By this time, reinforcements from the Army of the Potomac were arriving from the Peninsula. Lee's new plan in the face of all these additional forces outnumbering him was to send Jackson and Stuart with half of the army on a flanking march to cut Pope's line of communication, the Orange & Alexandria Railroad. Pope would be forced to retreat and could be defeated while moving and vulnerable. Jackson departed on August 25 and reached Salem (present-day Marshall) that night.

On the evening of August 26, after passing around Pope's right flank via Thoroughfare Gap, Jackson's wing of the army struck the Orange & Alexandria Railroad at Bristoe Station and before daybreak on August 27 marched to capture and destroy the massive Union supply depot at Manassas Junction. This surprise movement forced Pope into an abrupt retreat from his defensive line along the Rappahannock. During the night of August 27–28, Jackson marched his divisions north to the First Bull Run (Manassas) battlefield, where he took position behind an unfinished railroad grade below Stony Ridge. The defensive position was a good one. The heavy woods allowed the Confederates to conceal themselves, while maintaining good observation points of the Warrenton Turnpike, the likely avenue of Union movement, only a few hundred yards to the south. There were good approach roads for Longstreet to join Jackson, or for Jackson to retreat to the Bull Run Mountains if he could not be reinforced in time. Finally, the unfinished railroad grade offered cuts and fills that could be used as ready-made entrenchments.

In the Battle of Thoroughfare Gap on August 28, Longstreet's wing broke through light Union resistance and marched through the gap to join Jackson. This seemingly inconsequential action virtually ensured Pope's defeat during the coming battles because it allowed the two wings of Lee's army to unite on the Manassas battlefield.

== Opposing forces ==
=== Union ===
Key commanders (Union Forces)
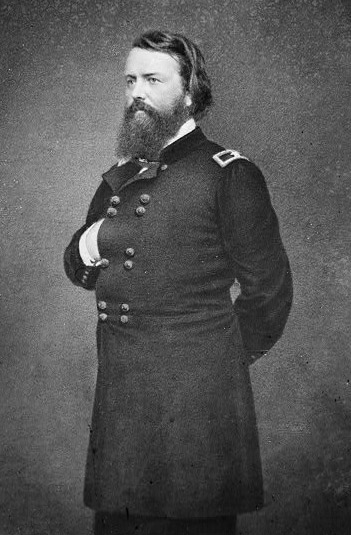
Maj. Gen.
John Pope, Army of Virginia (Commanding), USA

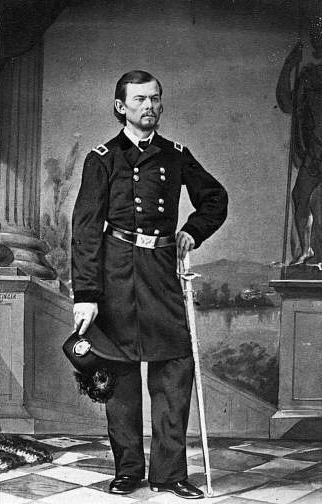
Maj. Gen.
Franz Sigel (I Corps, Army of Virginia), USA

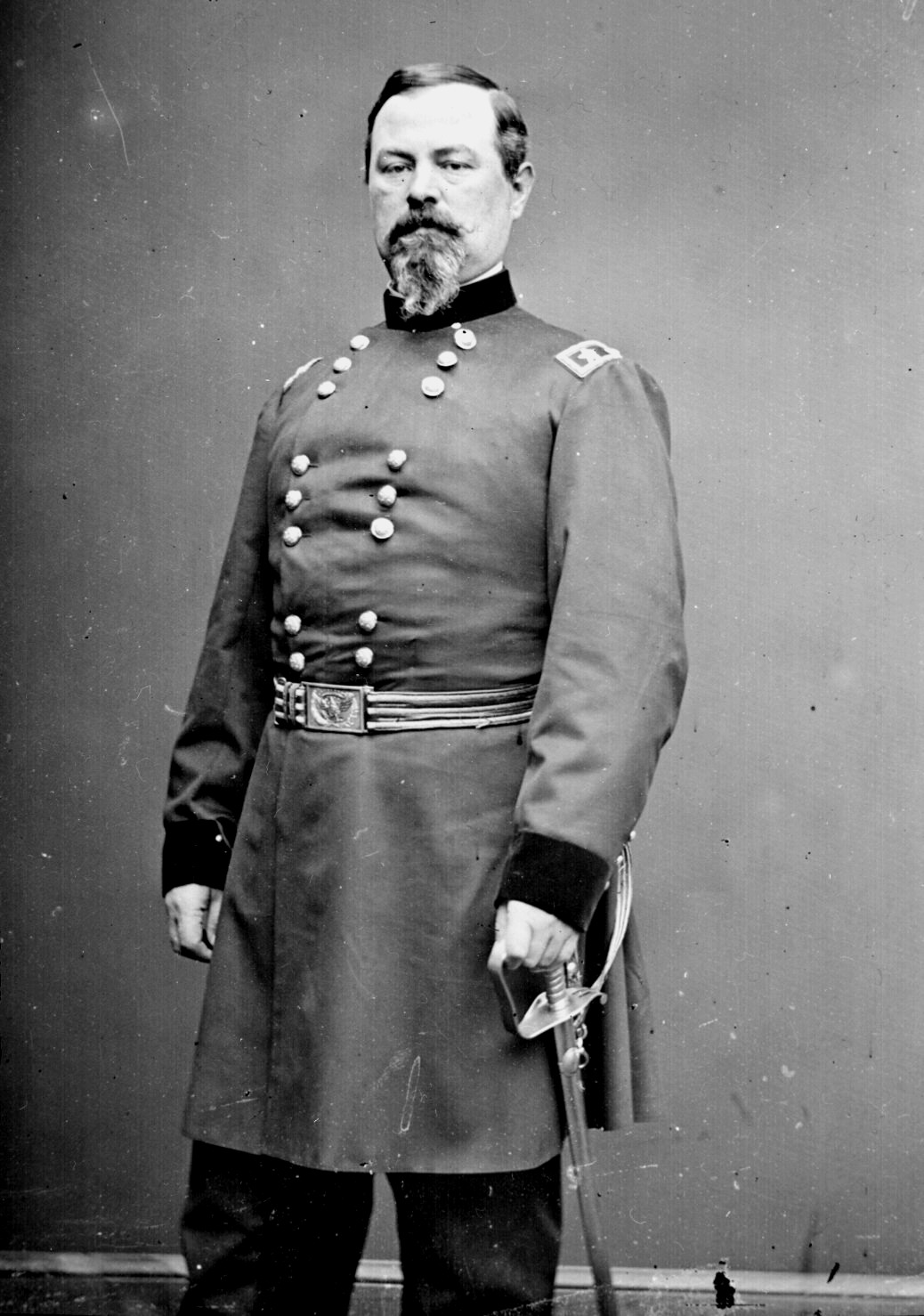
Maj. Gen.
Irvin McDowell (III Corps, Army of Virginia), USA

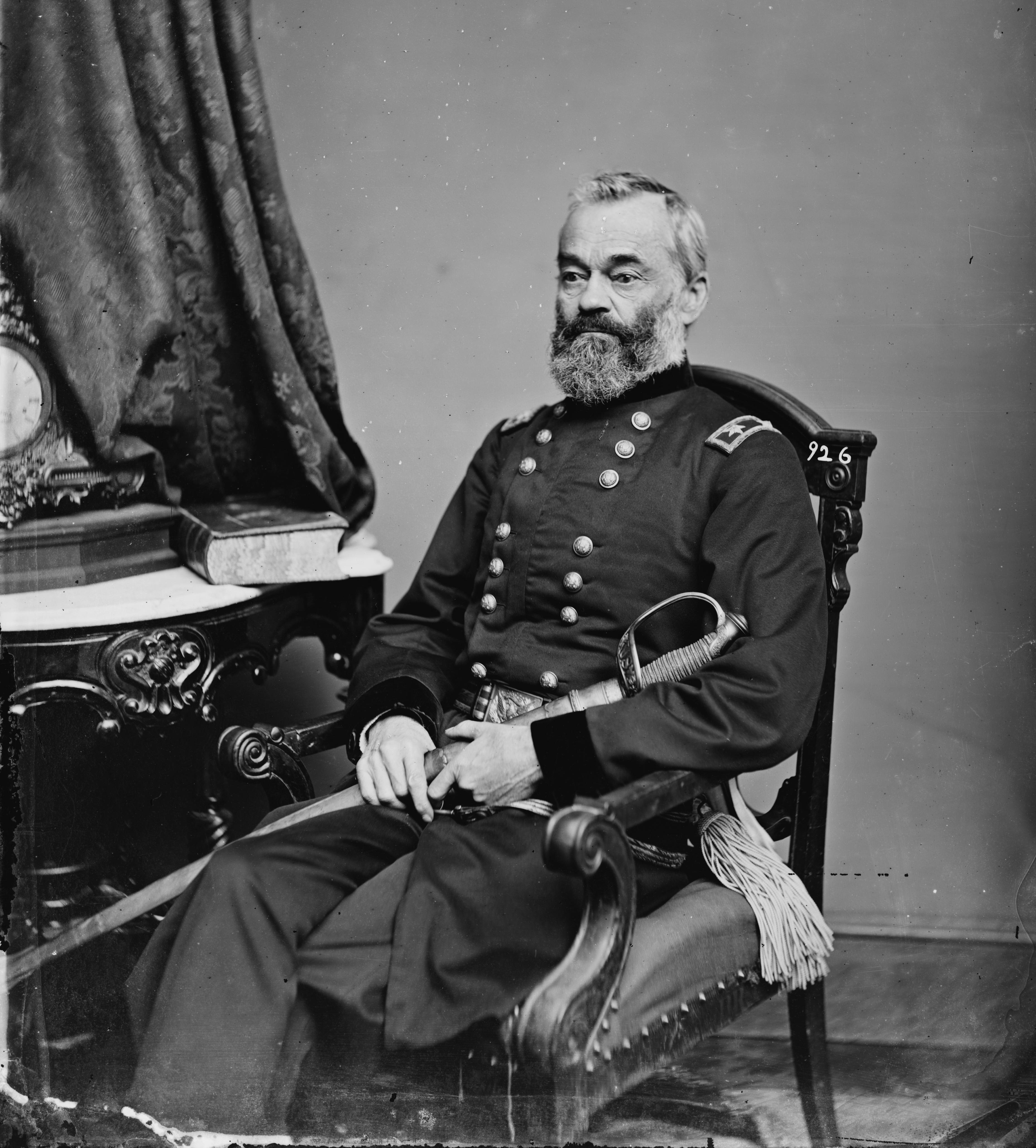
Maj. Gen.
Samuel P. Heintzelman (III Corps, Army of the Potomac), USA

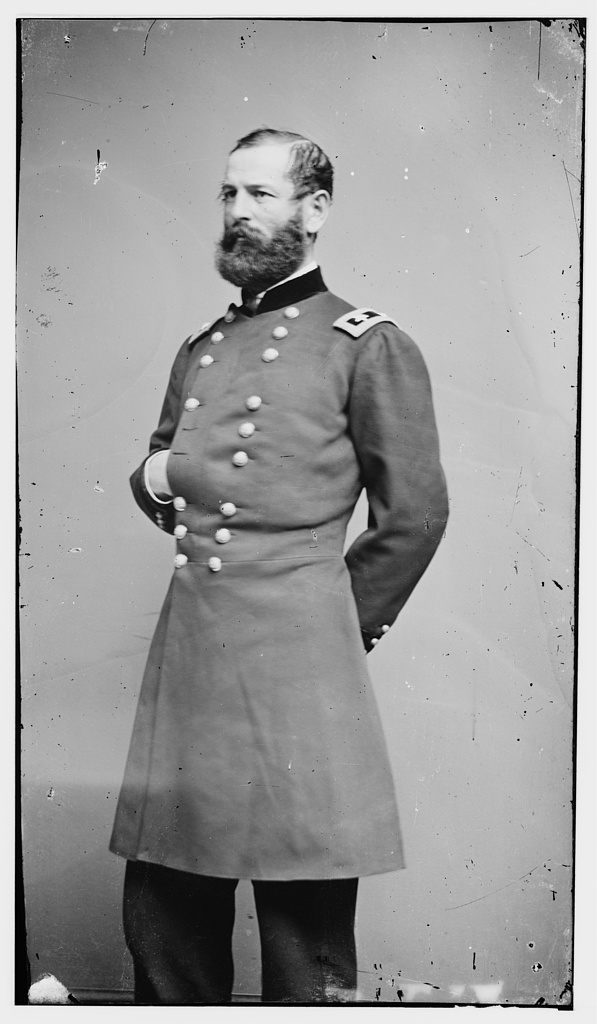
Maj. Gen.
Fitz John Porter (V Corps, Army of the Potomac, USA

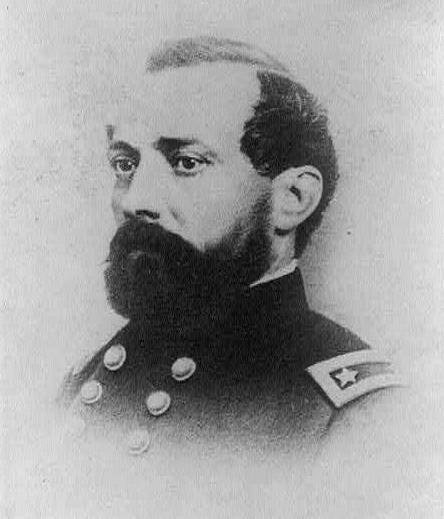
Maj. Gen.
Jesse L. Reno (IX Corps, Army of the Potomac), USA

Gen. Pope's Army of Virginia of approximately 43,500 men at the time of its constitution in June, was divided into three army corps:

The I Corps, under Maj. Gen. Franz Sigel consisted of the divisions of:

- Brig Gen. Robert C. Schenck (brigades of Brig Gen. Julius Stahel and Col. Nathaniel C. McLean).
- Brig Gen. Adolph von Steinwehr (brigade of Col. John A. Koltes).
- Brig Gen. Carl Schurz (brigades of Col. Alexander Schimmelfennig and Col. Wlodzimierz Krzyzanowski).
- Independent Brigades of Brig Gen. Robert H. Milroy, Col. John Beardsley, and Cpt. Louis Schirmer)

Maj. Gen. Nathaniel P. Banks' II Corps, which remained in place at Bristoe Station and did not participate in the battle.

The III Corps, Maj. Gen. Irvin McDowell, who had led the losing Union army at First Bull Run, consisted of the divisions of:

- Brig Gen. Rufus King (brigades of Brig Gen. John P. Hatch, Brig Gen. Abner Doubleday, Brig Gen. Marsena R. Patrick, and Brig Gen. John Gibbon)
- Brig Gen. James B. Ricketts (brigades of Brig Gen. Abram Duryée, Brig Gen. Zealous B. Tower, Col. John W. Stiles, and Col. Joseph Thoburn)
- Brig Gen. John F. Reynolds (Pennsylvania Reserves with Brig Gen. George Meade, Brig Gen. Truman Seymor, Brig Gen. Conrad F. Jackson and artillery under Captain Dunbar R. Ransom)

The Kanawha Division (detachment) and parts of three army corps of Gen. McClellan's Army of the Potomac, eventually joined Pope for combat operations, raising his strength to 77,000:

The III Corps, under Maj. Gen. Samuel P. Heintzelman, consisted of the divisions of:

- Maj. Gen. Philip Kearny (brigades of Brig Gen. John C. Robinson, Brig Gen. David B. Birney, Col. Orlando Poe)
- Maj. Gen. Joseph Hooker (brigades of Col. Cuvier Grover, Col. Nelson Taylor, and Col. Joseph B. Carr)

The V Corps under Maj. Gen. Fitz John Porter, consisted of the divisions of:

- Maj. Gen. George W. Morell (brigades of Col. Charles W. Roberts, Brig Gen. Charles Griffin and Brig Gen. Daniel Butterfield)
- Brig Gen. George Sykes (brigades of Lt. Col. Robert C. Buchanan, Lt. Col. William Chapman, Col. Gouverneur K. Warren, and Cpt. Stephen H. Weed)

A reserve corps under Brig. Gen. Samuel D. Sturgis with one brigade:

- Brig. Gen. Abram S. Piatt

The VI Corps under Maj. Gen. William B. Franklin

The IX Corps under Maj. Gen. Jesse L. Reno, consisted of the divisions of:

- Brig Gen. Isaac I. Stevens (brigades of Col. Benjamin C. Christ, Col. Daniel Leasure and Col. Addison Farnsworth)
- Maj. Gen. Jesse L. Reno (brigades of Col. James Nagle and Col. Edward Ferrero)

=== Confederate ===
Key commanders (Army of Northern Virginia)
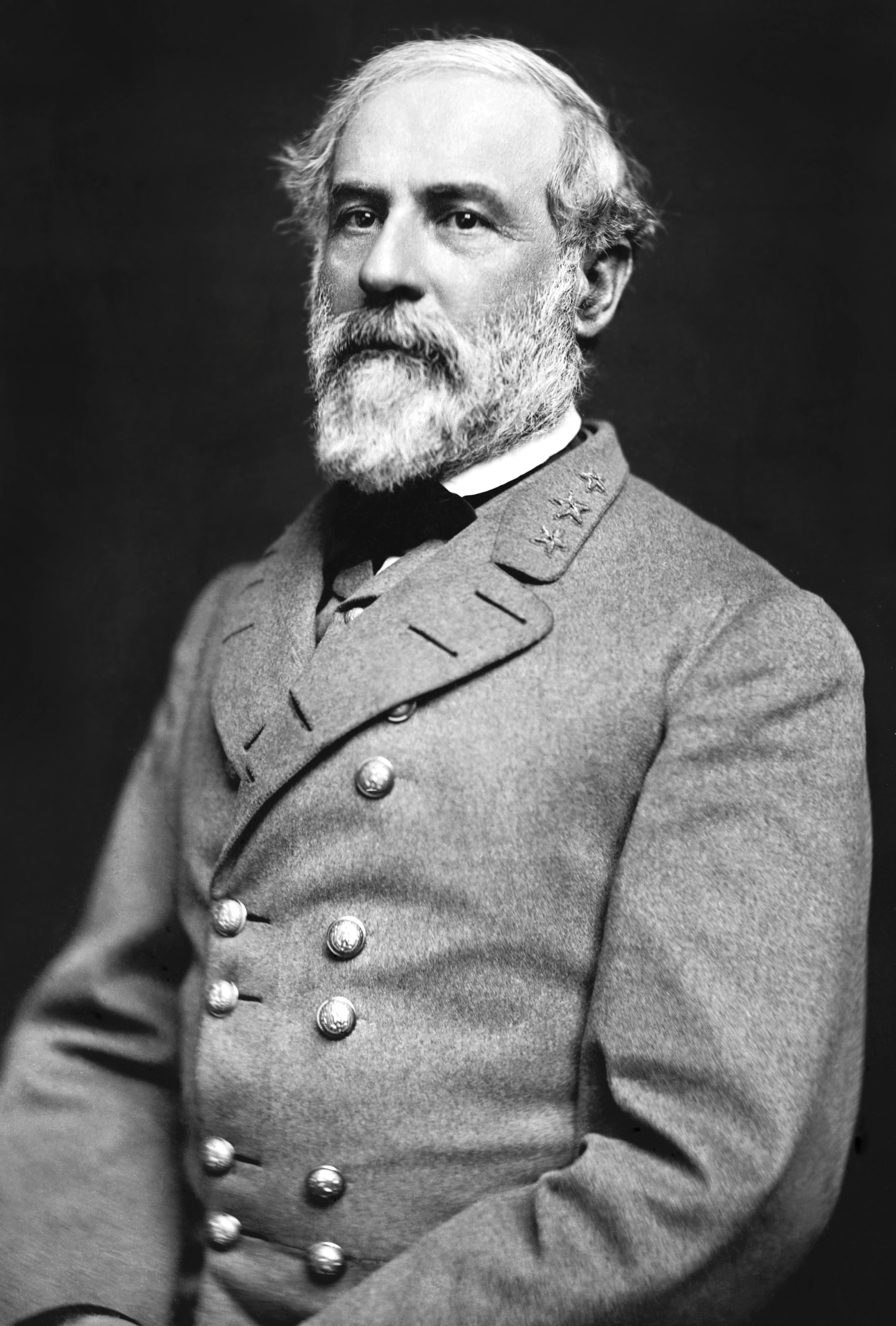
Gen.
Robert E. Lee, (Commanding), CSA

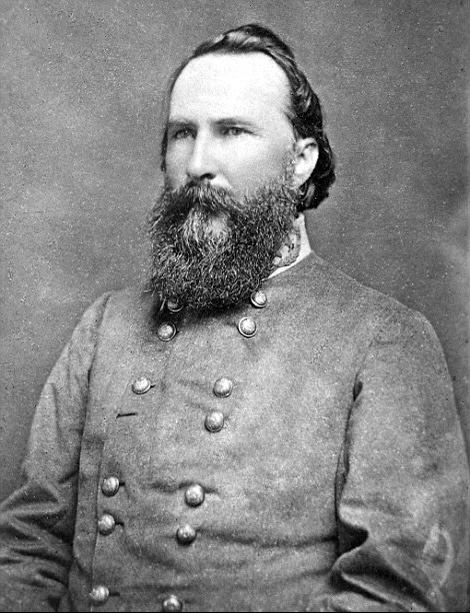
Maj. Gen.
James Longstreet, (Right Wing), CSA

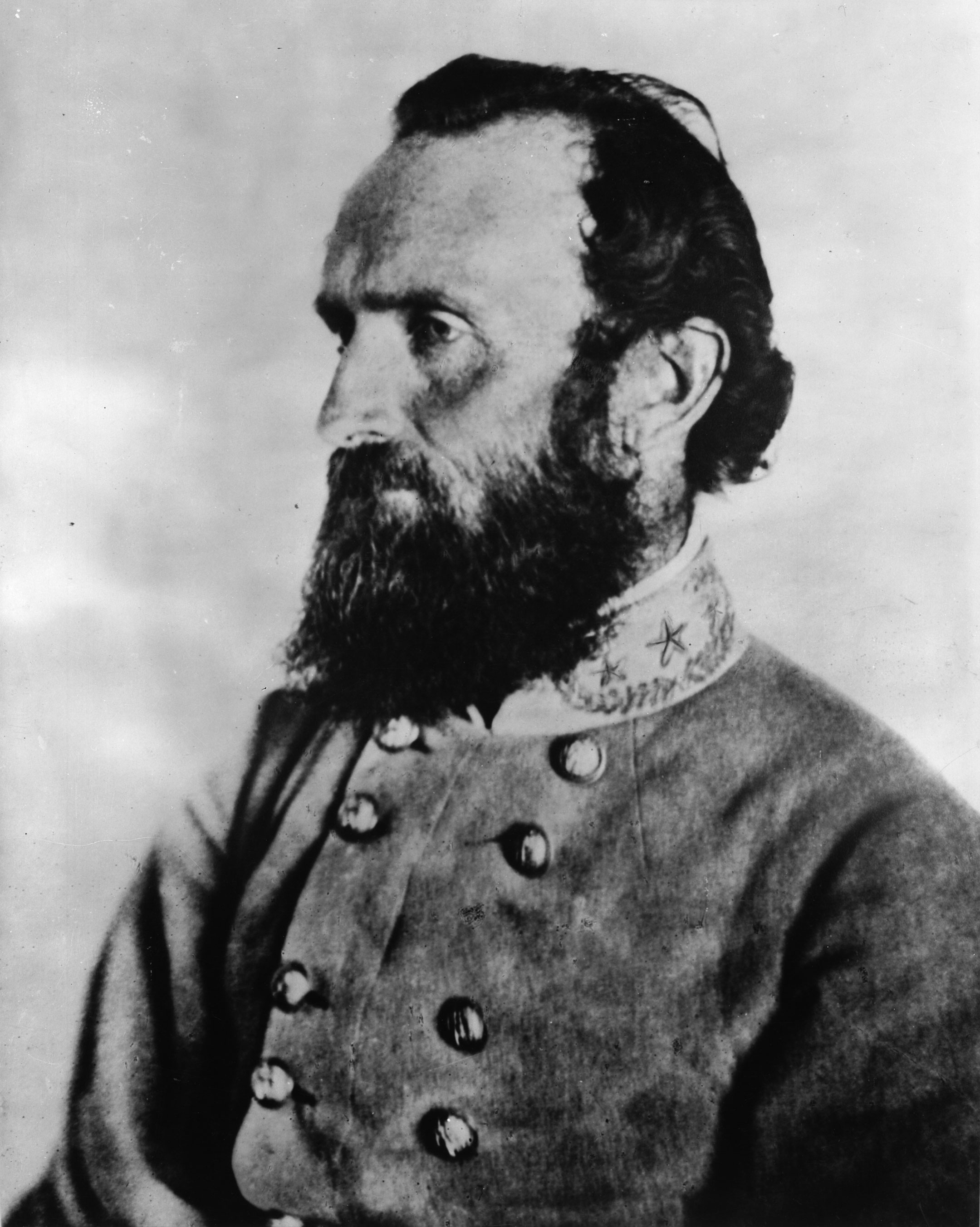
Maj. Gen.
Stonewall Jackson, (Left Wing), CSA

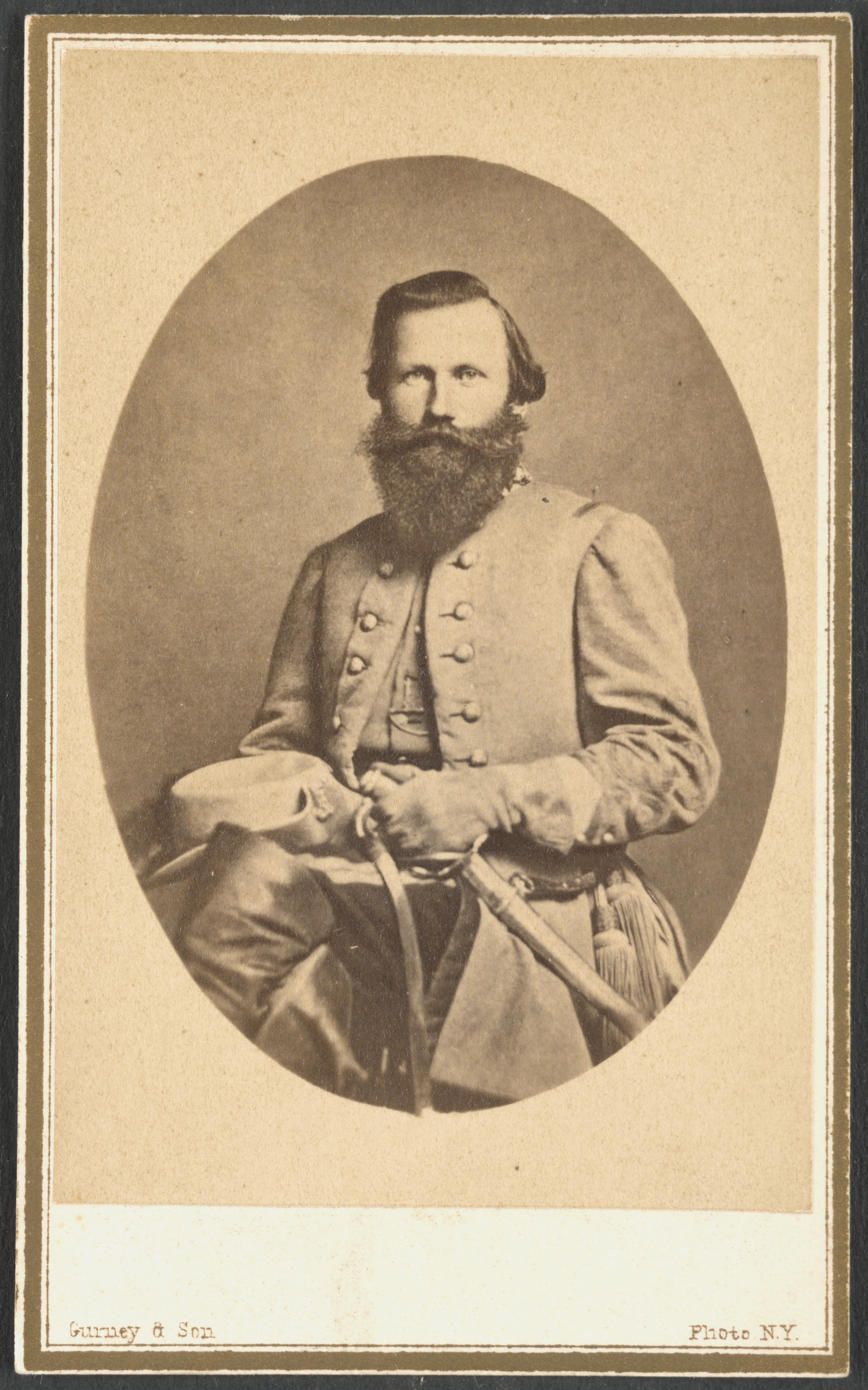
Maj. Gen.
J.E.B. Stuart, (Cavalry Division), CSA

On the Confederate side, Gen. Robert E. Lee's Army of Northern Virginia was organized into two "wings" or "commands" totaling about 55,000 men:

Maj. Gen. James Longstreet's Right Wing or Command consisted of the following divisions:

- Maj. Gen. Richard H. Anderson (brigades of Brig Gen. Lewis A. Armistead, Brig Gen. William Mahone and Brig Gen. Ambrose R. Wright)
- Brig Gen. David R. Jones (brigades of Col. Henry L. Benning, Brig Gen. Thomas F. Drayton, and Col. George T. Anderson)
- Brig Gen. Cadmus M. Wilcox (brigades of Brig Gen. Cadmus M. Wilcox, Brig Gen. Roger A. Pryor, and Brig Gen. Winfield S. Featherston)
- Brig Gen. John B. Hood (brigades of Brig Gen. John B. Hood, Col. Evander M. Law, Maj. Bushrod W. Frobel)
- Brig Gen. James L. Kemper (brigades of Col. Montgomery D. Corse, Brig Gen. Micah Jenkins, Col. Eppa Hunton)
- Reporting Directly (Brig Gen. Nathan G. Evans)
- Reserve Artillery of James B. Walton
- Col. Stephen D. Lee's artillery battalion

Maj. Gen. Stonewall Jackson's Left Wing or Command consisted of the following divisions:

- Brig Gen. William B. Taliaferro (brigades of Col. William S. Baylor, Col. Bradley T. Johnson, Col. Alexander G. Taliaferro, Brig Gen. William E. Starke and Maj. Lindsey M. Shumaker)
- Maj. Gen. A. P. Hill (brigades of Brig Gen. Lawrence O. Branch, Brig Gen. William D. Pender, Col. Edward L. Thomas, Brig Gen. Maxcy Gregg, Brig Gen. James J. Archer, Brig Gen. Charles W. Field and Lt. Col. R. Lindsay Walker)
- Maj. Gen. Richard S. Ewell (brigades of Brig Gen. Alexander R. Lawton, Brig Gen. Isaac R. Trimble, Brig Gen. Jubal A. Early and Col. Henry Forno)
- The Cavalry Division, under Maj. Gen. J.E.B. Stuart was attached to Jackson's wing.

An exact estimate of both armies' strength at the battle is not possible as different reports and returns provide differing figures. The total strength of the Army of Northern Virginia, cavalry and artillery included, was slightly less than 55,000 men. Factoring in only infantry, the effective Confederate strength was probably about 50,000 men, possibly as low as 47,000. Union strength was around 63,000 men if Banks's corps is excluded as it was not present at the battle aside from a few detachments. The total Union strength with Banks added in was approximately 70,000 men.

== Battle ==
=== August 28: Brawner's Farm (Groveton) ===
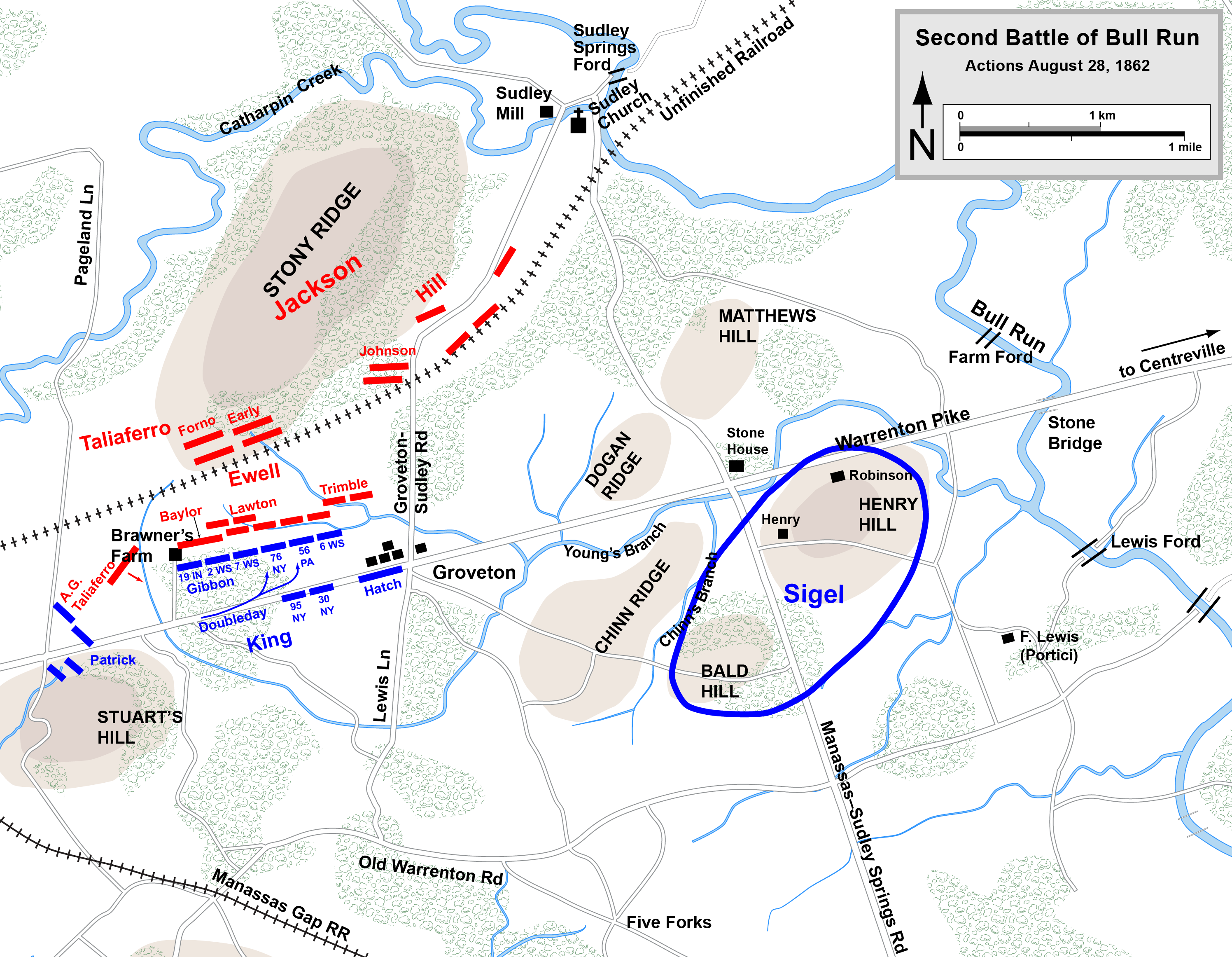
Action at Brawner's Farm, August 28

The Second Battle of Bull Run began on August 28 as a Federal column, under Jackson's observation just outside Gainesville, near the farm of the John Brawner family, moved along the Warrenton Turnpike. It consisted of units from Brig. Gen. Rufus King's division: the brigades of Brig. Gens. John P. Hatch, John Gibbon, Abner Doubleday, and Marsena R. Patrick, marching eastward to concentrate with the rest of Pope's army at Centreville. King was not with his division because he had suffered a serious epileptic attack earlier that day.

Jackson, who had been relieved to hear earlier that Longstreet's men were on their way to join him, displayed himself prominently to the Union troops, by riding up next to the marching Federals in his horse dressed as a farmer, to the horror of his aides, but his presence was disregarded, as the Federals had no interest in a seemingly harmless farmer. Concerned that Pope might be withdrawing his army behind Bull Run to link up with McClellan's arriving forces, Jackson determined to attack. Returning to his position behind the tree line, he told his subordinates, "Bring out your men, gentlemen." At about 6:30 p.m., Confederate artillery began shelling the portion of the column to their front, John Gibbon's Black Hat Brigade (later to be named the Iron Brigade). Gibbon, a former artilleryman, responded with fire from Battery B, 4th U.S. Artillery. The artillery exchange halted King's column. Hatch's brigade had proceeded past the area and Patrick's men, in the rear of the column, sought cover, leaving Gibbon and Doubleday to respond to Jackson's attack. Gibbon assumed that, since Jackson was supposedly at Centreville (according to Pope), and having just seen the 14th Brooklyn of Hatch's Brigade reconnoiter the position, that these were merely horse artillery cannons from Jeb Stuart's cavalry. Gibbon sent aides out to the other brigades with requests for reinforcements, and sent his staff officer Frank A. Haskell to bring the veteran 2nd Wisconsin Infantry up the hill to disperse the harassing cannons. Gibbon met the 2nd in the woods saying, "If we can get you up there quietly, we can capture those guns."

Our men on the left loaded and fired with the energy of madmen, and the 6th worked with equal desperation. This stopped the rush of the enemy and they halted and fired upon us their deadly musketry. During a few awful moments, I could see by the lurid light of the powder flashes, the whole of both lines. The two ... were within ... fifty yards of each other pouring musketry into each other as fast as men could load and shoot.

— Maj. Rufus R. Dawes, 6th Wisconsin

In a few moments our entire line was engaged in a fierce and sanguinary struggle with the enemy. As one line was repulsed another took its place and pressed forward as if determined by force of numbers and fury of assault to drive us from our positions.

— Maj. Gen. Stonewall Jackson

The 2nd Wisconsin, under the command of Col. Edgar O'Connor, advanced obliquely back through the woods the Federal column was passing through. When the 430 men emerged from the woods on John Brawner's farm they were quietly formed and advanced up the hill. Upon reaching the plateau, they deployed skirmishers who drove back Confederate skirmishers. They soon received a heavy volley into their right flank by 800 men of the fabled Stonewall Brigade, commanded by Col. William S. Baylor. Absorbing the volley from 150 yards (140 m), the 2nd Wisconsin did not waver, but replied with a devastating volley at the Virginians in Brawner's orchard. The Confederates returned fire when the lines were only 80 yards (73 m) apart. As units were added by both sides, the battle lines remained close together, a standup fight with little cover, trading mass volleys for over two hours. Jackson described the action as "fierce and sanguinary". Gibbon added his 19th Indiana. Jackson, personally directing the actions of his regiments instead of passing orders to the division commander, Maj. Gen. Richard S. Ewell, sent in three Georgia regiments belonging to Brig. Gen. Alexander R. Lawton's brigade. Gibbon countered this advance with the 7th Wisconsin. Jackson ordered Brig. Gen. Isaac R. Trimble's brigade to support Lawton, which met the last of Gibbon's regiments, the 6th Wisconsin.

After Trimble's brigade entered the action, Gibbon needed to fill a gap in his line between the 6th Wisconsin and the rest of the Iron Brigade regiments. Doubleday sent in the 56th Pennsylvania and the 76th New York, who advanced through the woods and checked the new Confederate advance. These men arrived at the scene after dark and both Trimble and Lawton launched uncoordinated assaults against them. Horse artillery under Captain John Pelham was ordered forward by Jackson and fired at the 19th Indiana from less than 100 yards (91 m). The engagement ended around 9 p.m., with Gibbon's men slowly retreating backwards still firing, making their line at the edge of the woods. Doubleday's regiments retired to the turnpike in an orderly fashion. The fight was essentially a stalemate, but at a heavy cost, with over 1,150 Union and 1,250 Confederate casualties. The 2nd Wisconsin lost 276 of 430 engaged. The Stonewall Brigade lost 340 out of 800. Two Georgia regiments—Trimble's 21st and Lawton's 26th—each lost more than 70%. In all, one of every three men engaged in the fight was shot. Confederate Brig. Gen. William B. Taliaferro wrote, "In this fight there was no maneuvering and very little tactics. It was a question of endurance and both endured." Taliaferro was wounded, as was Ewell, whose left leg was shattered by a Minié ball and had to be amputated, removing him from action for the next ten months.

Jackson had not been able to achieve a decisive victory with his superior force (about 6,200 men against Gibbon's 2,100), due to darkness, his piecemeal deployment of forces, the loss of two of his division commanders, and the tenacity of the enemy. But he had achieved his strategic intent, attracting the attention of John Pope. Pope wrongly assumed that the fight at the Brawner Farm occurred as Jackson was retreating from Centreville. Pope believed he had "bagged" Jackson and sought to capture him before he could be reinforced by Longstreet. Pope's dispatch sent that evening to Maj. Gen. Philip Kearny stated, in part, "General McDowell has intercepted the retreat of the enemy and is now in his front ... Unless he can escape by by-paths leading to the north to-night, he must be captured." Gibbon conferred with King, Patrick, and Doubleday as to the next move, because McDowell was "lost in the woods". The division was in an exposed position with two of its brigades badly cut up, and facing Stonewall Jackson's entire corps. Although the Union generals did not know exactly how many men Jackson had with him, it was almost certainly a far greater number than the 4000 men in King's division. Moreover, Confederate prisoners taken in the fighting around Brawner's Farm claimed that Jackson's command numbered between 60,000 and 70,000 men and was poised to strike at first light the next morning. Reynolds and Sigel were some miles away and would not be on the scene until morning, by which time Jackson could easily crush King. Ricketts was closer, but had Longstreet following far behind. Since staying in place at Groveton was clearly unacceptable, the only other options were retreating either to Manassas Junction or Centreville. Gibbon recommended the former since the exact disposition of the enemy was unknown and going to Centreville risked a disastrous march across his front. King finally agreed, and the division formed up into columns and moved south to Manassas Junction. At the same time, Ricketts had arrived at a similar conclusion and marched south and away from Jackson as well, in his case towards Bristoe Station.

Pope issued orders to his subordinates to surround Jackson and attack him in the morning, but Jackson was not where Pope thought he was, nor were Pope's own troops where he assumed. He believed that McDowell and Sigel were blocking Jackson's retreat west across the Bull Run Mountains when in fact King and Ricketts had both retreated southward, while Sigel and Reynolds were south and east of Jackson, who had no intention at all of retreating and was well dug-in and awaiting Longstreet's arrival, which Pope refused to believe was a possibility.

=== August 29: Jackson defends Stony Ridge ===
Jackson had initiated the battle at Brawner's farm with the intent of holding Pope until Longstreet arrived with the remainder of the Army of Northern Virginia. Longstreet's 25,000 men began their march from Thoroughfare Gap at 6 a.m. on August 29; Jackson sent Stuart to guide the initial elements of Longstreet's column into positions that Jackson had preselected. While he waited for their arrival, Jackson reorganized his defense in case Pope attacked him that morning, positioning 20,000 men in a 3,000-yard (2,700 m) line to the south of Stony Ridge. Noticing the buildup of I Corps (Sigel's) troops along the Manassas-Sudley Road, he ordered A.P. Hill's brigades behind the railroad grade near Sudley Church on his left flank. Aware that his position was geographically weak (because the heavy woods in the area prevented effective deployment of artillery), Hill placed his brigades in two lines, with Brig. Gen. Maxcy Gregg's South Carolina brigade and Brig. Gen. Edward L. Thomas's Georgia brigade in the front. In the center of the line, Jackson placed two brigades from Ewell's division (now under the command of Brig. Gen. Alexander Lawton), and on the right, William B. Taliaferro's division, now commanded by Brig. Gen. William E. Starke. Jackson's position straddled a railroad grade that had been dug out by the Manassas Gap Railroad Company in the 1850s and abandoned on the eve of the war. While some parts of the railroad grade were a good defensive position, others were not, moreover the heavily wooded terrain largely precluded the use of artillery aside from the right end of the line, which faced open fields. Fitz Lee's cavalry along with a battery of horse artillery were anchoring the left flank of the Confederate line, in case any Union troops attempted to cross Sudley Ford (as McDowell had done during the battle here 13 months earlier) and get in Jackson's rear. The Confederate right flank was potentially vulnerable, as it was held by Taliaferro's (now Starke's) division, the smallest of Jackson's three divisions and which had also taken significant casualties in the fighting at Brawner's Farm. Jackson thus placed the brigades of Early and Forno on the right end of the line, both large brigades that had not been engaged the previous evening and were fresh. Aside from bolstering Starke's understrength division, they were to watch and give notice of Longstreet's arrival.

At daybreak on the 29th, Pope had learned to his surprise and annoyance that Ricketts and King had both withdrawn south. In addition, John Gibbon arrived at Centreville and informed Pope that the retreat from Groveton was a mistake, ignoring the fact that he had recommended it in the first place. Gibbon also stated that he had no idea what had become of McDowell, to which an infuriated Pope replied "God damn McDowell! He's never where he's supposed to be!" Gibbon rode down to Manassas where he encountered Porter's troops resting and drawing rations. In addition, King, exhausted and ill from epileptic attacks, had turned over command of the division to John Hatch. McDowell was there as well, after spending most of the previous day wandering aimlessly around Prince William County, and not happy to learn of Pope's orders. In effect, King would accompany Porter, while Reynolds was temporarily attached to Sigel's corps, and Ricketts was still some miles away at Bristoe Station in effect leaving McDowell without any command. Pope on the 29th remained firmly wedded to the idea that Jackson was in a desperate situation and almost trapped, not only an incorrect assumption, but one that also depended on the coordination of all the corps and divisions under his command, none of which were where he intended them to be.

The result was that Pope's complicated attack plans for August 29 ended up as a simple frontal assault by Sigel's corps, the only troops in position that morning. I Corps was widely considered one of the army's weakest links, being largely composed of recent German immigrants who spoke little English: Sigel, though a trained and experienced military officer, was German-born and widely considered a political general promoted by Lincoln solely for his ability to recruit and motivate these German-speaking Unionists (many of whom had enlisted solely to fight under him). Having performed poorly in battles against Jackson in the Shenandoah Valley during the spring (and with scant respect or faith from their comrades-in-arms), I Corps' fighting morale was chronically low. Moreover, until Pope himself arrived, Sigel was the ranking officer on the field and would be in overall charge of the battle.

Pope's intention was to move against Jackson on both flanks. He ordered Fitz John Porter to move toward Gainesville and attack what he considered to be the Confederate right flank. He ordered Sigel to attack Jackson's left at daybreak. Sigel, unsure of Jackson's dispositions, chose to advance along a broad front, with Brig. Gen. Robert C. Schenck's division, supported by Brig. Gen. John F. Reynolds's division (McDowell's III Corps) on the left, Brig. Gen. Robert H. Milroy's independent brigade in the center, and Brig. Gen. Carl Schurz's division on the right. Schurz's two brigades, moving north on the Manassas-Sudley Road, were the first to contact Jackson's men, at about 7 a.m.

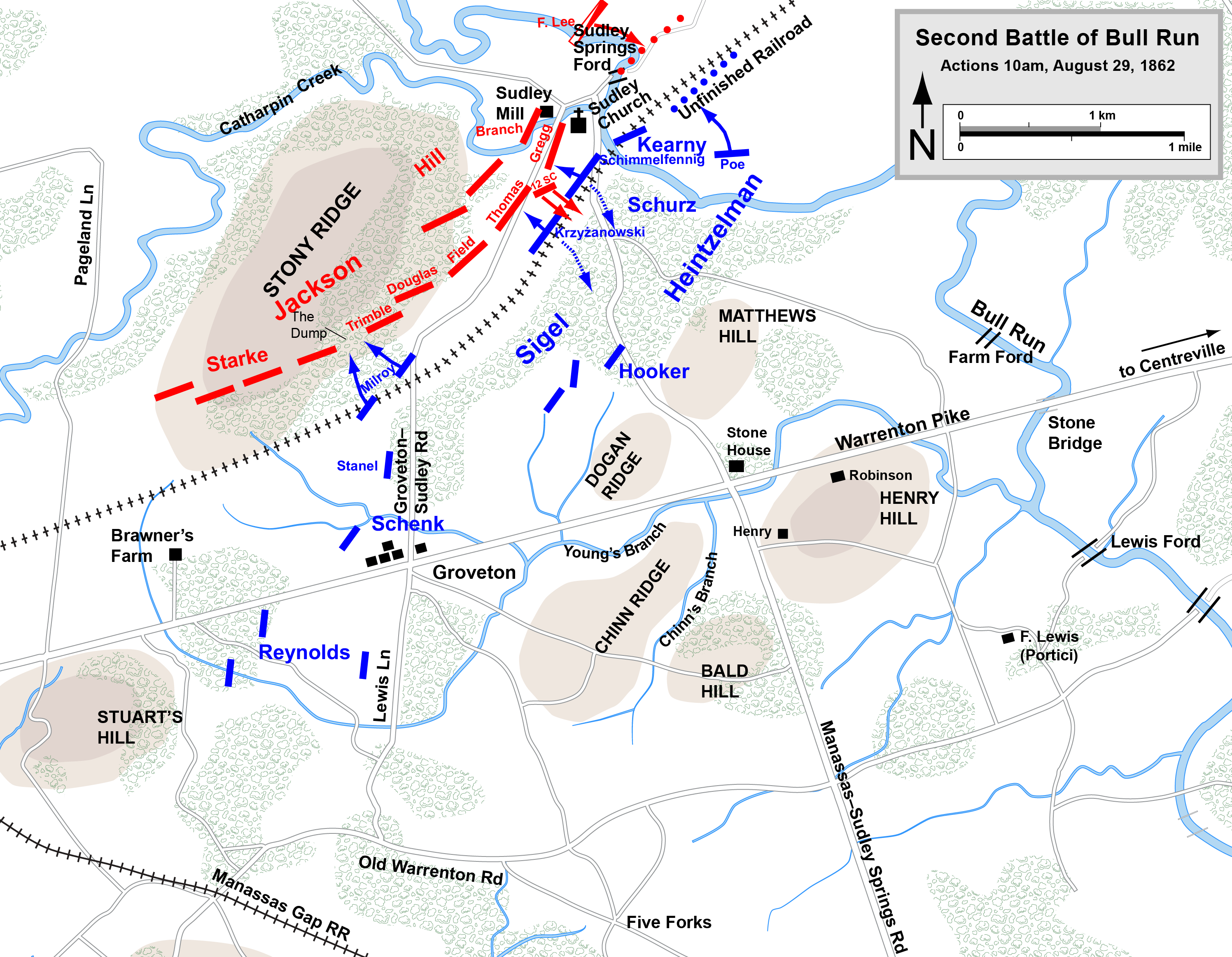
August 29, 10 a.m.: Sigel's attack

The actions in Sigel's attack against A.P. Hill's division were typical of all the attacks near Stony Ridge that day. Although the unfinished railroad provided natural defensive positions in some places, in general the Confederates maintained all but a static defense, absorbing the Union blows and following up with vigorous counterattacks. (These were the same tactics that Jackson would employ at the Battle of Antietam a few weeks later.) Schurz's two brigades (under Brig. Gen. Alexander Schimmelfennig and Col. Włodzimierz Krzyżanowski) skirmished heavily with Gregg and Thomas, with both sides committing their forces piecemeal. Hand-to-hand combat ensued in the woods to the west of Sudley Road as Krzyzanowski's brigade clashed with Gregg's. As Milroy heard the sound of battle to his right, he ordered his brigade forward, the 82nd Ohio and 5th West Virginia in front and the 2nd West Virginia and 4th West Virginia in the rear as support troops. The two forward regiments were immediately met with volleys of Confederate musket fire, in the confusion, the 82nd Ohio found an undefended ravine in the middle of the railroad embankment known as "The Dump" and got in the rear of Isaac Trimble's Confederate brigade. However, Trimble was quickly reinforced by part of Bradley Johnson's Virginia brigade and the 82nd Ohio was forced to retreat. Its commander, Col. James Cantwell, was shot dead and the regiment fled in panic, causing the 5th West Virginia behind them to also retreat in disorder. In just 20 minutes of fighting, Milroy's brigade had taken 300 casualties. Schenck and Reynolds, subjected to a heavy artillery barrage, answered with counterbattery fire, but avoided a general advance of their infantry, instead merely deploying skirmishers which got into a low-level firefight with Jubal Early's brigade. While this was going on, Meade's brigade came across wounded men from King's division, who had been abandoned by their comrades and left on the field all night. Medical personnel attempted to evacuate as many of the wounded as possible under the ongoing firefight. With his brigade in shreds, Milroy attempted to rally the survivors. He then came across Brig. Gen Julius Stahel, one of Schenck's brigadiers, and ordered him to defend against any Confederate counterattack coming from the woods. Although a hundred or so Confederates came bounding out of the woods in pursuit of Milroy, they were quickly driven back by artillery fire and Stahel returned to his original position south of the turnpike.

Assuming that Kearny's division of the III Corps was poised to support him, Schurz ordered another assault against Hill around 10 a.m., now that Schimmelfennig's brigade, plus the 1st New York from Kearny's division, had come up to reinforce Krzyzanowski. The fighting in the woods west of Sudley Road resumed and it came down to a standstill until the 14th Georgia came down to reinforce the South Carolinans. They let loose multiple volleys of musket fire that sent Krzyzanowski's men running in panic. The Confederates came charging after the disorganized mass of Union troops, clubbing, bayoneting, and knifing resisters, but as they exited the woods and came out onto open ground, Union artillery positioned on Dogan's Ridge opened fire on them and forced them to retreat. To the north, Schimmelfennig's three regiments, the 61st Ohio, 74th Pennsylvania, and 8th West Virginia, engaged part of Gregg and Branch's brigades, but were forced to retreat. Kearny however did not move forward. His three brigades instead marched to the banks of Bull Run Creek, where Orlando Poe's brigade forded the creek. The arrival of Poe's brigade aroused panic at Jackson's headquarters, as the dreaded scenario of Union troops getting in the Confederate rear seemed to be turning to reality. Jackson ordered his wagons evacuated from the area and Maj. John Pelham's horse artillery wheeled into position. The horse artillery and several companies of the 1st Virginia Cavalry engaged in a firefight with Poe's brigade for several minutes. Nobody on the Union side realized that they were getting in the rear of the Confederate line, and the sight of gray infantry in the distance was enough to discourage Poe from advancing any further, so he pulled back across the creek. Robinson's brigade remained in position along the banks of the creek while Birney's seven regiments scattered. One was directed to support the corps artillery on Matthews Hill, another held idly in reserve, and the remaining three accompanied Poe to the banks of the creek until Confederate artillery fire became too hot for them and they pulled south into the woods where they joined in skirmishing with A.P. Hill's troops.

Sigel for his part was satisfied with the progress of the battle so far, assuming he was merely supposed to perform a holding action until Pope arrived. By 1 p.m., his sector was reinforced by the division of Maj. Gen. Joseph Hooker (III Corps) and the brigade of Brig. Gen. Isaac Stevens (IX Corps). Pope also arrived on the battlefield, where Sigel graciously ceded command to him. He expected to see the culmination of his victory, but instead, he found that Sigel's attack had failed completely with Schurz and Milroy's troops shot up, disorganized, and incapable of further action. Reynolds and Schenck's divisions were fresh, but they were committed to guarding the army's left flank. However, Heintzelman's corps and the two divisions of Reno were also available, giving a total of eight fresh brigades, but Pope also assumed that McDowell would be on the field and that McClellan would come down from Washington, D.C., with the II and VI Corps. Instead, there was no sign of any of these troops anywhere. Pope momentarily considered withdrawing to Centreville, but became worried of the political fallout that would result if he was seen as insufficiently aggressive. Around this time, a messenger arrived and delivered Pope a note announcing that McDowell's corps was close up and would soon be on the field. Pope thus decided that he would drive at Jackson's center. By this time, Longstreet's initial units were in position to Jackson's right. Brig. Gen. John Bell Hood's division straddled the turnpike, loosely connected with Jackson's right flank. To Hood's right were the divisions of Brig. Gens. James L. Kemper and David R. "Neighbor" Jones. Brig. Gen. Cadmus M. Wilcox's division arrived last and was placed into reserve.

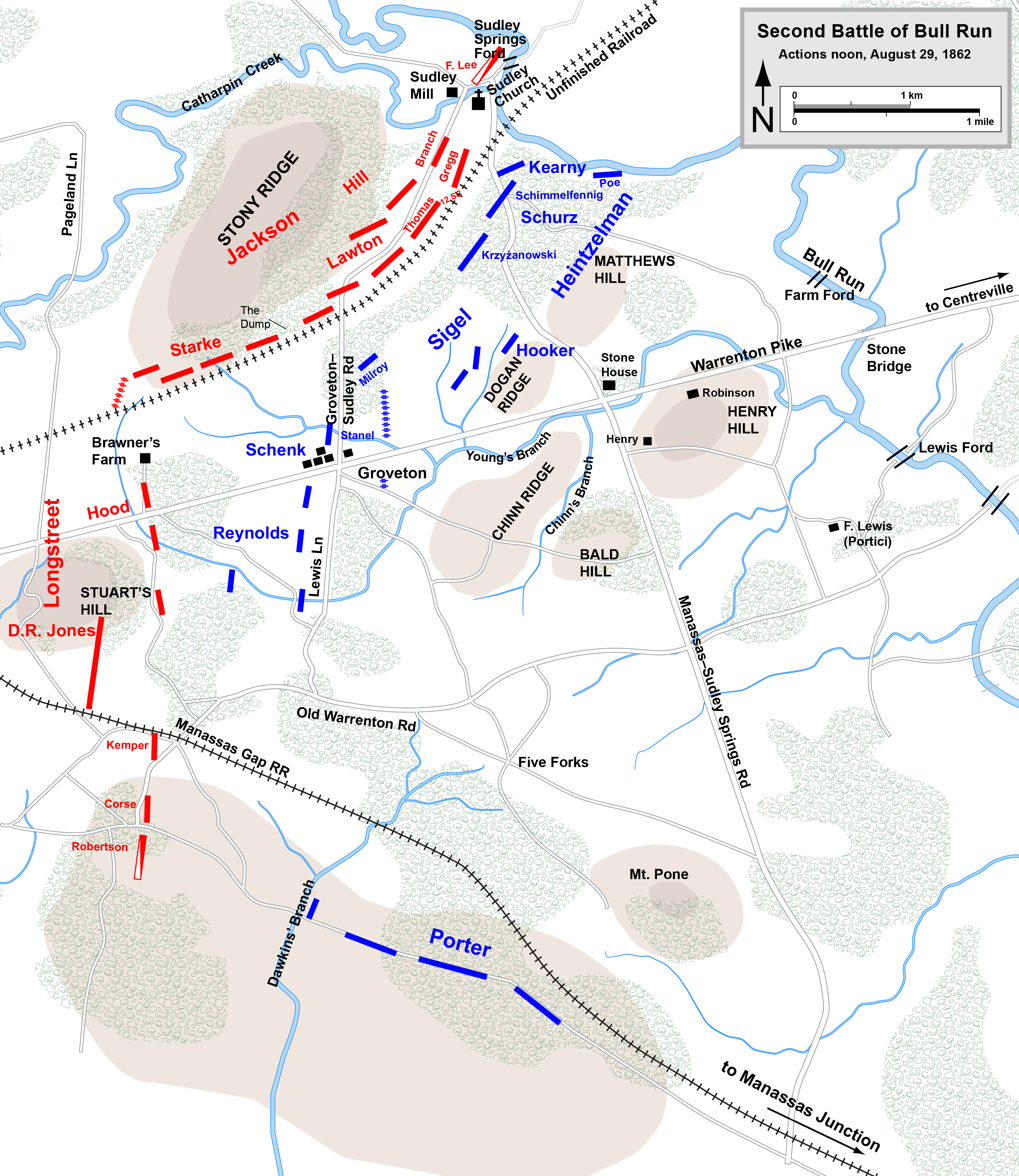
August 29, 12 noon: Longstreet arrives, Porter stalls

Stuart's cavalry encountered Porter, Hatch, and McDowell moving up the Manassas-Gainesville Road and a brief but sharp firefight halted the Union column. Then a courier arrived with a message for Porter and McDowell, a controversial document from Pope that has become known as the "Joint Order". Historian John J. Hennessy described the order as a "masterpiece of contradiction and obfuscation that would become the focal point of decades of wrangling". It described the attacks on Jackson's left, which were already underway, but was unclear about what Porter and McDowell were supposed to do. Rather than moving "to" Gainesville and striking Jackson's supposedly unprotected right flank, it described a move "toward" Gainesville and "as soon as communication is established [with the other divisions] the whole command shall halt. It may be necessary to fall back behind Bull Run to Centreville tonight." Nowhere in the order did Pope explicitly direct Porter and McDowell to attack and he concluded the order with, "If any considerable advantages are to be gained from departing from this order it will not be strictly carried out," rendering the document virtually useless as a military order.

Meanwhile, Stuart's cavalry under Col. Thomas Rosser deceived the Union generals by dragging tree branches behind a regiment of horses to simulate great clouds of dust from large columns of marching soldiers. At this time, McDowell received a report from his cavalry commander, Brig. Gen. John Buford, who reported that 17 regiments of infantry, one battery, and 500 cavalry were moving through Gainesville at 8:15 a.m. This was Longstreet's wing arriving from Thoroughfare Gap, and it warned the two Union generals that trouble lay to their front. The Union advance was again halted. For some reason, McDowell neglected to forward Buford's report to Pope until about 7 p.m., so the army commander was operating under two severe misconceptions: that Longstreet was not near the battlefield and that Porter and McDowell were marching to attack Jackson's right flank.

As Longstreet's men were placed into their final positions, General Lee ordered an offensive against the Union left. (Longstreet later remembered that Lee "was inclined to engage as soon as practicable, but did not order".) Longstreet, however, saw that the divisions of Reynolds and Schenck extended south of the Warrenton Turnpike, overlapping half of his line, and he argued against making the attack at that time. Lee eventually relented when Jeb Stuart reported that the force on the Gainesville–Manassas Road (Porter and McDowell) was formidable.

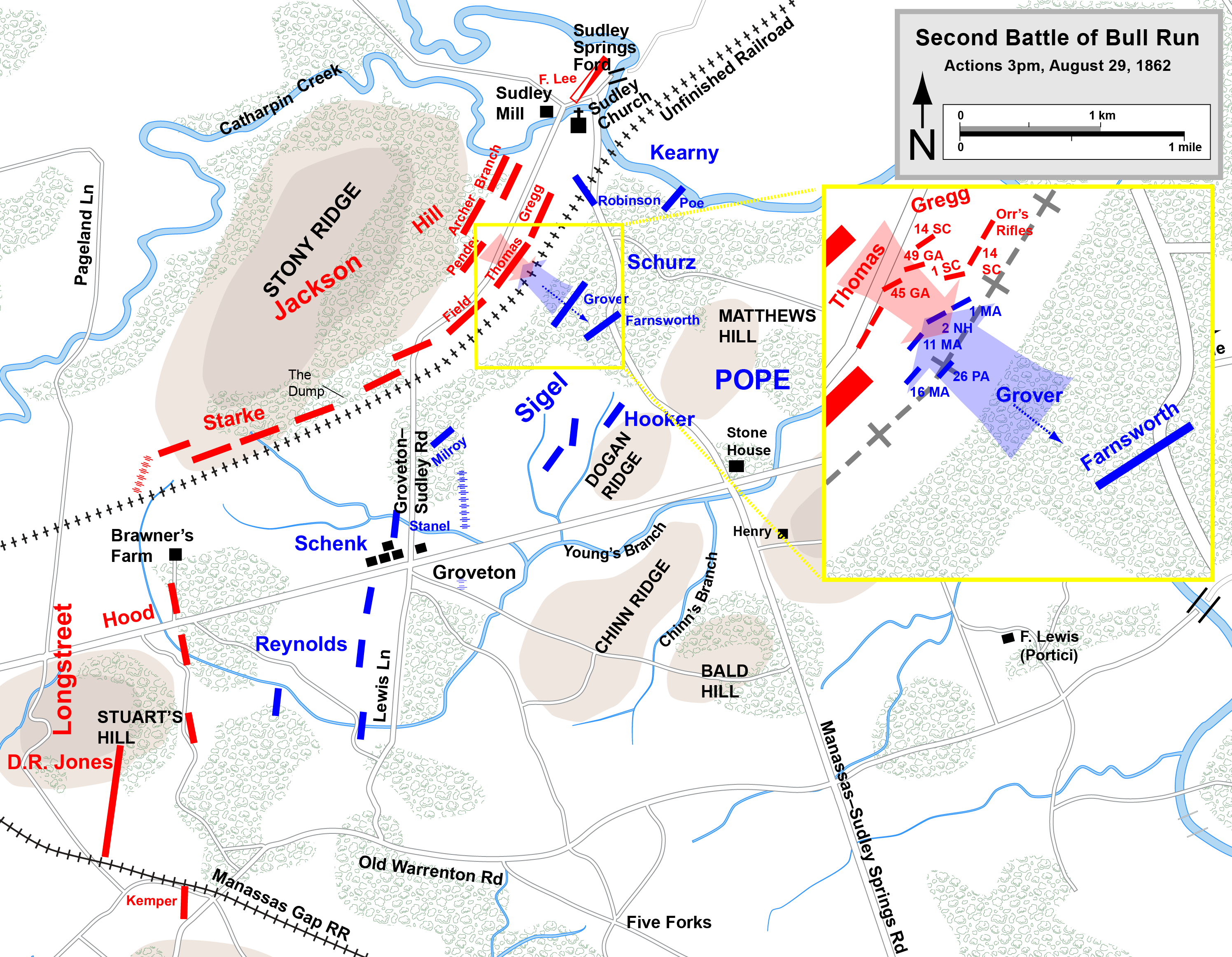
August 29, 3 p.m.: Grover's attack

Pope, assuming that the attack on Jackson's right would proceed as he thought he had ordered, authorized four separate attacks against Jackson's front with the intent of diverging the Confederates' attention until Porter delivered the fatal blow. Brig. Gen. Cuvier Grover's brigade attacked at 3 p.m., expecting to be supported by Kearny's division. With Isaac Stevens's division behind him as support, Grover moved his brigade into the woods and charged right at Edward Thomas's Georgia brigade. Grover's men got all the way to the railroad embankment and unleashed a volley of near point-blank fire on Thomas's regiments, followed by a bayonet charge. Taken by surprise, the Georgians fell back and fierce hand-to-hand combat ensued. Maxcy Gregg's South Carolinans came to reinforce them, followed by Dorsey Pender's brigade of North Carolinans. Pender hit Grover's brigade in the flank and sent the men fleeing in panic with over 350 casualties. Pender's brigade then surged out of the woods in pursuit of Grover, but once again the Union artillery on Dogan Ridge was too powerful; a strong barrage forced Pender to retreat. Meanwhile, to the north, Joseph Carr's brigade had been engaged in a low-level firefight with Confederate troops, in the process wounding Isaac Trimble, one of Jackson's most dependable brigadiers since the Valley campaign the previous spring. With Nelson Taylor's brigade of Hooker's division in support, James Nagle's brigade of Reno's division surged forward and slammed into Trimble's brigade, temporarily leaderless. Trimble's men were routed and began to retreat in disorder, but like all the previous Union attacks during the day, Nagle was unsupported and had no chance against overwhelming enemy numbers. Henry Forno's Louisiana brigade counterattacked and drove Nagle back. Bradley Johnson and Col. Leroy Stafford's 9th Louisiana joined in the assault. To the south, John Hood's division had just arrived on the field, forcing back Milroy and Nagle. Milroy's already exhausted brigade fell apart and started to run from the onslaught. To check the Confederate counterattack, Pope pulled Schenck from south of the turnpike and with artillery support, forced the Confederates back to the shelter of the railroad embankment. While all this was going on, Kearny still remained out of the action.

Reynolds was ordered to conduct a spoiling attack south of the turnpike and encountered Longstreet's men, causing him to call off his demonstration. Pope dismissed Reynolds's concern as a case of mistaken identity, insisting that Reynolds had run into Porter's V Corps, preparing to attack Jackson's flank. Jesse Reno ordered a IX Corps brigade under Col. James Nagle to attack the center of Jackson's line again. This time Brig. Gen. Isaac R. Trimble's brigade was driven back from the railroad embankment, but Confederate counterattacks restored the line and pursued Nagle's troops back into the open fields until Union artillery halted their advance.

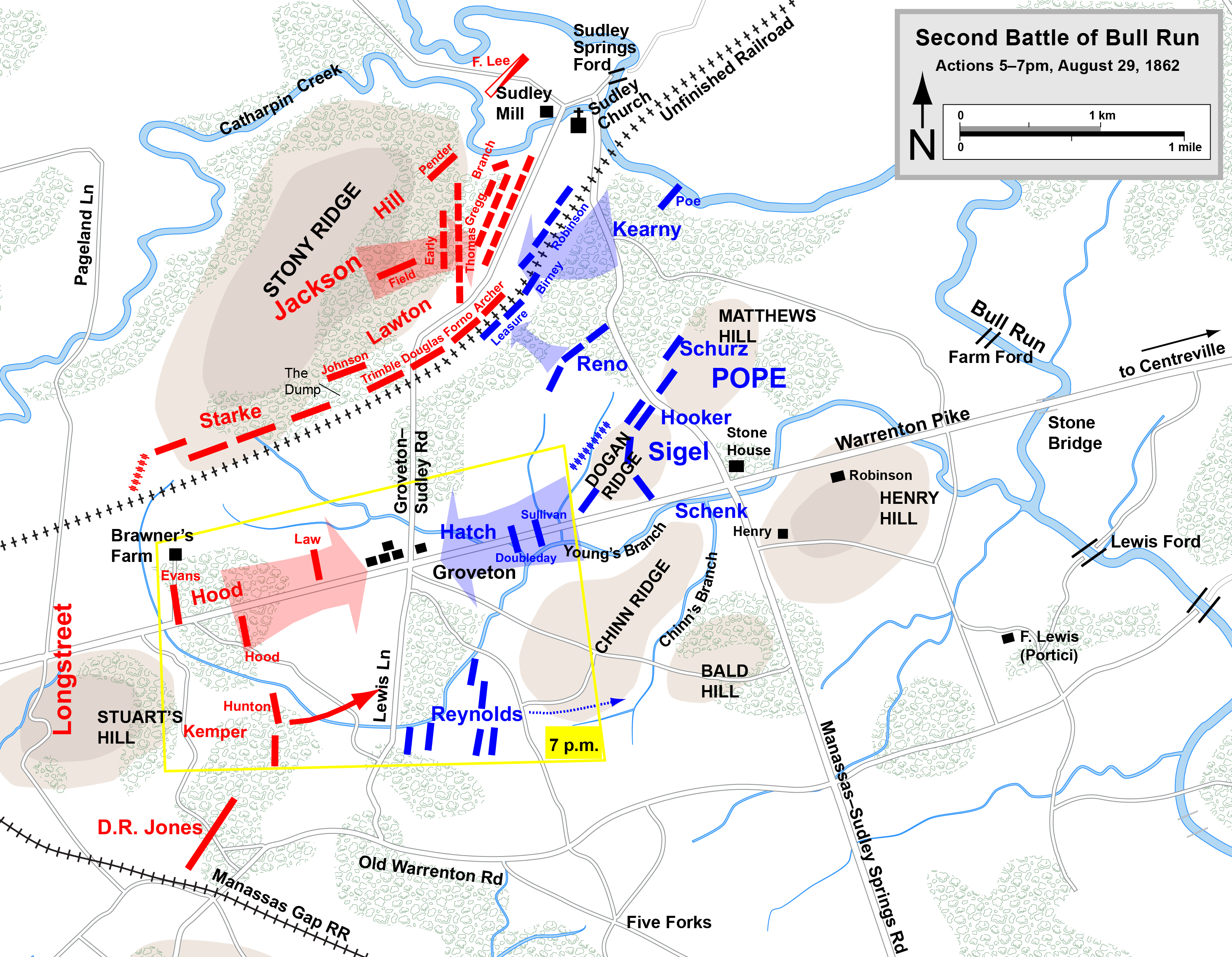
August 29, 5–7 p.m., Kearny's attack, Hood vs. Hatch

At 4:30 p.m., Pope finally sent an explicit order to Porter to attack, but his aide (his nephew) lost his way and did not deliver the message until 6:30 p.m. In any event, Porter was in no better position to attack then than he had been earlier in the day. However, in anticipation of the attack that would not come, Pope ordered Kearny to attack Jackson's far left flank, intending to put strong pressure on both ends of the line. At 5 p.m. Kearny sent Robinson and Birney's brigades surging forward into A.P. Hill's exhausted division. The brunt of the attack fell on Maxcy Gregg's brigade, which had defended against two major assaults over eight hours that day and was nearly out of ammunition in addition to having lost most of its officers. As they fell back onto the edge of a hillside, Gregg lopped some wildflowers with his old Revolutionary War scimitar and remarked, "Let us die here my men, let us die here." With both Thomas's and Gregg's brigades on the verge of disintegrating, A.P. Hill sent a message to Jackson calling for help. Meanwhile, Daniel Leasure's brigade of Isaac Stevens's division crept around to the south and forced back James Archer's Tennessee brigade. Jubal Early's brigade, which had begun the day on the extreme right of the Confederate line, and Lawrence O'Bryan Branch's brigade, which had thus far been held in reserve, counterattacked and drove back Kearny's division. During the fighting, one of Hill's brigadiers, Charles W. Field, was severely wounded and command of his brigade, which had also taken a beating over the course of the day, fell to Col. John M. Brockenbrough of the 40th Virginia.

On the Confederate right, Longstreet observed a movement of McDowell's force away from his front; the I Corps was moving divisions to Henry House Hill to support Reynolds. This report caused Lee to revive his plan for an offensive in that sector. Longstreet once again argued against it, this time due to inadequate time before dusk. Longstreet suggested "that the day being far spent it might be well to advance before night on a forced reconnaissance, get our troops in the most favourable positions, and have all things ready for battle the next morning." To this General Lee reluctantly gave consent and Hood's division was sent forward. As soon as McDowell arrived at Pope's headquarters, the latter urged him to move King's division forward. McDowell then informed Pope that King had fallen ill and relinquished command of the division to Brig. Gen John P. Hatch, whom Pope had taken a considerable disliking to early in the campaign. Hatch had originally led a cavalry brigade and failed to carry out an order from Pope to raid down into the Richmond outskirts. Displeased at this, Pope reassigned Hatch to infantry command. He now ordered Hatch to go up the Sudley Road and attack, but Hatch protested that the road was clogged with Kearny's troops, it would not be possible to clear them out of the way before darkness. Exasperated, Pope repeated his order for Hatch to advance on the Confederate right, but was soon distracted by actions going on the other side of the line. John Hood's division had arrived on Jackson's right and McDowell ordered Hatch to reinforce Reynolds despite Hatch's protests that two of his three brigades (Gibbon and Doubleday's) were exhausted from the fight at Brawner's Farm the previous day. Hatch deployed Doubleday's brigade out in front. Hood's division forced Hatch and Reynolds back to a position on Bald Hill, overrunning Chinn Ridge in the process. As night fell, Hood pulled back from this exposed position. Longstreet and his subordinates again argued to Lee that they should not be attacking a force they considered to be placed in a strong defensive position, and for the third time, Lee cancelled the planned assault.

Hood's withdrawal from Chinn Ridge only reinforced Pope's belief that the enemy was retreating. When Pope learned from McDowell about Buford's report, he finally acknowledged that Longstreet was on the field, but he optimistically assumed that Longstreet was there only to reinforce Jackson while the entire Confederate army withdrew; Hood's division had in fact just done that. Pope issued explicit orders for Porter's corps to rejoin the main body of the army and planned for another offensive on August 30. Historian A. Wilson Greene argues that this was Pope's worst decision of the battle. Since he no longer had numerical superiority over the Confederates and did not possess any geographical advantage, the most prudent course would have been to withdraw his army over Bull Run and unite with McClellan's Army of the Potomac, which had 25,000 men nearby.

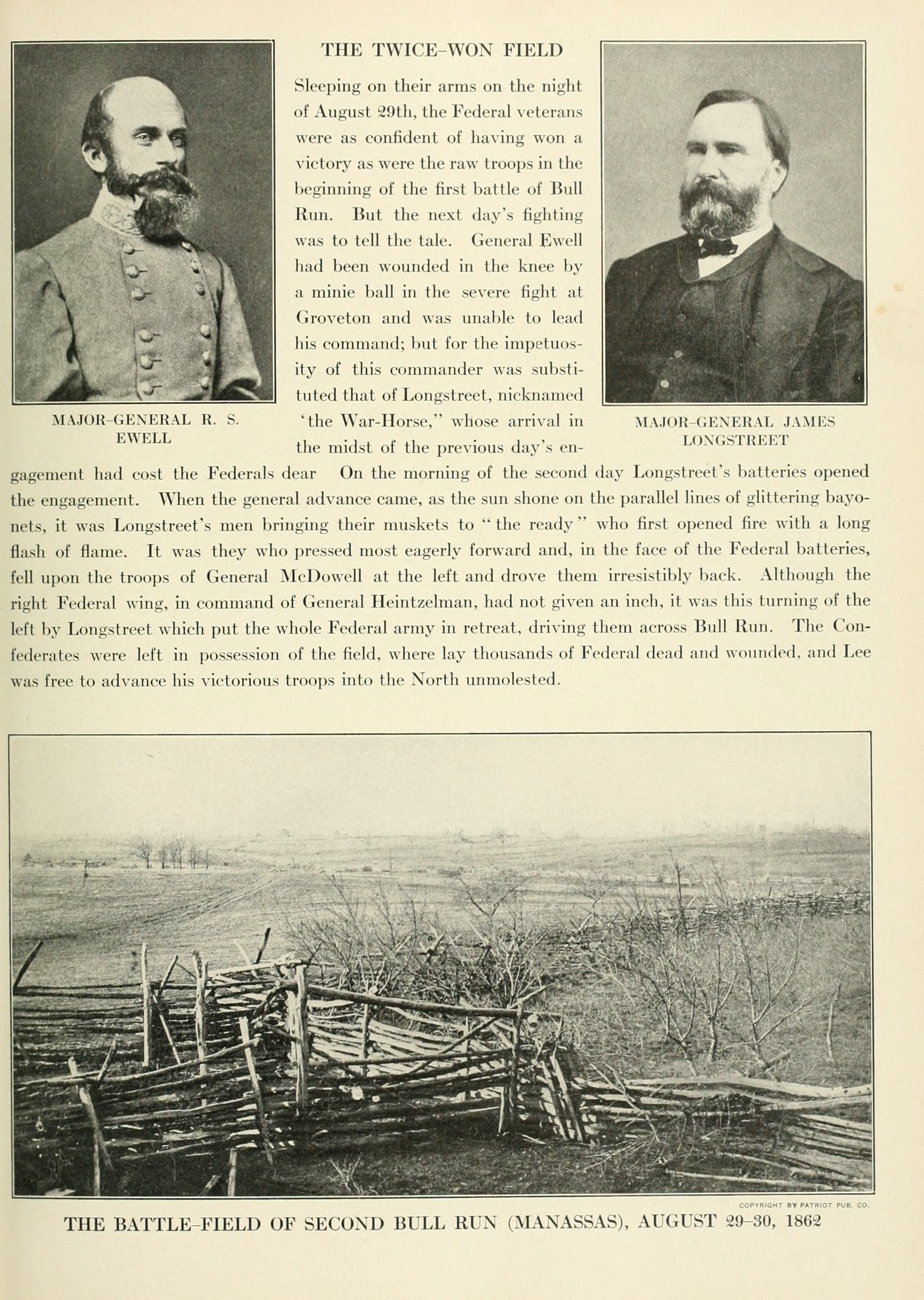
View of the battlefield on August 29–30

That evening, Pope wired Halleck with a report of the day's fighting, describing it as "severe" and estimating his losses at 7000–8000 men. He estimated Confederate losses at twice this many, an extremely incorrect estimation given that Jackson had been fighting a mostly defensive battle. Although Confederate casualties were lower, their officer losses had been high; aside from the loss of two division commanders on August 28, three brigade commanders, Trimble, Field, and Col. Henry Forno, had been wounded. For comparison, only one Union brigade commander had been wounded so far, Col. Daniel Leasure, and no general officers.

One of the historical controversies of the battle involves George B. McClellan's cooperation with John Pope. In late August, two full corps of the Army of the Potomac (William B. Franklin's VI Corps and Edwin V. Sumner's II Corps) had arrived in Alexandria, but McClellan would not allow them to advance to Manassas because of what he considered inadequate artillery, cavalry, and transportation support. He was accused by his political opponents of deliberately undermining Pope's position, and he did not help his case in history when he wrote to his wife on August 10, "Pope will be badly thrashed within two days & ... they will be very glad to turn over the redemption of their affairs to me. I won't undertake it unless I have full & entire control." He told Abraham Lincoln on August 29 that it might be wise "to leave Pope to get out of his scrape, and at once use all our means to make the capital perfectly safe".

=== August 30: Longstreet counterattack, Union retreat ===
The final element of Longstreet's command, the division of Maj. Gen. Richard H. Anderson, marched 17 miles (27 km) and arrived on the battlefield at 3 a.m., August 30. Exhausted and unfamiliar with the area, they halted on a ridge east of Groveton. At dawn, they realized they were in an isolated position too close to the enemy and fell back. Pope's belief that the Confederate army was in retreat was reinforced by this movement, which came after the withdrawal of Hood's troops the night before.

Pope thus directed McDowell to move his entire corps up the Sudley Road and hit the Confederate right flank. McDowell however protested this order, stating that he had no idea what was happening down on the Confederate left and he would much prefer to have his troops on Chinn Ridge. He then said that it would make more sense to attack the Confederate right with Heintzelman's troops, since they were closer to this area. Pope gave in, but decided to detach King's division to support Heintzelman.

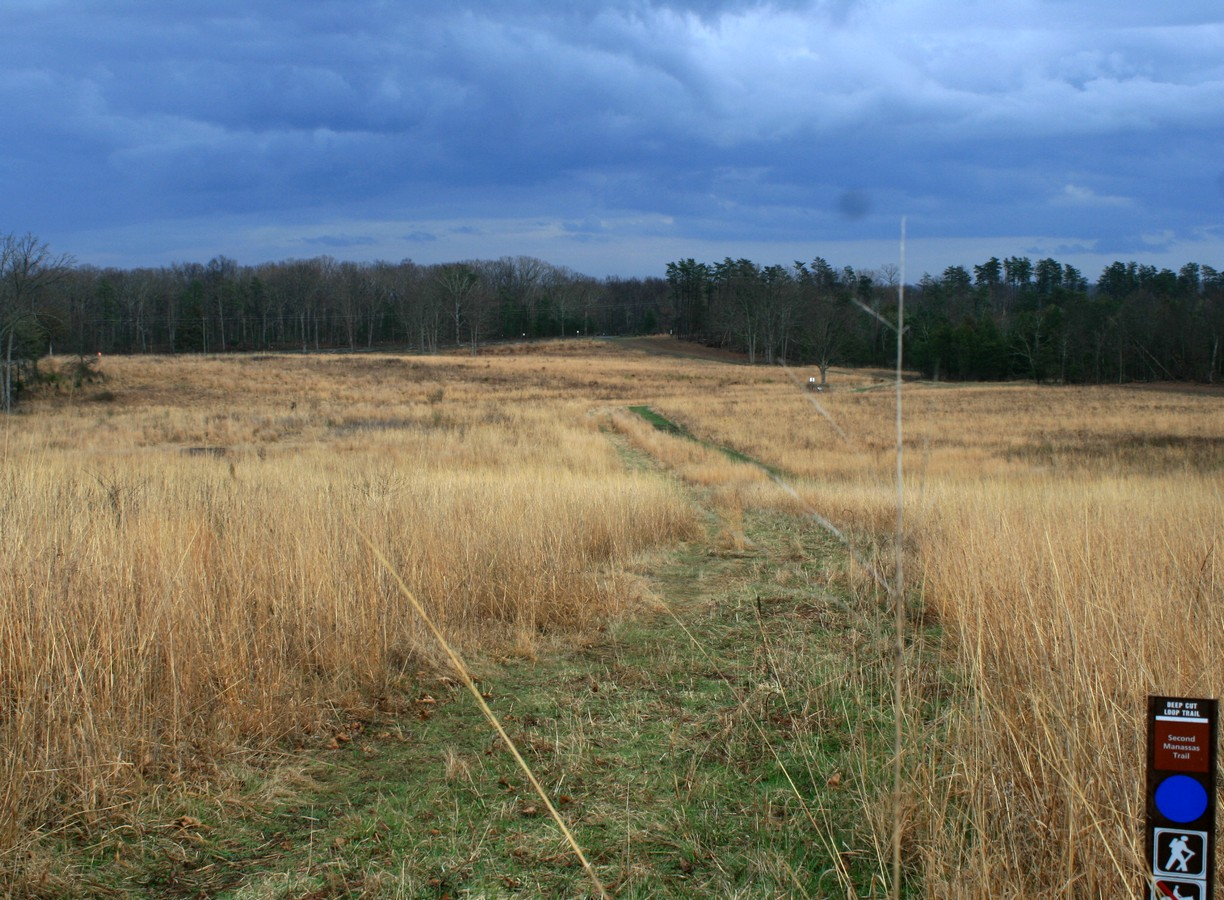
View of the field of Porter's assault on August 30, from the Confederate position

At an 8 a.m. council of war at Pope's headquarters, his subordinates attempted to convince their commander to move cautiously. Probes of the Confederate line on Stony Ridge around 10 a.m. indicated that Stonewall Jackson's men were still firmly in their defensive positions. John F. Reynolds indicated that the Confederates were in great strength south of the turnpike. Fitz John Porter arrived later with similar intelligence. However, Heintzelman and McDowell conducted a personal reconnaissance that somehow failed to find Jackson's defensive line, and Pope finally made up his mind to attack the retreating Southerners.

While Porter was bringing his corps up, a further mix-up in orders resulted in the loss of two brigades. Abram Sanders Piatt's small brigade, which had been detached from the defenses of Washington, D.C., and temporarily attached to the V Corps, and Charles Griffin's brigade both pulled out of Porter's main column, marched back down to Manassas Junction, and then up to Centreville. Morell, using an outdated set of orders from a day earlier, had assumed Pope was at Centreville and he was expected to join him there. Piatt eventually realized that something was amiss and turned back around towards the battlefield, arriving on Henry House Hill at about 4 p.m. Griffin and his division commander Maj. Gen George W. Morell, however, stayed at Centreville despite their discovery that Pope was not there. Eventually, at 4 p.m., Griffin began moving his brigade towards the action, but by this point, Pope's army was in full retreat and a mass of wagons and stragglers were blocking the roadway. Additionally, the bridge over Cub Run was broken, making it impossible for him to move any further west.

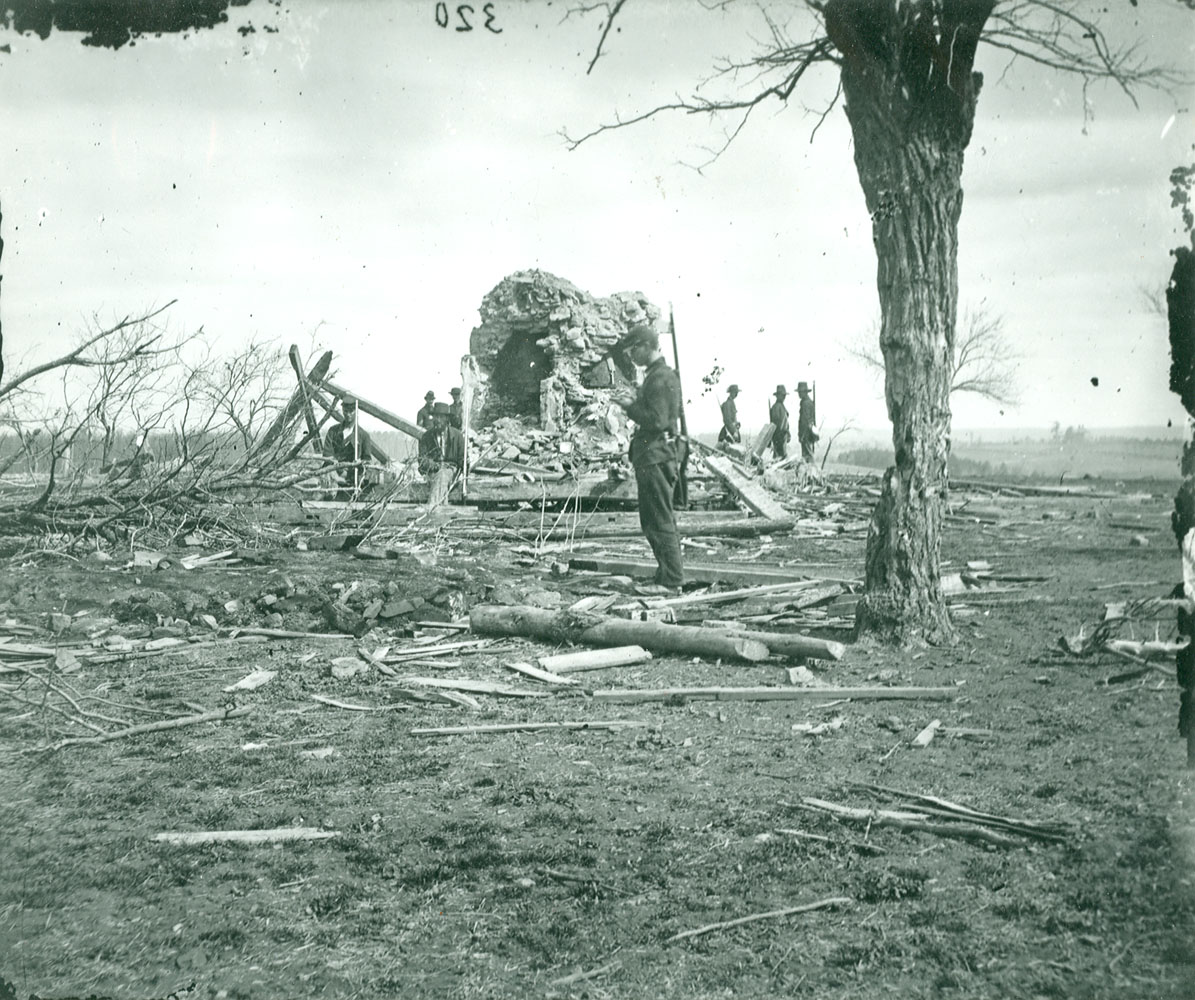
Soldiers stand next to a completely destroyed Henry House in 1862

As Ricketts's division approached the Confederate lines, it became clear that the enemy was still there in force and was showing no sign of retreating. Pope, unnerved by these reports, contemplated waiting for McClellan to arrive with the II and VI Corps, but then worried that McClellan would take credit for any victory in the battle, so he decided to attack immediately rather than wait. Shortly after noon, Pope issued orders for Porter's corps, supported by Hatch and Reynolds, to advance west along the turnpike. At the same time, Ricketts, Kearny, and Hooker were to advance on the Confederate left. This dual movement would potentially crush the retreating Confederates. But the Confederates were not retreating, and were in fact hoping to be attacked. Lee was still waiting for an opportunity to counterattack with Longstreet's force. Although he was not certain that Pope would attack that day, Lee positioned 18 artillery pieces under Col. Stephen D. Lee on high ground northeast of the Brawner Farm, ideally situated to bombard the open fields in front of Jackson's position.

Porter's corps was actually not in position to pursue west on the turnpike, but was in the woods north of the turnpike near Groveton. It took about two hours to prepare the assault on Jackson's line, ten brigades numbering roughly 10,000 men, with 28 artillery pieces on Dogan Ridge to support them. On the right, Ricketts' division would support Heintzelman while Sigel's corps remained in reserve to the rear. Reynolds' division was stationed near Henry House Hill, with King's division on its right. Porter would strike Jackson's right flank with his 1st Division. Since General Morell was not present, command of the remaining troops fell to Brig. Gen Daniel Butterfield, the ranking brigadier in the division. George Sykes' division of regular army troops was held in reserve. As noon approached and the sun climbed high up in the sky, temperatures on the battlefield topped 90 °F.

The Confederates, however, attempted to strike the first blow. Elements of Hill's and Ewell's divisions came charging out of the woods and surprised some of Ricketts' men with a volley or two, but once again the Union artillery on Dogan Ridge was too much for them and after being blasted by shellfire, they withdrew back to the line of the unfinished railroad.

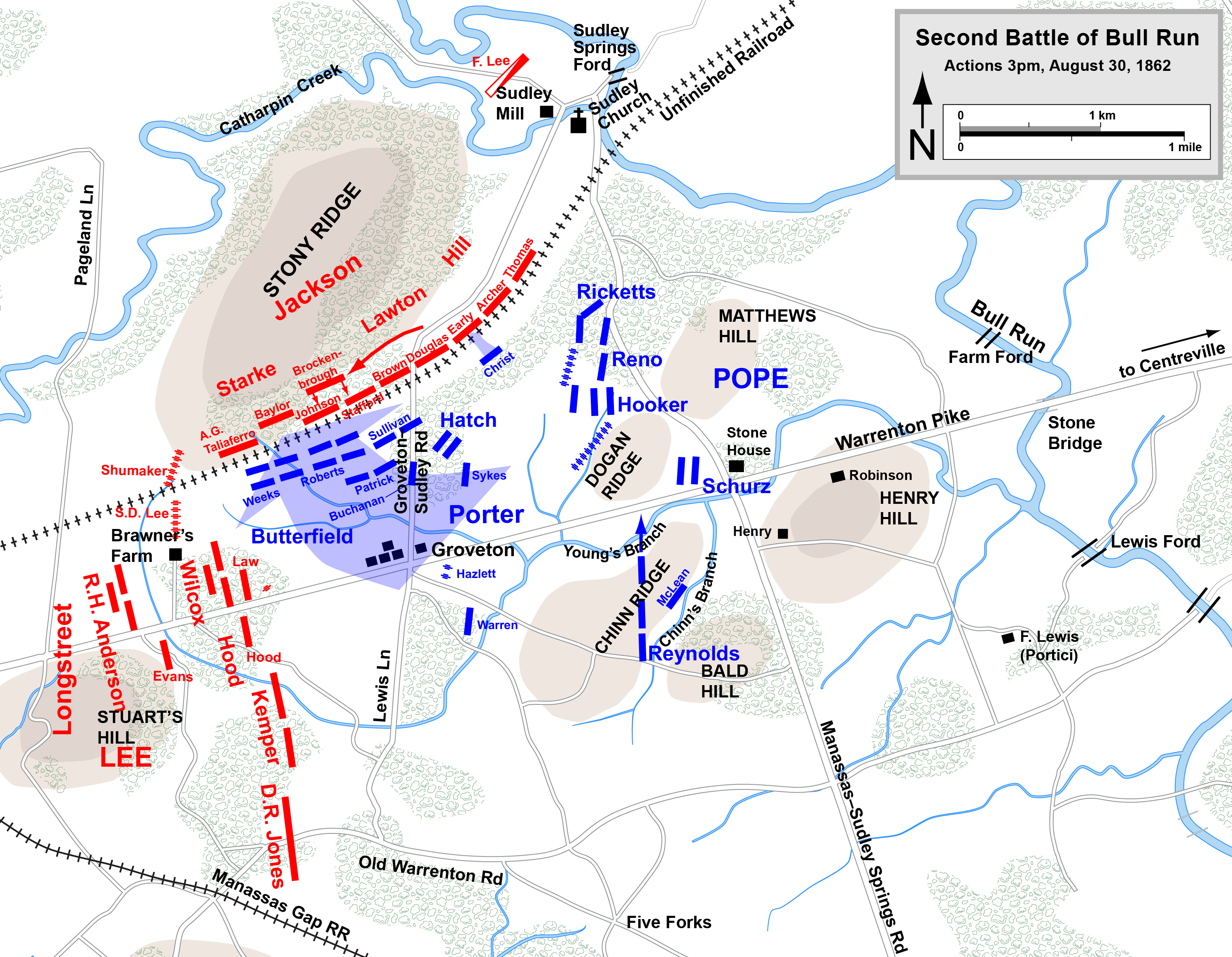
August 30, 3 p.m., Porter's attack

The Union men faced a formidable task. Butterfield's division had to cross 600 yards (550 m) of open pasture, land owned by widow Lucinda Dogan, the final 150 yards (140 m) of which were steeply uphill, to attack a strong position behind the unfinished railroad. Porter then ordered John Hatch's division to support Butterfield's right flank. Hatch formed his four brigades into a line of battle, the attack being spearheaded by his own brigade, now commanded by Col. Timothy Sullivan since he assumed division command the day earlier. Hatch's division had only 300 yards (270 m) to traverse, but was required to perform a complex right wheel maneuver under fire to hit the Confederate position squarely in its front. They experienced devastating fire from Stephen Lee's batteries and then withering volleys from the infantrymen in the line. In the confusion, Hatch was knocked from his horse by an artillery shell and taken off the field unconscious. Nevertheless, they were able to break the Confederate line, routing the 48th Virginia Infantry. The Stonewall Brigade rushed in to restore the line, taking heavy casualties, including its commander, Col. Baylor. In what was arguably the most famous incident of the battle, Confederates in Col. Bradley T. Johnson's and Col. Leroy A. Stafford's brigades fired so much that they ran out of ammunition and resorted to throwing large rocks at the 24th New York, causing occasional damage, and prompting some of the surprised New Yorkers to throw them back. To support Jackson's exhausted defense, which was stretched to the breaking point, Longstreet's artillery added to the barrage against Union reinforcements attempting to move in, cutting them to pieces. Hatch's brigade fell back in confusion, the men running into Patrick's brigade and causing them to also panic. The mob quickly contacted Gibbon's brigade, which remained some distance to the rear, while Doubleday's brigade had inexplicably wandered away from the field of action. Meanwhile, Butterfield's hard-pressed division was buckling under heavy Confederate musketry and artillery blasts and coming near to disintegrating.

Trying to shore up Butterfield's faltering attack, Porter ordered Lt. Col Robert C. Buchanan's brigade of regulars into action, but Longstreet's attack on the Union left interrupted him. The withdrawal was also a costly operation. Some of the jubilant Confederates in Starke's brigade attempted a pursuit, but were beaten back by the Union reserves posted along the Groveton-Sudley Road. Overall, Jackson's command was too depleted to counterattack, allowing Porter to stabilize the situation north of the turnpike. Concerned about Porter's situation, however, Irvin McDowell ordered Reynolds's division to leave Chinn Ridge and come to Porter's support. This may have been the worst tactical decision of the day because it left only 2,200 Union troops south of the turnpike, where they would soon face ten times their number of Confederates.

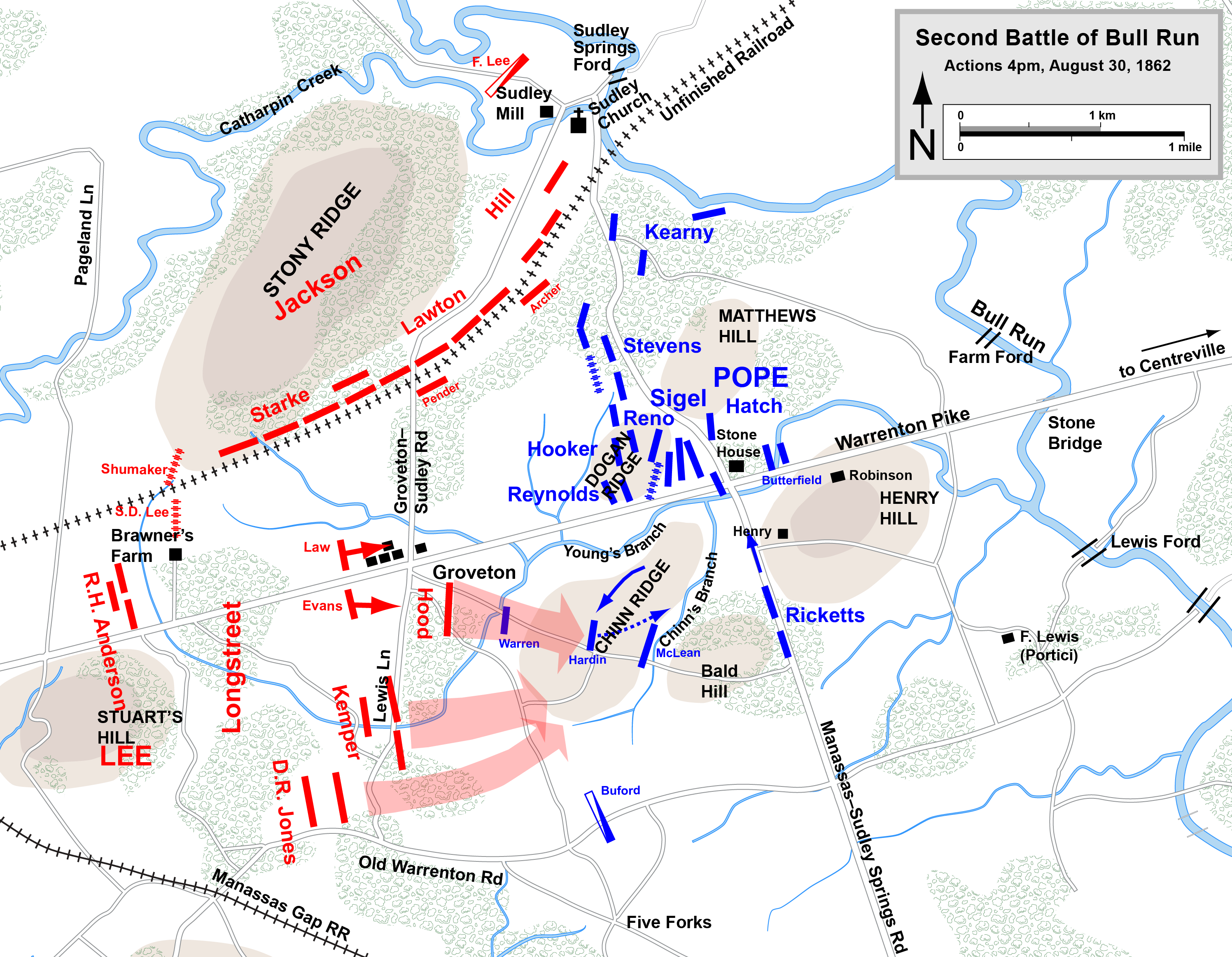
August 30, 4 p.m.: Start of Longstreet's attack

Lee and Longstreet agreed that the time was right for the long-awaited assault and that the objective would be Henry House Hill, which had been the key terrain in the First Battle of Bull Run, and which, if captured, would dominate the potential Union line of retreat. Longstreet's command of 25,000 men in five divisions stretched nearly a mile and a half from the Brawner Farm in the north to the Manassas Gap Railroad in the south. To reach the hill, they would have to traverse 1.5 to 2 miles (3.2 km) of ground containing ridges, streams, and some heavily wooded areas. Longstreet knew that he would not be able to project a well-coordinated battle line across this terrain, so he had to rely on the drive and initiative of his division commanders. The lead division, on the left, closest to the turnpike, was John Bell Hood's Texans, supported by Brig. Gen. Nathan G. "Shanks" Evans's South Carolinians. On Hood's right were Kemper's and Jones's divisions. Anderson's division was held in reserve. Just before the attack, Lee signaled to Jackson: "General Longstreet is advancing; look out for and protect his left flank."

Realizing what was happening down on the left, Porter told Buchanan to instead move in that direction to stem the Confederate onslaught and then also sent a messenger to find the other regular brigade, commanded by Col. Charles W. Roberts and get it into action. The Union defenders south of the turnpike consisted of only two brigades, commanded by Cols. Nathaniel C. McLean (Schenck's division, Sigel's I Corps) and Gouverneur K. Warren (Sykes's division, Porter's V Corps). McLean held Chinn Ridge, Warren was near Groveton, about 800 yards (730 m) further west. Hood's men began the assault at 4 p.m., immediately overwhelming Warren's two regiments, the 5th New York (Duryée's Zouaves) and 10th New York (the National Zouaves). Within the first 10 minutes of contact, the 500 men of the 5th New York had suffered almost 300 casualties, 120 of them mortally wounded. This was the largest loss of life of any infantry regiment in a single battle during the entire war. The Zouave regiments had been wearing bright red and blue uniforms, and one of Hood's officers wrote that the bodies lying on the hill reminded him of the Texas countryside when the wildflowers were in bloom. (Note: Martin claims that this was the largest Union infantry regiment loss of the war.)

While all this was going on, Pope was at his headquarters behind Dogan Ridge, oblivious to the chaos unfurling to the south. Instead, he was focused on a message he had just received from Henry Halleck announcing that the II and VI Corps, plus Brig. Gen Darius Couch's division of the IV Corps, were on the way to reinforce him, and moreover, McClellan had been ordered to stay behind in Washington, D.C. This would give Pope 41 brigades, all of them completely under his command and with no interference from McClellan whatsoever. Only after Warren had collapsed and McLean was being driven from the field did Pope finally realize what was happening.

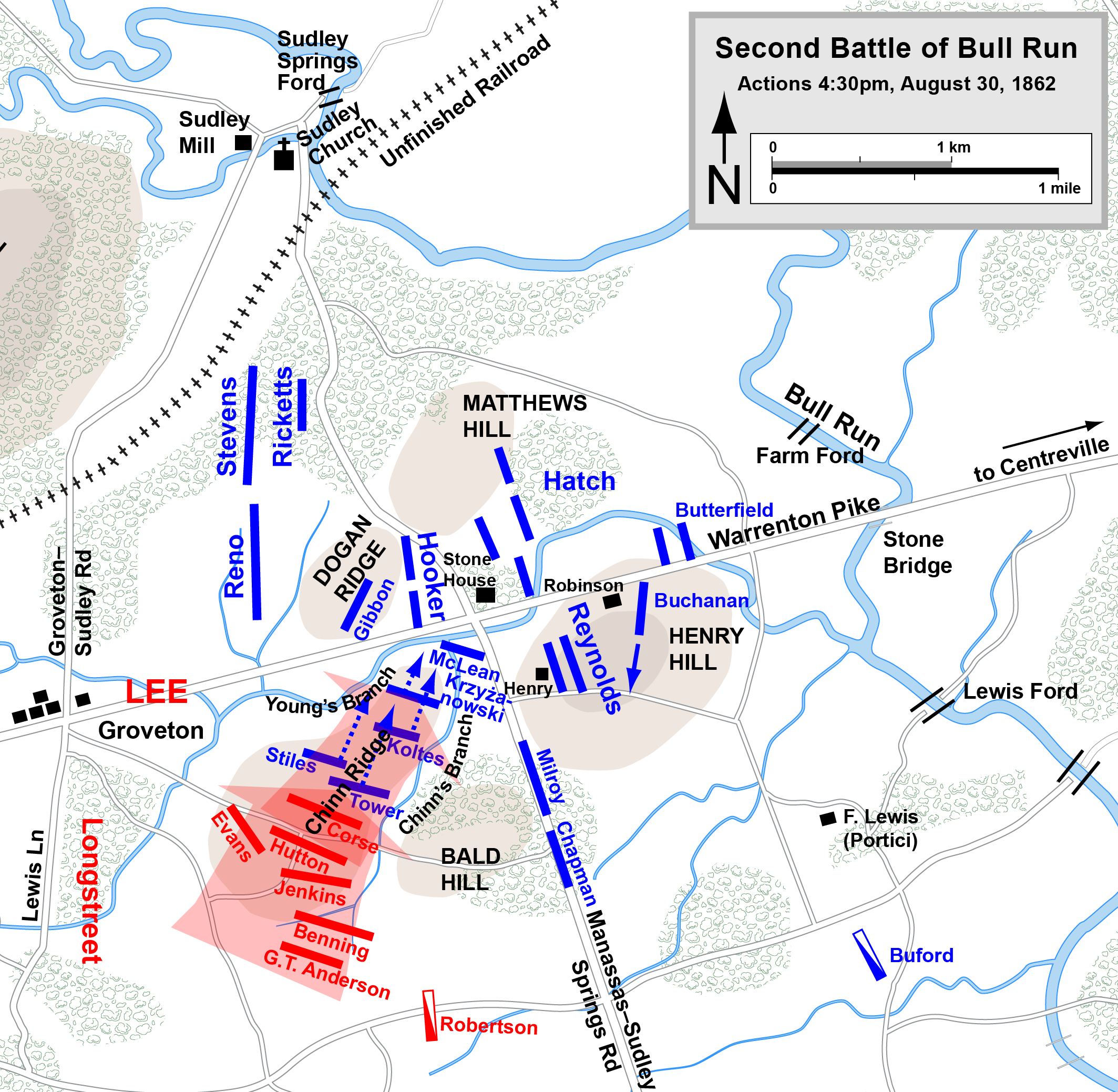
August 30, 4:30 p.m.: Union defense of Chinn Ridge

McDowell ordered Ricketts' division to disengage from its attack on the Confederate left, which had also failed to achieve any breakthrough, and reinforce the Union left. McDowell rode out with Reynolds to supervise the construction of the new line of defense on Chinn Ridge, just as Porter's shattered troops came running out of the woods to the west. Reynolds protested the order to move to Chinn Ridge, arguing that his division was needed to prevent a Confederate attack from the woods. McDowell, however, told Reynolds that the Confederate attack was not coming from that direction, but from the south and to move his division there immediately. Even before this happened, one of Reynolds' brigade commanders, Col. Martin Hardin (commanding Brig. Gen Conrad F. Jackson's brigade after Jackson had called in sick the previous day), took the initiative by himself and marched down to stem the Confederate onslaught. Taking with him Battery G of the 1st Pennsylvania Artillery, Hardin's brigade unleashed a volley of musket fire that stunned the 1st and 4th Texas regiments, but the 5th Texas to the right kept coming on and quickly shot down most of the gunners of Battery G. Nathan Evans' South Carolina brigade now arrived to reinforce the Texans and got in the rear of Hardin's brigade. Hardin fell wounded and command of the brigade devolved on Col. James Kirk of the 10th Pennsylvania Reserves. Kirk was shot down within minutes and a lieutenant colonel took over. The crumbling remains of the brigade fell back, some soldiers pausing to take shots at the oncoming Confederates. Nathaniel McLean's brigade of Ohioans arrived on the scene, but was assailed on three sides by the brigades of Law, Wilcox, and Evans, and soon joined the survivors of Hardin's brigade in a disorganized mob on Henry House Hill.

The first two Union brigades to arrive were from Ricketts's division, commanded by Brig. Gen. Zealous B. Tower and Col. Fletcher Webster, temporarily commanding Col. John Stiles' brigade. James Ricketts had been at the same battlefield a year earlier, at First Bull Run, where he had commanded a regular gun battery and had been captured at the fight for Henry Hill. Tower's brigade slammed Wilcox's Alabamians in the flank and sent them reeling, but was then immediately confronted with the fresh Confederate division of David R. Jones. Webster lined up his four regiments to face the Confederate attackers, but was struck by an artillery shell and collapsed dead on the field. Disheartened by Webster's death, his men began to fall back. Meanwhile, Tower was shot from his horse and carried off the field unconscious. Robert Schenck then ordered Col. John Koltes' brigade, which had been held in reserve during Sigel's attack on the Confederate left the previous day and was fresh, into action, along with Wlodzimierz Krzyzanowski's brigade, which had been heavily engaged and was tired. Koltes however was quickly struck by an artillery shell and killed. Overall command devolved onto Col. Richard Coulter of the 11th Pennsylvania, the highest-ranking officer remaining on the field, and a Mexican War veteran. Although Koltes and Krzyzanowski's six regiments held their ground for a little while, they were quickly overwhelmed by yet more fresh Confederates in the brigades of Lewis Armistead, Montgomery Corse, and Eppa Hunton and started to fall back in disorder.

R.H. Anderson failed to avail himself of the most significant advantage three hours of fighting on Chinn Ridge and Henry Hill had forged. Because he did not, the Confederates' last opportunity to destroy Pope's army dwindled with the day's light.

— John J. Hennessy, Return to Bull Run

During the first two hours of the Confederate assault, McDowell had constructed a new line of defense consisting of Reynolds' and Sykes' divisions. Longstreet's last fresh troops, Richard Anderson's division now took the offensive. The regulars of George Sykes's division along with Meade and Seymour's brigades, plus Piatt's brigade, formed a line on Henry House Hill that held off this final Confederate attack long enough to give the rest of the army time to withdraw across Bull Run Creek to Centreville.

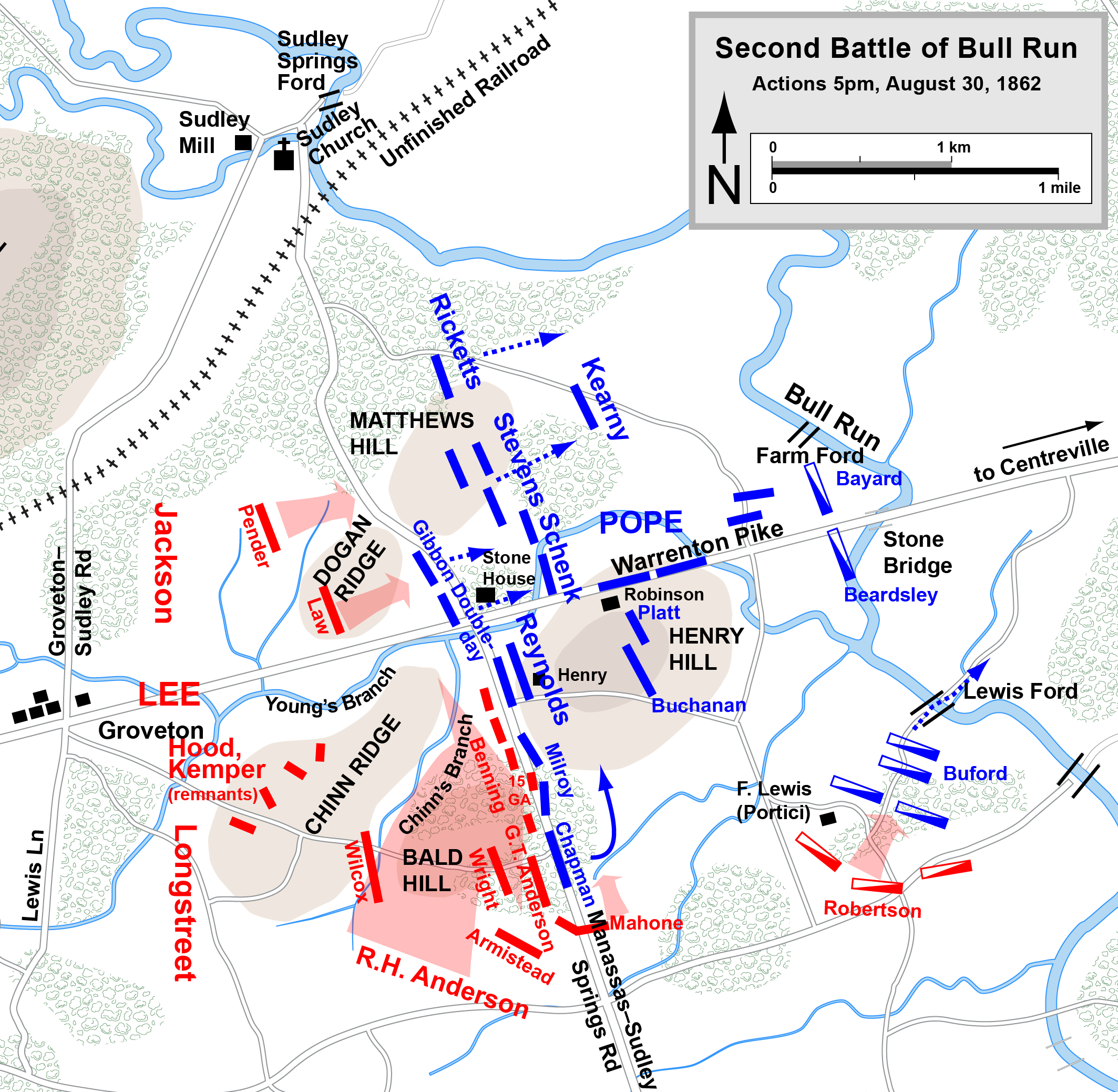
August 30, 5 p.m.: Final Confederate attacks, beginning of the Union retreat

Stonewall Jackson, under relatively ambiguous orders from Lee to support Longstreet, launched an attack north of the turnpike at 6 p.m., probably as soon as his exhausted forces could be mustered. Historian John J. Hennessy called Jackson's delays "one of the battle's great puzzles" and "one of the most significant Confederate failures" of the battle, greatly reducing the value of his advance. The attack coincided with Pope's ordered withdrawal of units north of the turnpike to assist in the Henry House Hill defense and the Confederates were able to overrun a number of artillery and infantry units in their fierce assault. By 7 p.m., however, Pope had established a strong defensive line that aligned with the units on Henry House Hill. At 8 p.m., he ordered a general withdrawal on the turnpike to Centreville. Unlike the calamitous retreat at the First Battle of Bull Run, the Union movement was quiet and orderly. The Confederates, weary from battle and low on ammunition, did not pursue in the darkness. Although Lee had won a great victory, he had not achieved his objective of destroying Pope's army.

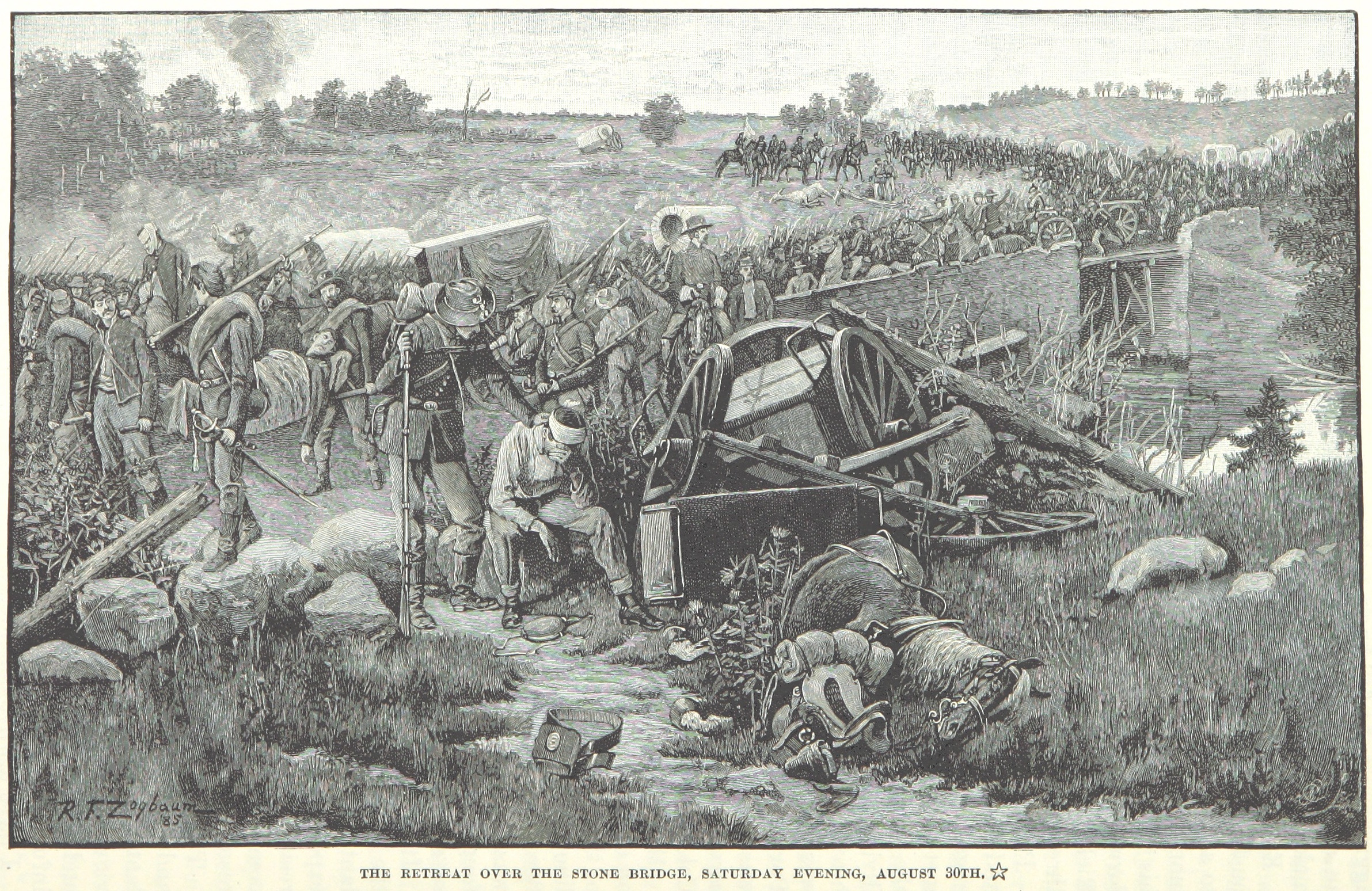
Union troops retreat after the battle

The final significant action of the battle occurred around 7:00 PM as Lee directed J.E.B. Stuart's cavalry to go around the Union flank and cut off their retreat. Brig. Gen Beverly Robertson's cavalry brigade, accompanied by Col. Thomas Rosser's 5th Virginia Cavalry headed for Lewis Ford, a crossing in Bull Run Creek that would enable them to get in the rear of the Union army. However, Robertson and Rosser found the crossing blocked by John Buford's cavalry and after a short, but fierce engagement, Buford's superior numbers won out and the Confederate horsemen pulled back. The cavalry clash lasted only about ten minutes, but resulted in Col. Thomas Munford of the 2nd Virginia Cavalry being wounded. Col. Thornton Brodhead of the 1st Michigan Cavalry was shot dead, and John Buford was also wounded. The Union army's retreat however had been safeguarded.

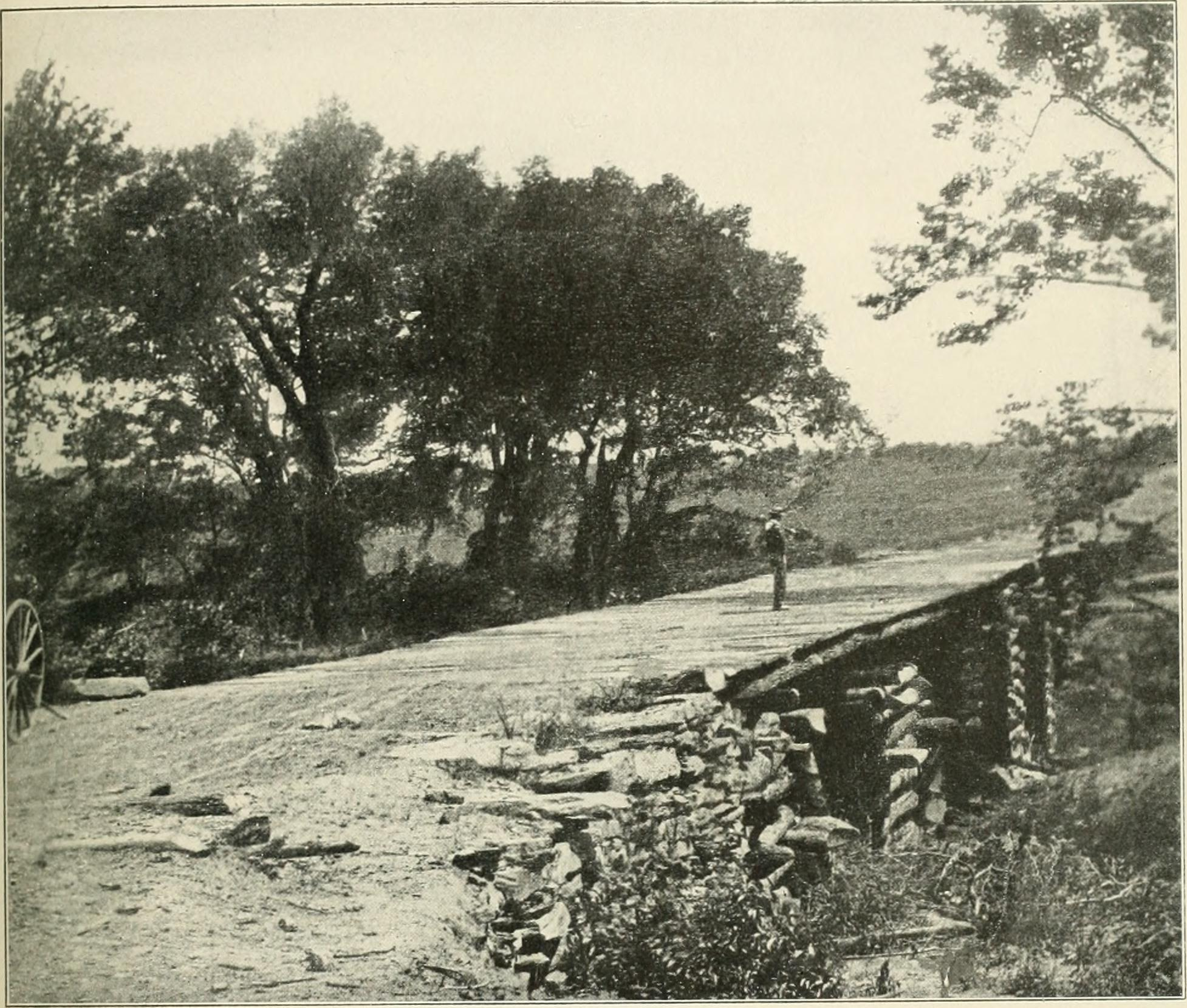
Bridge crossed by the Union troops retreating to Centreville

== Aftermath ==
=== Casualties ===
The Second Battle of Manassas, like the First (July 21, 1861), was a significant tactical victory for the Confederates and was another blow to Union morale. Union casualties were about 14,462 (1,747 killed, 8,452 wounded, and 4,263 captured or missing ) out of 70,000 engaged; the Confederates casualties were about 7,387 (1,096 killed, 6,202 wounded, and 89 captured or missing) out of 55,000 engaged.

=== Chantilly ===
As the Union army concentrated on Centreville, Lee planned his next move. He sent Jackson on another flanking march in an attempt to interpose his army between Pope and Washington. Pope countered the move and the two forces clashed a final time at the Battle of Chantilly (also known as Ox Hill) on September 1. Lee immediately began his next campaign on September 3, when the vanguard of the Army of Northern Virginia crossed the Potomac River, marching toward a fateful encounter with the Army of the Potomac in the Maryland campaign and the Battle of Antietam.

=== Pope relieved of command ===
A splendid army almost demoralized, millions of public property given up or destroyed, thousands of lives of our best men sacrificed for no purpose. I dare not trust myself to speak of this commander [Pope] as I feel and believe. Suffice to say ... that more insolence, superciliousness, ignorance, and pretentiousness were never combined in one man. It can in truth be said of him that he had not a friend in his command from the smallest drummer boy to the highest general officer.

— Brig. Gen. Alpheus S. Williams (II Corps division commander)

Pope was relieved of command on September 12, and his army was merged into the Army of the Potomac as it marched into Maryland under McClellan. He spent the remainder of the war in the Department of the Northwest in Minnesota, dealing with the Dakota War of 1862. Pope sought scapegoats to spread the blame for his defeat. On November 25, Fitz John Porter was arrested and court-martialed for his actions on August 29. Porter was found guilty on January 10, 1863, of disobedience and misconduct, and he was dismissed from the Army on January 21. He spent most of the remainder of his life fighting against the verdict. In 1878, a special commission under General John M. Schofield exonerated Porter by finding that his reluctance to attack Longstreet probably saved Pope's Army of Virginia from an even greater defeat. Eight years later, President Chester A. Arthur reversed Porter's sentence.

=== Longstreet criticized ===
James Longstreet was criticized for his performance during the battle and the postbellum advocates of the Lost Cause claimed that his slowness, reluctance to attack, and disobedience to Gen. Lee on August 29 were a harbinger of his controversial performance to come on July 2, 1863, at the Battle of Gettysburg. Lee's biographer, Douglas Southall Freeman, wrote: "The seeds of much of the disaster at Gettysburg were sown in that instant—when Lee yielded to Longstreet and Longstreet discovered that he would."

== Battlefield preservation ==
Part of the site of the battle is now Manassas National Battlefield Park. Located north of Manassas, in Prince William County, Virginia, it preserves the site of two major American Civil War battles: the First Battle of Bull Run on July 21, 1861, and the Second Battle of Bull Run which was fought between August 28 and August 30, 1862 (also known as the First Battle of Manassas and the Second Battle of Manassas, respectively). The peaceful Virginia countryside bore witness to clashes between the armies of the North (Union) and the South (Confederacy), and it was there that Confederate General Thomas J. Jackson acquired his nickname "Stonewall". The American Battlefield Trust and its partners have acquired and preserved 373 acres (1.51 km^{2}) of the Second Battle of Bull Run battlefield in more than 10 transactions since 2000.

== Historic photographs ==
=== Gallery ===
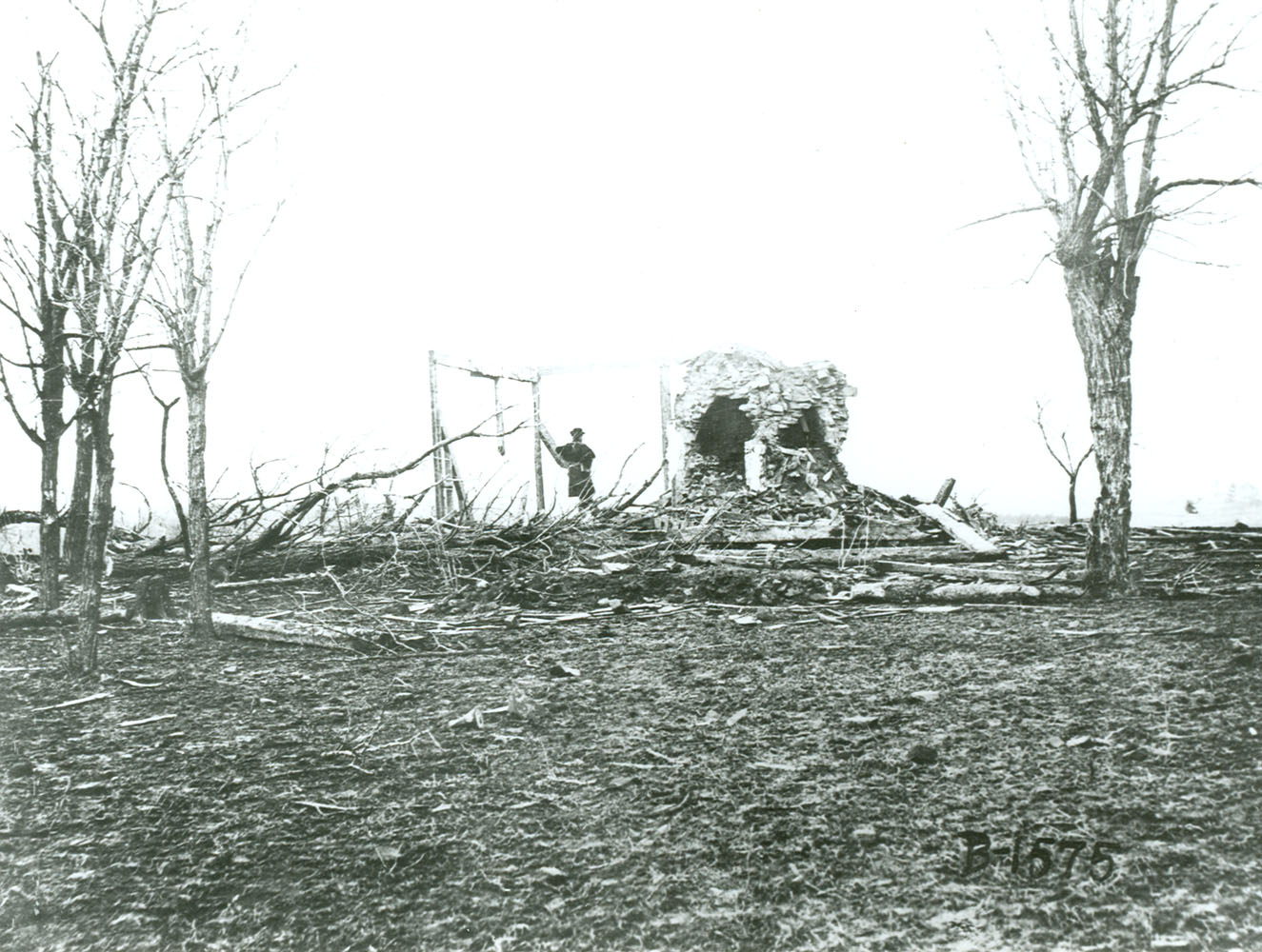
Soldiers stand next to a completely destroyed Henry House in 1862

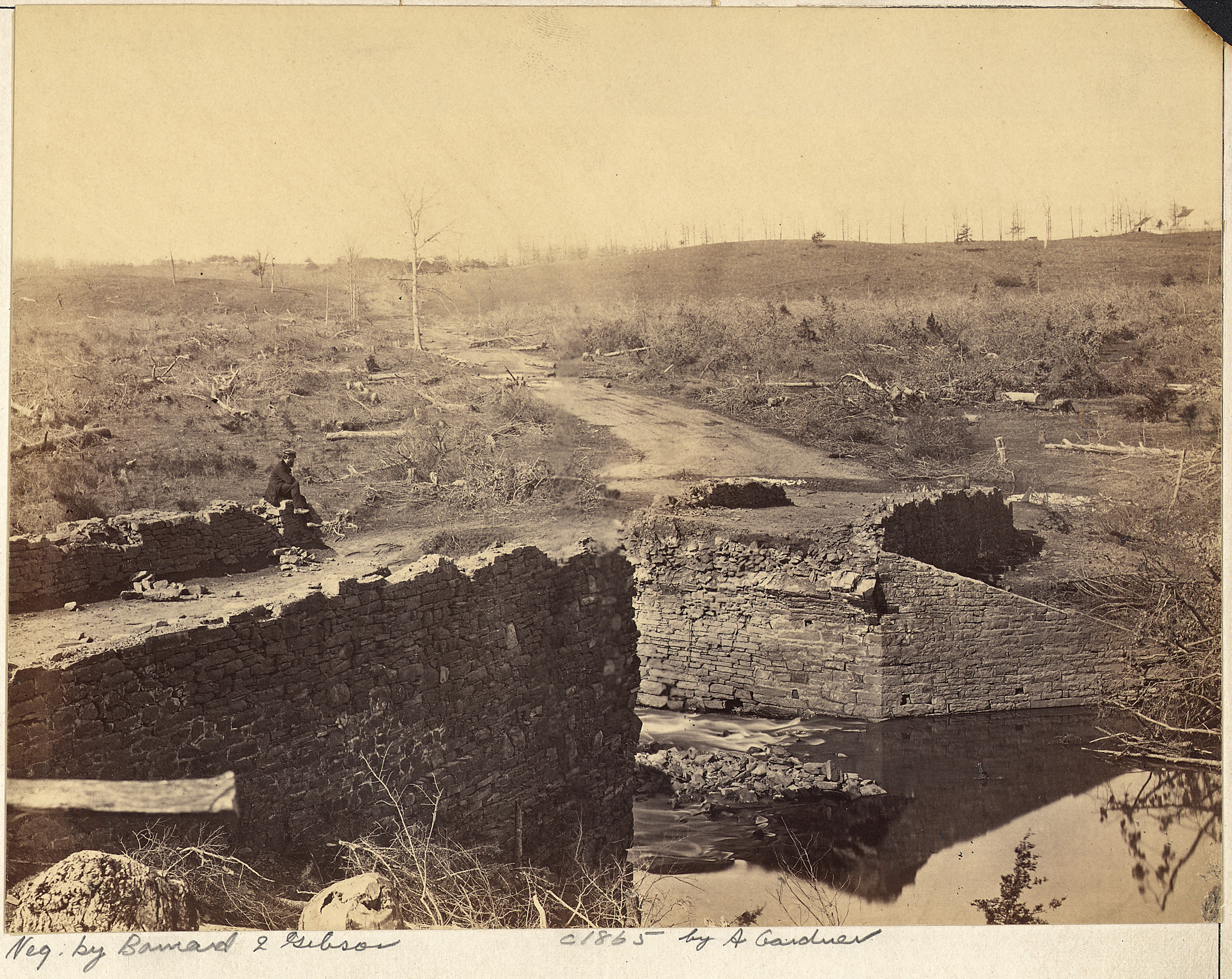
Virginia, Bull Run. Ruins of Stone Bridge, 1862

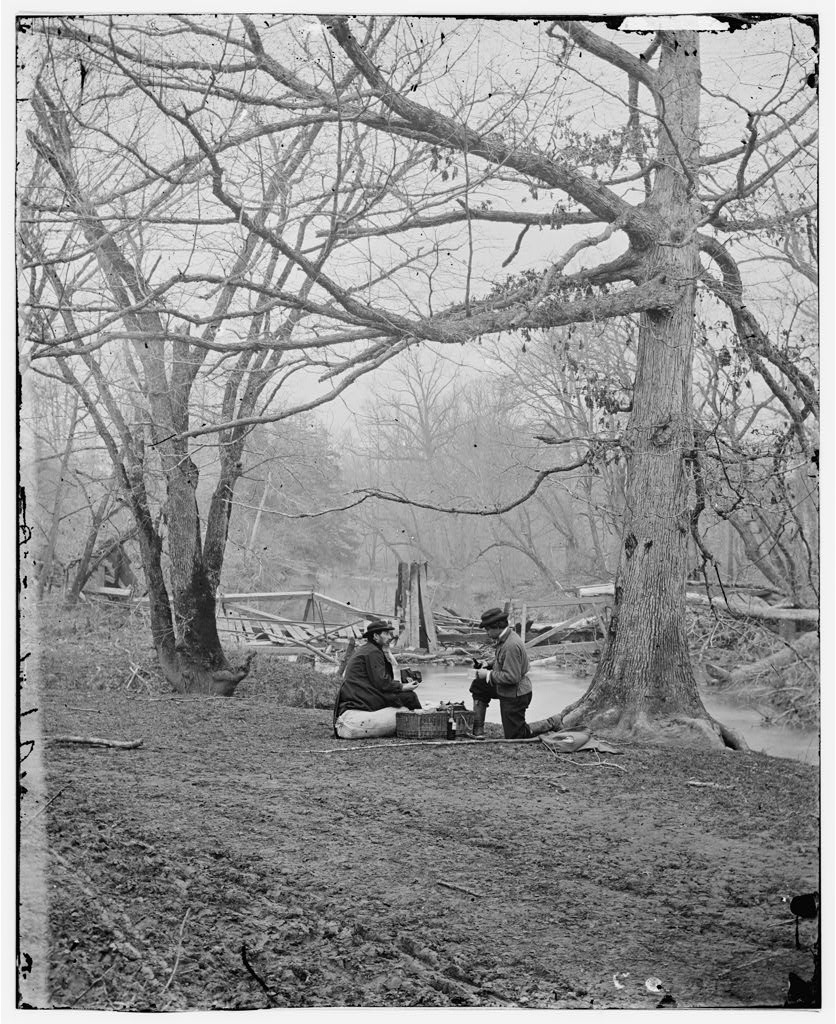
Ruins of a CS railroad bridge at Blackburns Ford on Bull Run river south east of the Stone Bridge at Bull Run. Railroad was built by the Confederate army to run supplies to the army encamped some 5 miles from Manassas Junction

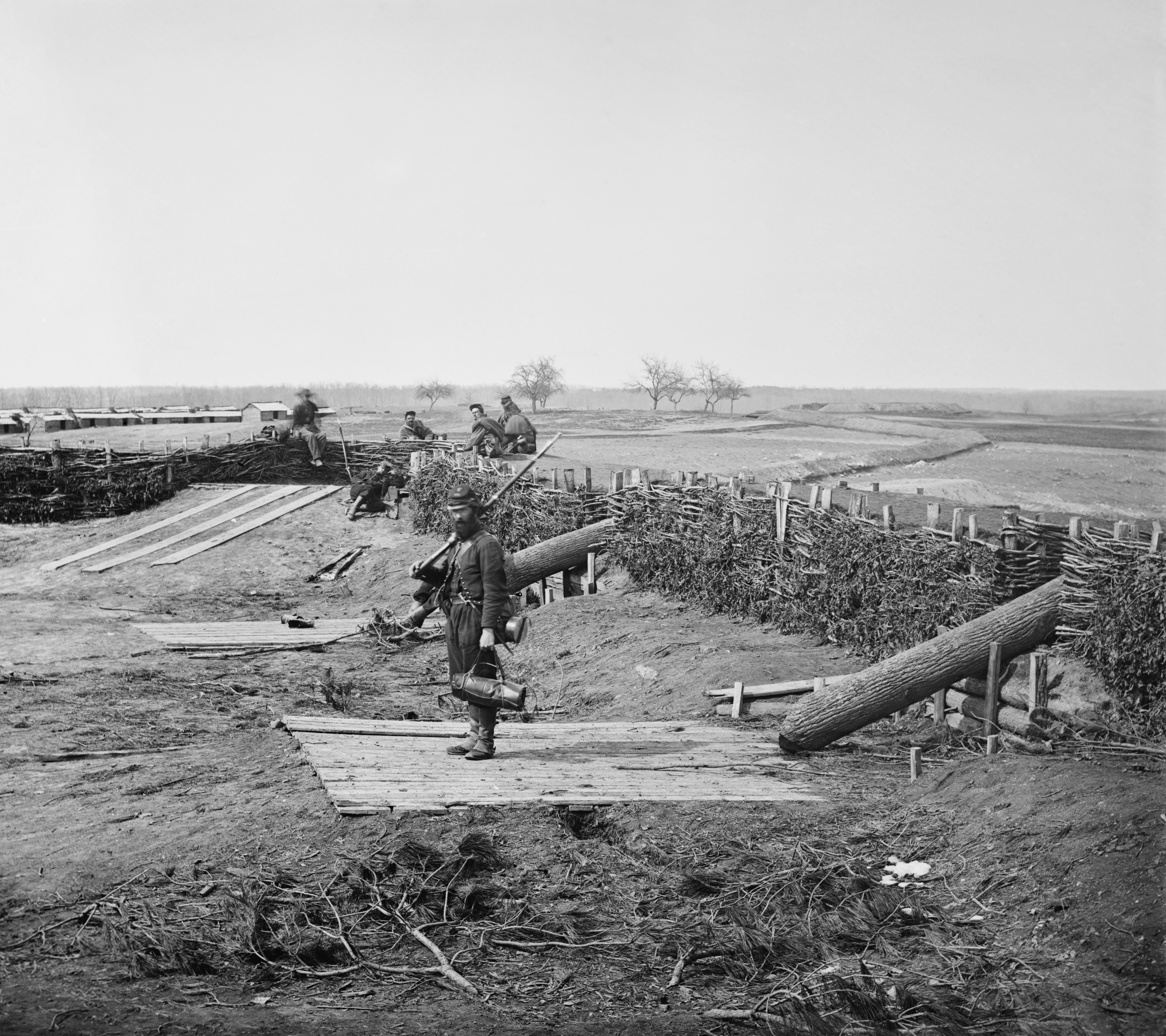
"Quaker guns" (logs used as ruses to imitate cannons) in former Confederate fortifications at Manassas Junction Centreville, VA

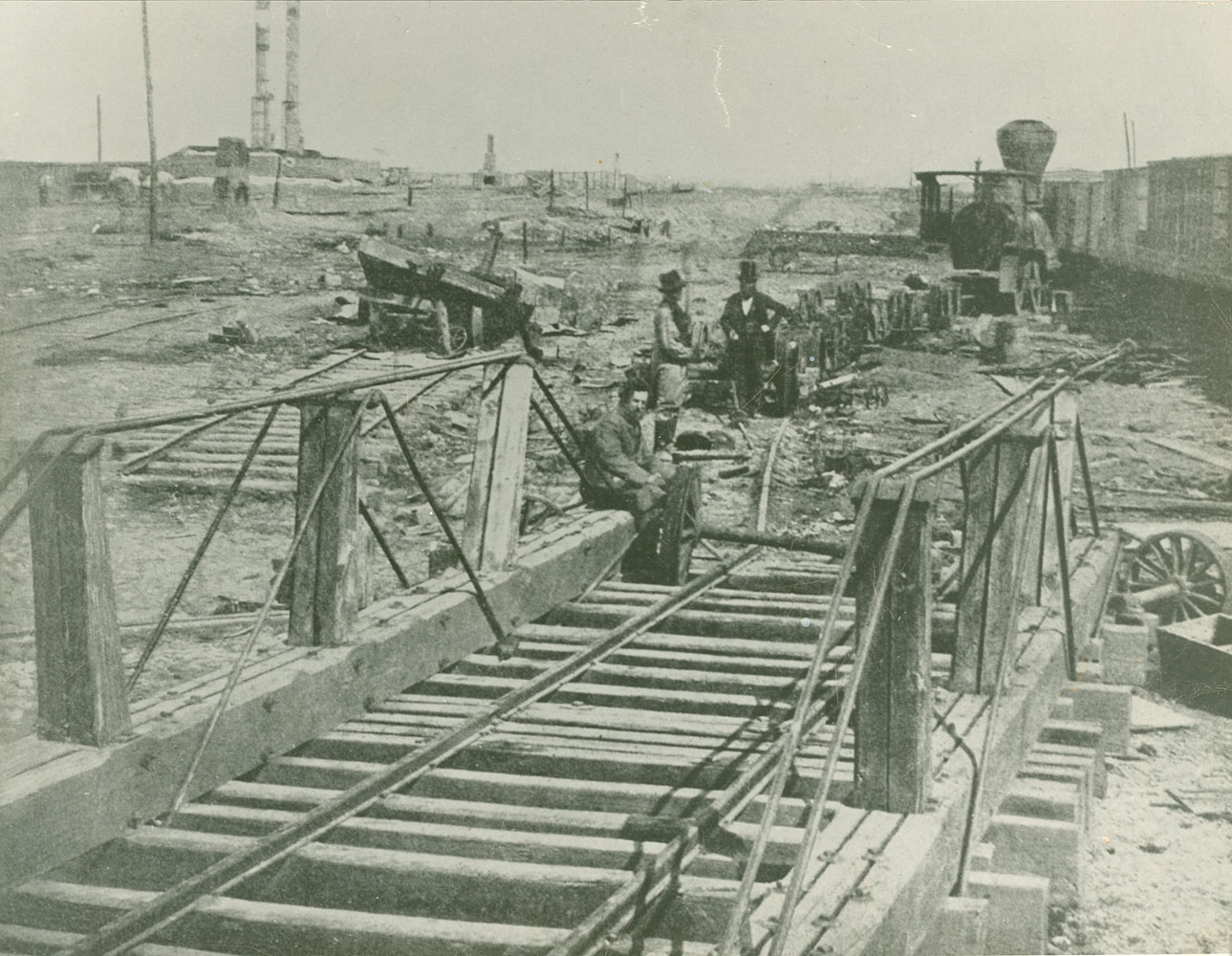
A group of men stand near the Manassas Railroad Junction railroad tracks in 1862 with a train in the background

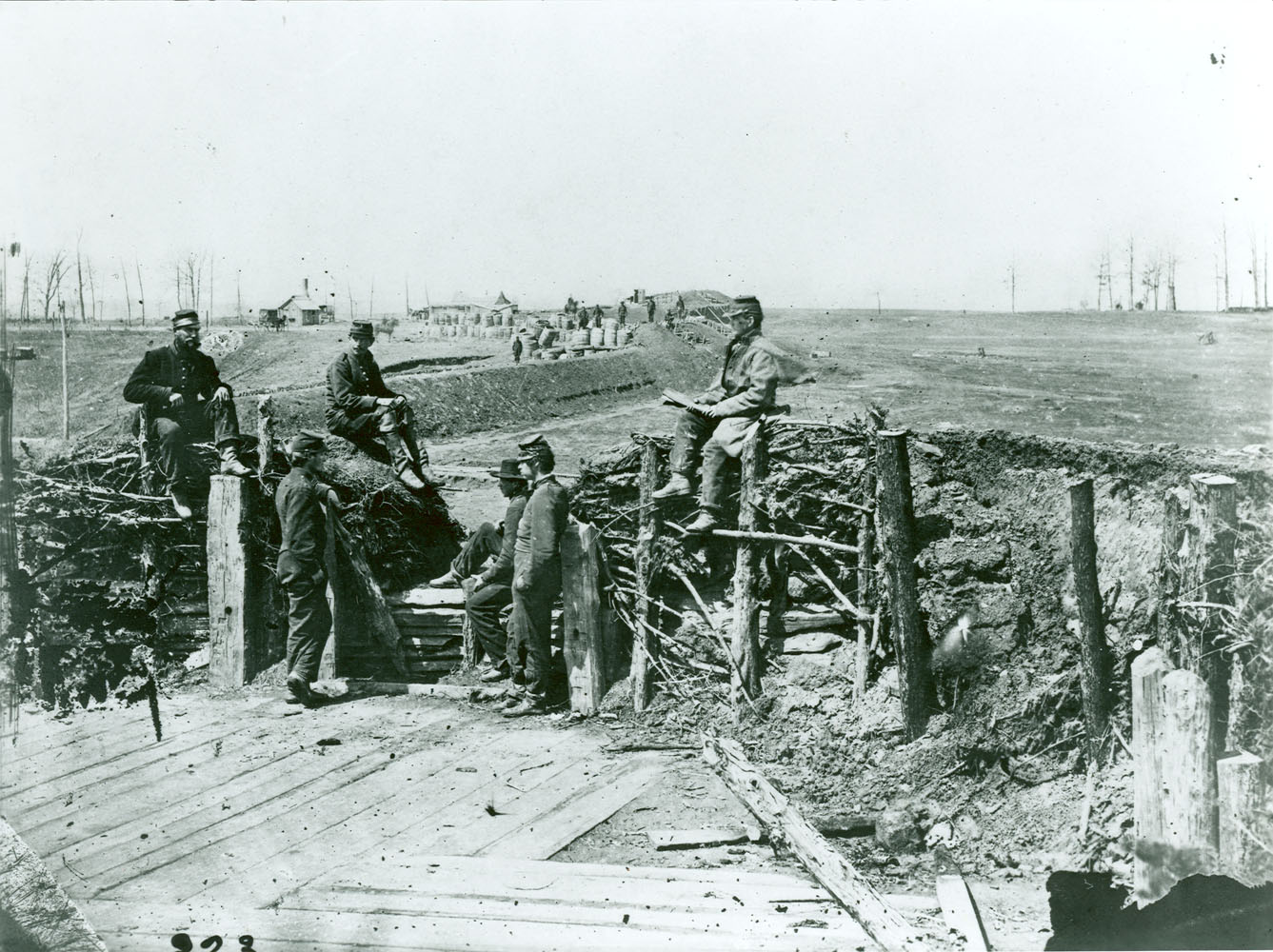
A group of men near Manassas Railroad Junction in 1862

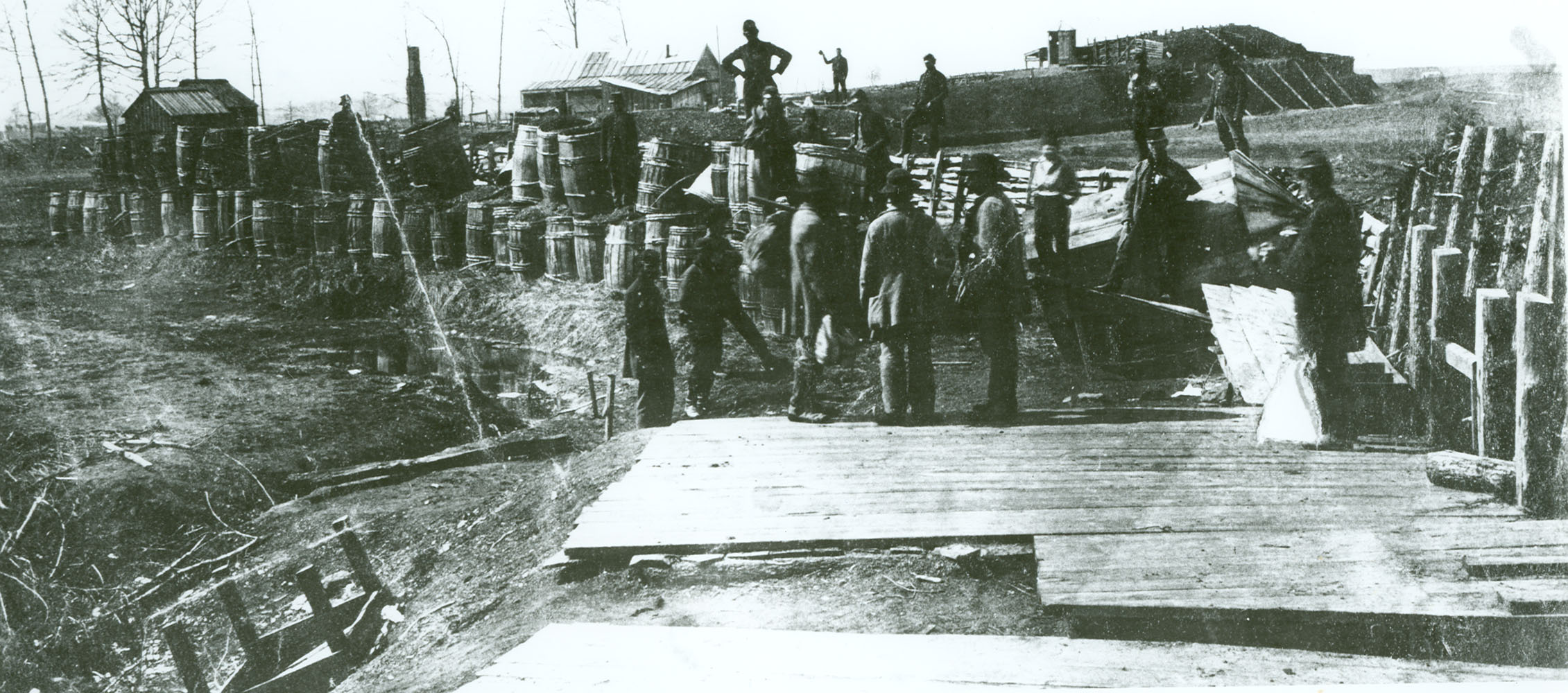
A group of men near Manassas Railroad Junction in 1862

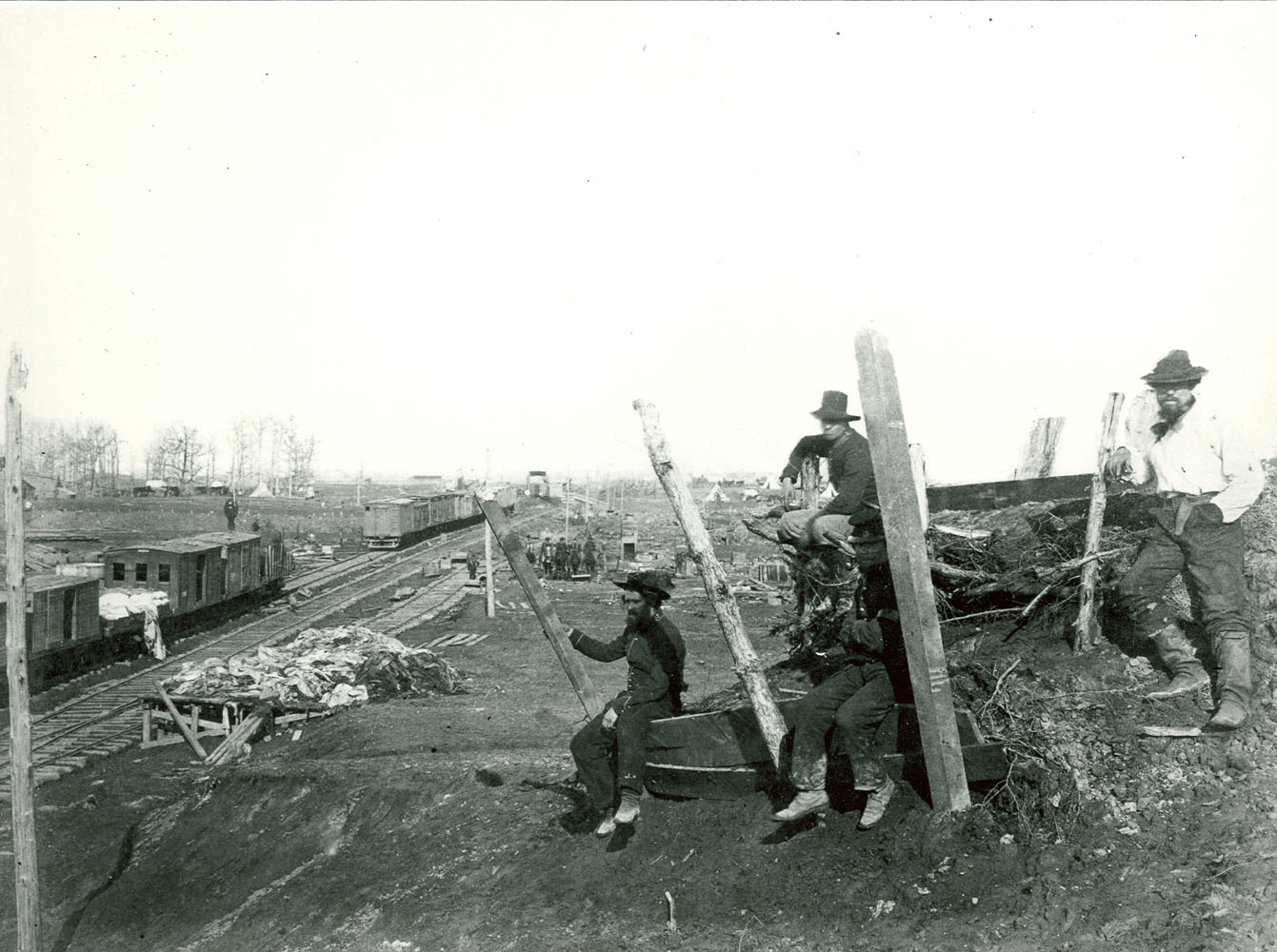
Men sit near the Manassas Junction railroad in 1862

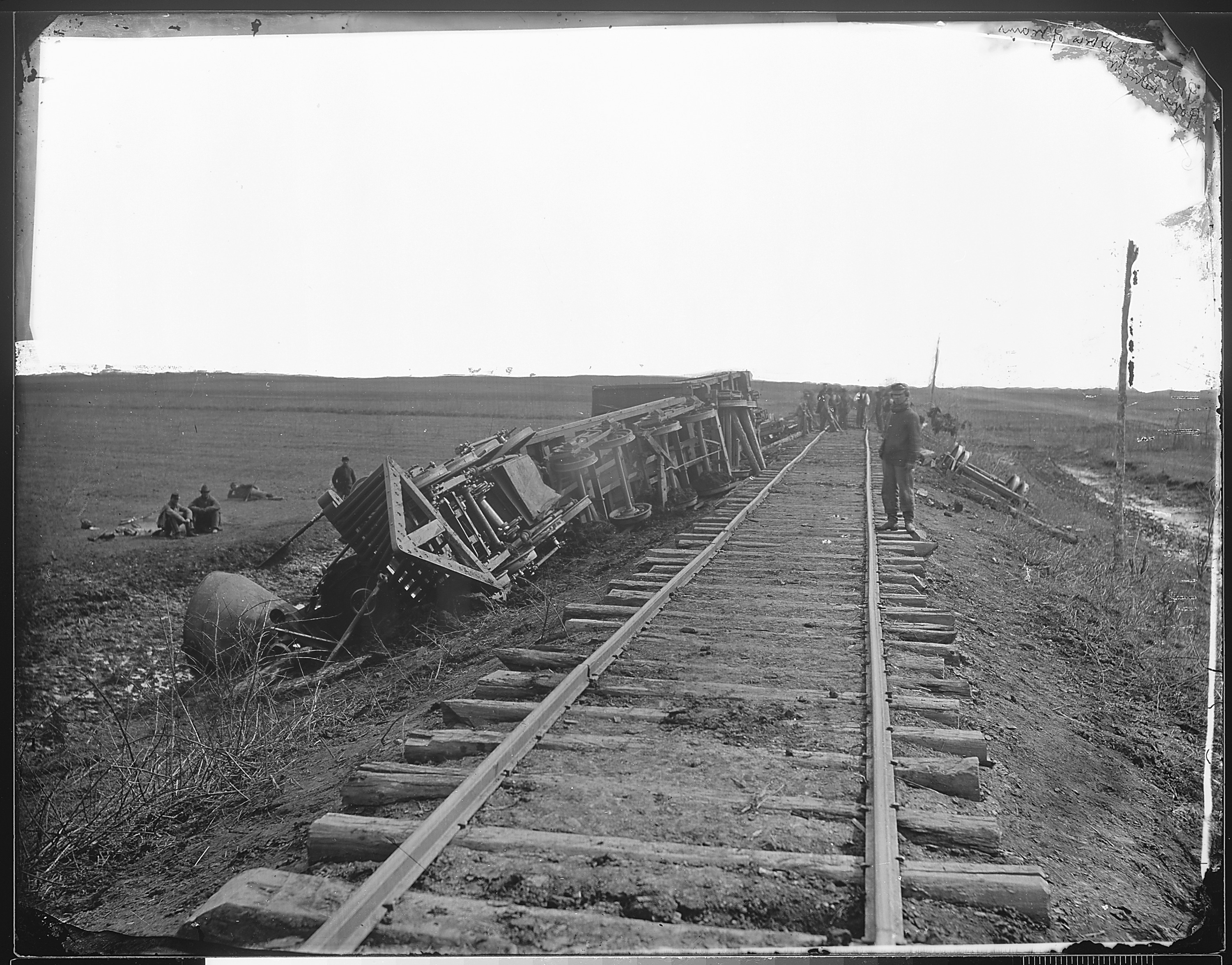
Picking up debris of trains after Pope's retreat

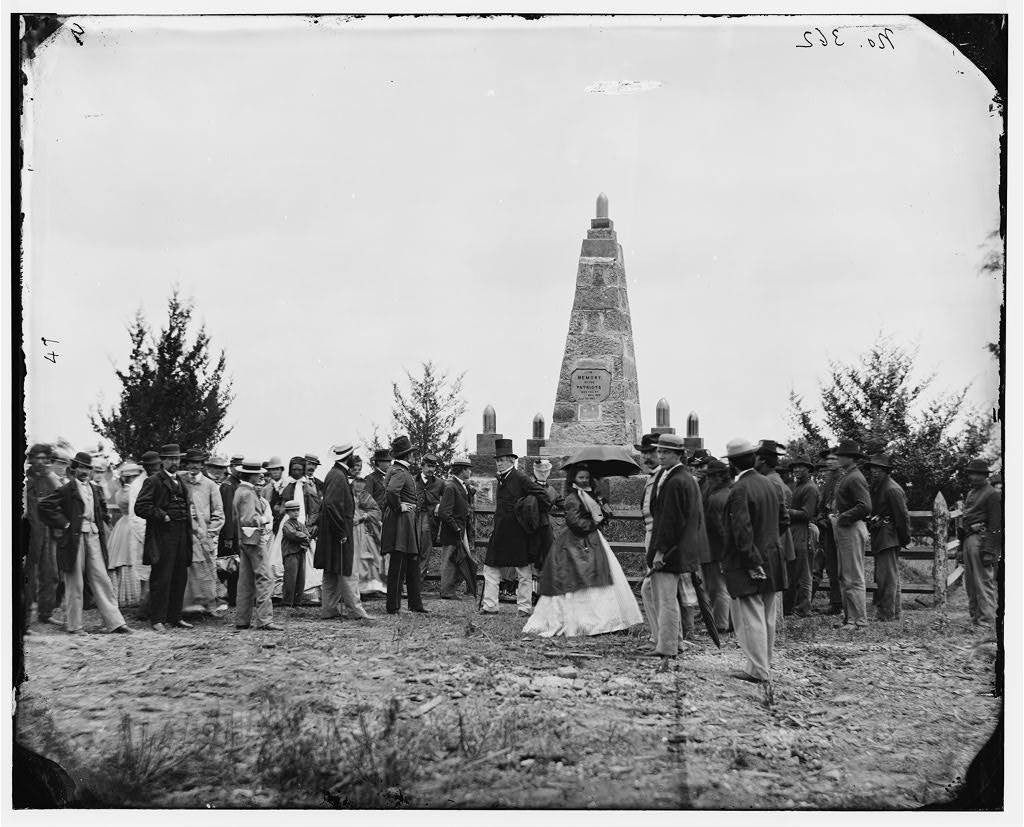
Bull Run, Va. Dedication of the battle monument; Judge Abram B. Olin of the District of Columbia Supreme Court, who delivered the address, stands by the rail.

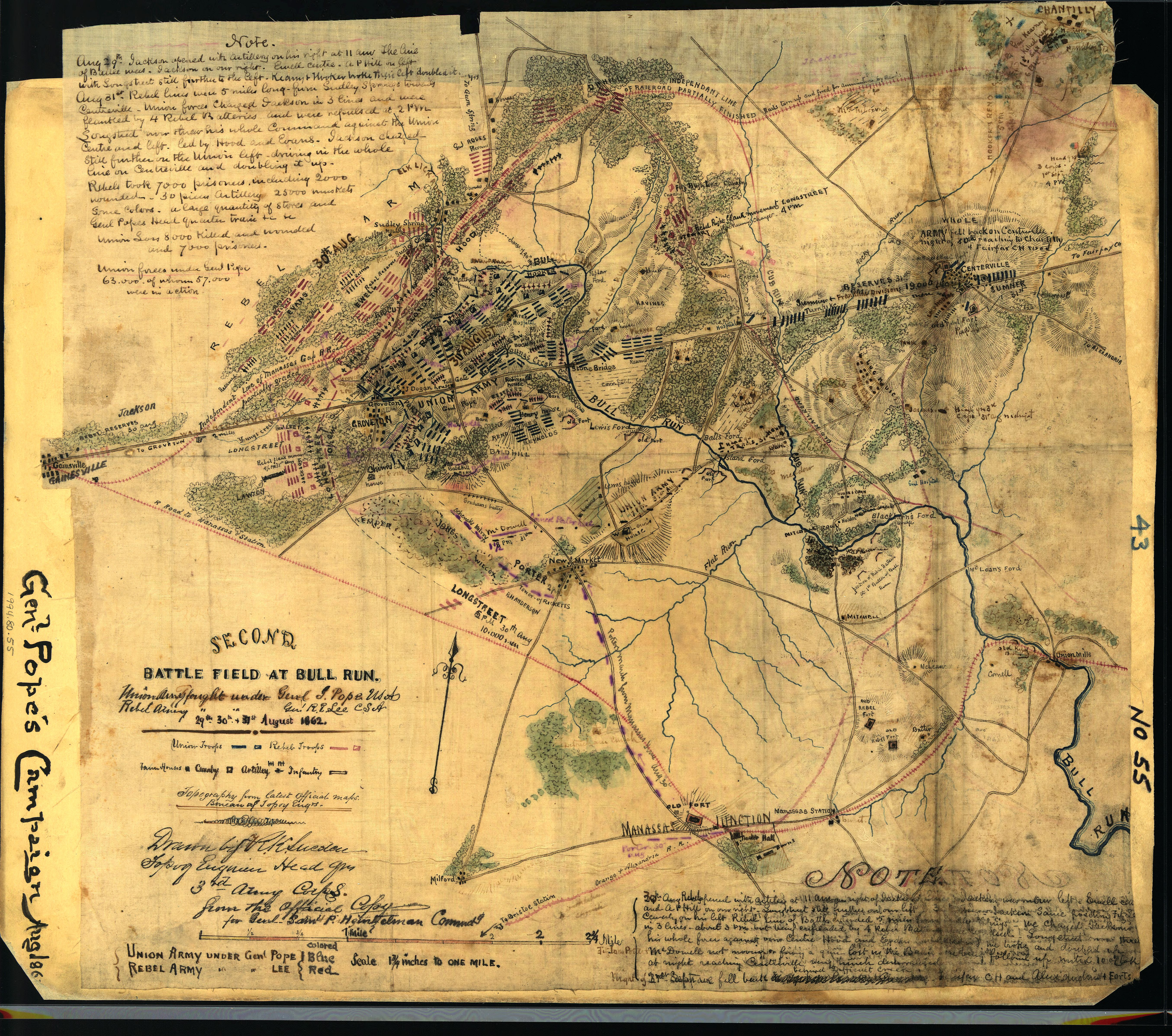
Battle map drafted by Sneden, Robert Knox, with notes on Union and Confederate strengths, casualties, done in pen and ink and water color

== See also ==
- List of American Civil War battles
- Armies in the American Civil War
- Manassas National Battlefield Park
- Clara Barton
- Peninsula campaign and Seven Days Battles
- Troop engagements of the American Civil War, 1862
- List of costliest American Civil War land battles
- Bibliography of the American Civil War
- Bibliography of Abraham Lincoln
- Bibliography of Ulysses S. Grant
