= Manassas Gap Railroad =

Railway line in Virginia

The Manassas Gap Railroad (MGRR) was a railroad that ran from Mount Jackson, Virginia, to the Orange and Alexandria Railroad's Manassas Junction, which later became the city of Manassas, Virginia. Chartered by the Virginia General Assembly in 1850, the MGRR was a 4 ft 8 in (1,422 mm) narrow gauge line whose 90 completed miles of track included 38 miles (61 km) of 60 pounds-per-yard T-rail and 52 miles (84 km) of 52 pounds-per-yard T-rail. A total of nine locomotives and 232 cars were operated on the line, serving 20 stations.

During the American Civil War, the Confederate Army used the railroad to move troops and raid the Baltimore and Ohio Railroad.

An extension to Harper's Ferry was planned and partially built, though the rail was never installed. Today, several portions of that unfinished roadbed, as well as some historic culverts and masonry, remain abandoned in Fairfax County.

== Founding and early history ==
With Edward Carrington Marshall as president and financial assistance from the Virginia Board of Public Works, construction was started westward in 1851 from a junction with the Orange and Alexandria Railroad (O&A) at Tudor Hall in Prince William County (a location the railroads called Manassas Junction). The tracks ran toward Front Royal and through Manassas Gap in the Blue Ridge Mountains to the Shenandoah Valley. It was completed to Strasburg in 1854. The railroad built south along the Shenandoah Valley, and reached Mount Jackson in Shenandoah County in 1859.

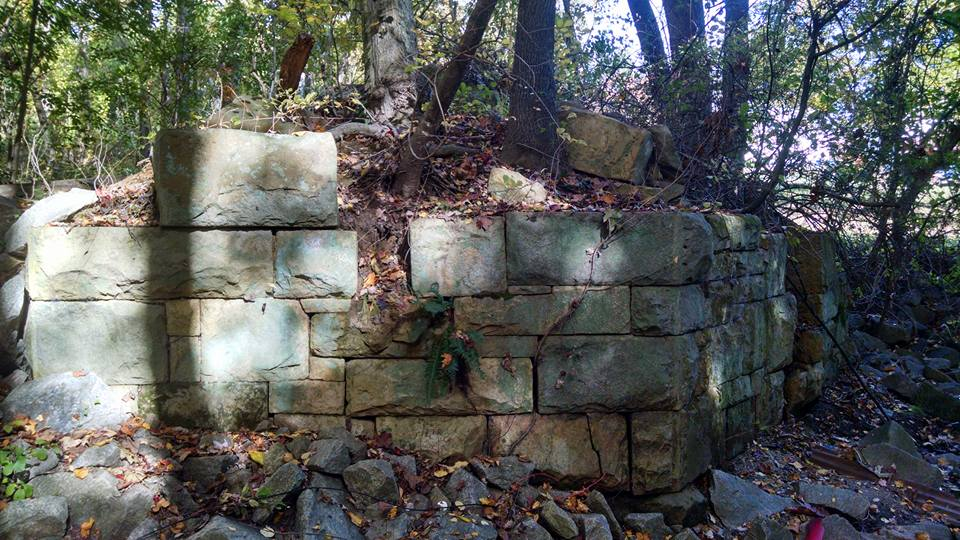
Stone bridge abutment for unfinished Manassas Gap Railroad crossing Indian Run Creek, located in Poe Terrace Park, Annandale, Virginia, USA.

The original plan included a branch through Loudoun County to connect to Harpers Ferry and the Baltimore and Ohio Railroad. Financial troubles and the American Civil War scuttled those plans. Similarly, efforts began in 1854 on the "Independent Line," 35 miles of track from Alexandria to Gainesville intended to bypass the O&A. The way was graded but never completed because of financial difficulties and the Civil War. (The line was never completed, thanks to an 1867 merger with the O&A that rendered it redundant.)

Stations on the Manassas Gap Railroad (MGRR)
Station	Distance
Manassas Junction	0 miles (0 km)
Gainesville, Virginia	8 miles (13 km)
Thoroughfare, Virginia	14 miles (23 km)
Broad Run, Virginia	17 miles (27 km)
The Plains, Virginia	20 miles (32 km)
Rectortown, Virginia	30 miles (48 km)
Piedmont, Virginia	34 miles (55 km)
Markham, Virginia	38 miles (61 km)
Linden, Virginia	43 miles (69 km)
Happy Creek, Virginia	? miles
Front Royal, Virginia	51 miles (82 km)
Riverton, Virginia	? miles
Buckton, Virginia	56 miles (90 km)
Waterlick, Virginia	? miles
Strasburg, Virginia	61 miles (98 km)
Toms Brook, Virginia	68 miles (109 km)
Woodstock, Virginia	75 miles (121 km)
Edinburg, Virginia	81 miles (130 km)
Mount Jackson, Virginia	87 miles (140 km)

=== American Civil War ===
The beginning of the American Civil War ended construction, and conflicts during the war destroyed much of the railroad.

==== 1861 ====
The Manassas Gap Railroad was used during the Great Train Raid of 1861, in which Colonel Thomas J. "Stonewall" Jackson of the Virginia militia raided the Baltimore and Ohio Railroad and removed, captured or burned 67 locomotives and 386 railway cars, and taking 19 of those locomotives and at least 80 railroad cars onto Confederate railroads. After initially trapping this rolling stock on the Virginia-controlled portion of the Baltimore & Ohio, Jackson immediately "helped himself to four small locomotives not too heavy for the flimsy flat-bar rails of the Winchester and Potomac Railroad, and had them sent to Winchester" where they were disassembled near Fort Collier, mounted onto special dollies and wagons, and hauled by 40-horse teams "down the Valley turnpike to the [Manassas Gap] railroad at Strasburg". Eventually almost all of the B&O locomotives and most of the railroad cars were taken to the Manassas Gap Railroad.

During the summer of 1861, the Manassas Gap Railroad became the first railroad in American history to move troops to a major battle. Brigadier General Stonewall Jackson's brigade marched from Winchester, Virginia, through Ashby Gap and boarded trains at the Piedmont Station at Delaplane, Virginia. From there they were transported to the O&A's Manassas Junction and debarked to join the fight at the First Battle of Manassas.

A Confederate hospital was built at Mt. Jackson, the end of the southern spur of the Manassas Gap Railroad, to tend to the wounded from Northern Virginia battlefields who were transported in the early part of the war by rail to the hospital. The hospital could accommodate 500 patients and was run by Dr. Andrew Russell Meem, a native of Mt. Jackson. Across from the hospital, directly in front of the railroad tracks, a Confederate cemetery was established.

==== 1862 ====
In the opening months of 1862 most of the Baltimore & Ohio rolling stock and rail ties that had been captured and stored in Winchester, with the help of W&P Railroaders, were evacuated and used in various other Confederate railroads, such as the Centreville Military Railroad.

Both the western portion of the Manassas Gap Railroad and the Winchester and Potomac Railroad were under Union control by the spring, and were going to be used to support Union operations in that area as part of a plan developed by Major General George B. McClellan. McClellan's plan was to connect the Manassas Gap Railroad and the W&P Railroad with a line between Winchester and Strasburg, creating a "complete circle of rails" from the Union capital at Washington, D.C., to the Shenandoah Valley by either the B&O or O&A.

On May 23, 1862, Colonel Turner Ashby and the 7th Virginia Cavalry, during the Valley Campaign of 1862, tore up rails in the direction of Strasburg, while Colonel Thomas T. Munford's 2nd Virginia Cavalry "wrecked track and bridges as far east as Thoroughfare Gap."

==== 1864 ====
The Battle of Tom's Brook on October 9, 1864 was fought in significant part directly upon the line of the Manassas Gap Railroad. The battle, part of Sheridan's 1864 Valley Campaign, was a decisive cavalry engagement, after which the Union finally achieved cavalry supremacy in the Shenandoah Valley.

=== Post Bellum ===
After the war ended in 1865, the B&O gained control of the O&A, and in 1867, the Manassas Gap Railroad as well, merging them to form the Orange, Alexandria and Manassas Railroad. The damaged portions of each were repaired, and new construction resumed up the Shenandoah Valley from Mt. Jackson, reaching Harrisonburg in 1868. (Tudor Hall was renamed Manassas and became an incorporated town in 1873).

The B&O also acquired or built track to connect its east-west main line at Harpers Ferry, West Virginia, with Winchester and Strasburg, and south past Harrisonburg to eventually reach Lexington. However, financial difficulties prevented the B&O from its ultimate goal of reaching Salem, where it could connect with the Virginia and Tennessee Railroad (V&T), which became part of William Mahone's Atlantic, Mississippi and Ohio Railroad (AM&O) in 1870. The AM&O extended about 400 miles (640 km) across the southern tier of Virginia from Norfolk, to Bristol.

In 1881, the B&O's plan to reach all the way south to Salem effectively became moot when the expanding Richmond and Danville Railroad took over the Virginia Midland Railroad, the successor to the O&A and Manassas Gap Railroads, which the B&O had acquired during the 1860s. Also in that year, the AM&O, in receivership since the mid-1870s, was acquired by Philadelphia-based interests competing with the B&O who also controlled the Shenandoah Valley Railroad, a parallel line also building up the Shenandoah Valley from the Potomac River which thereby achieved the connection with the original V&T near Salem the B&O had sought. At the junction, the new Norfolk and Western Railway turned a tiny flag stop named Big Lick into the new railroad city of Roanoke, Virginia, a few miles northeast of Salem.

== Modern times ==
In 1896, most of the original Manassas Gap Railroad became part of the Southern Railway system, which in 1982 became part of the Norfolk Southern Railway.

Between its intersection with Sudley Road (Virginia State Route 234 (Business)) northwest of Manassas and its termination at Interstate 81 west of Front Royal, Interstate 66 follows a route similar to that of the railroad, crossing the railroad twice. The railroad's route is also similar to that of Virginia State Route 55, which it crosses several times. The railroad and the two highways cross the Bull Run Mountains at Thoroughfare Gap, near the historic Beverley Mill and Broad Run.

The section of the original Manassas Gap Railroad between Strasburg and Manassas, Virginia continues to be used a busy freight line, called the B-Line of the Norfolk Southern railroad, with the heaviest traffic between Front Royal and Manassas. Since the 1999 breakup of Conrail, when Norfolk Southern acquired the Lurgan Branch from the north end of the Hagerstown District into Pennsylvania, the B-Line east of Front Royal has been a major connection, allowing traffic on the Washington District to bypass Washington, D.C.. The B-Line supports mainly intermodal and manifest trains, although beginning in late 2018, Norfolk Southern began running coal unit trains on it more frequently than before.

From Strasburg south, the original spur of the Manassas Gap Railroad to Mt. Jackson, Virginia, the line is out of service. The last train traveled north from Woodstock in 2007 and south from Mount Jackson in 2014. Having lost all local industrial customers, in 2016 this portion of the original Manassas Gap Railroad was put out of service by Norfolk Southern between Strasburg and Broadway, Virginia, roughly 38.5 miles. The Manassas Gap Railroad itself ended at Mt. Jackson, about 15 miles north of Broadway. However subsequent owners extended the line to Harrisonburg. Norfolk Southern announced that they were no longer going to maintain the track, and it is now overgrown with weeds and brush. Pending a formal abandonment of the portion of the line by the Norfolk Southern, there has been some initial discussion of turning the disused line into a rails-to-trails project. A regional group of public, private and non-profit organizations based in the counties of Shenandoah and Rockingham, Virginia have come together in an exploratory group called the Shenandoah Rail Trail Partnership to seek transformation of the rail corridor from Strasburg to Broadway into a multi-use trail.

In September 2023, the amended Virginia state budget allocated up to $35 million for the state to purchase 50 miles of right of way and bridges from Norfolk Southern.
