= Beverley Mill =

- U.S. National Register of Historic Places
- U.S. Historic district – Contributing property
- Virginia Landmarks Register
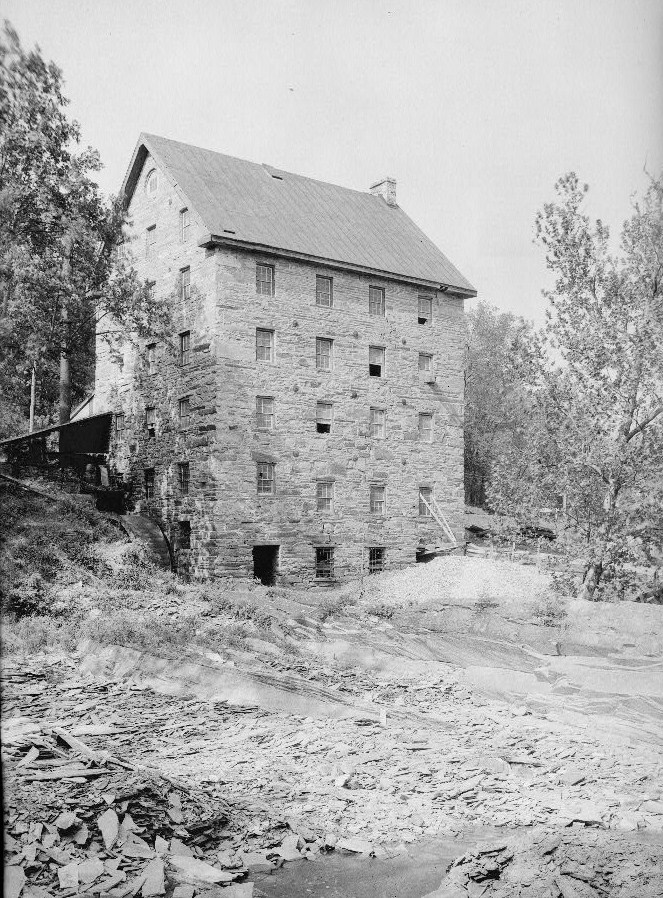
- Beverley's Mill, HABS Photo

- Location within Northern Virginia Location within Virginia Location within the United States
- Location: Junction of Virginia State Route 55 and Beverleys Mill Road, near Broad Run, Virginia
- Coordinates: 38°49′28″N 77°42′39″W
- Area: 9.9 acres (4.0 ha)
- Built: 1742
- Built by: Jonathan Chapman; Nathaniel Chapman
- Restored: 1858
- Restored by: John Chapman
- Part of: Broad Run-Little Georgetown Rural Historic District (ID16000205)
- NRHP reference No.: 72001411
- VLR No.: 076-0002

Significant dates
- Added to NRHP: February 23, 1972
- Designated CP: April 21, 2016
- Designated VLR: November 1, 1971

Beverley Mill, also known as Chapman's Mill or the Chapman-Beverley Mill, is a historic grist mill located north of Interstate 66 and Virginia State Route 55 in Thoroughfare Gap near Broad Run, Virginia, straddling the county line between Prince William and Fauquier Counties. It was built about 1759, and is a five-story, four bay by three bay, rubble stone structure. The water power was provided by Broad Run, which, in its 1,300-foot (400-metre) passage through the Gap, drops 87 feet (27 metres). Exterior mill machinery included a 29-foot (8.8-metre) metal waterwheel and sluice gate as well as a stone mill race. The mill continued in operation through World War II. It is included in the Thoroughfare Gap Battlefield and is currently the tallest stacked stone structure in the United States.

The mill was added to the National Register of Historic Places in 1972. On October 22, 1998, a fire resulting from vandalism gutted the mill, which is awaiting restoration.

== History ==
The mill was originally built in 1742 by Jonathan and Nathaniel Chapman and later enlarged in 1758. When originally built, it was fully contained within Prince William County, but it was used as a landmark when creating Fauquier County. Now, the mill is within both counties.

Chapman family records show that 45 individuals were enslaved on the farm adjoining the mill. A fire in 1858 damaged the mill, but it was rebuilt using slave labor and adding an additional two stories. John Chapman, the owner, desired to increase the capacity of the mill due to the recent installation of the nearby Manassas Gap Railroad.

The mill played a crucial role during the American Civil War. By 1861, the mill had become a meat curing and distribution center operated by the Confederates. The Confederates later burned the mill to prevent the Union from obtaining resources left in the mill. In 1862, the Battle of Thoroughfare Gap took place in and around the mill. Following John Chapman's death, the property was privately sold to Robert Beverley. The Beverley family restored the mill after the war by 1876.

The mill was sold several times throughout the late 19th and early 20th centuries, with Charles Furr Jr. purchasing the mill in 1903. Through the early 1940s, the mill annually produced approximately 100,000 bushels of grain and employed six individuals. Following renovations, the Furr family sold the mill to Walter Chrysler in 1945, who soon closed and sold the mill in 1951, due to the inability to comply with FDA regulations.

The mill initially became at risk in the 1960s, when the Virginia Department of Transportation was constructing Interstate 66 through the Thoroughfare Gap; however, efforts by private citizens helped reroute I-66 around the mill. The mill was then sold in 1973 to Bull Run Preserve, Inc, with the intention of restoring the property, but restoration efforts had ceased by 1981, and the mill was boarded to prevent vandalism.

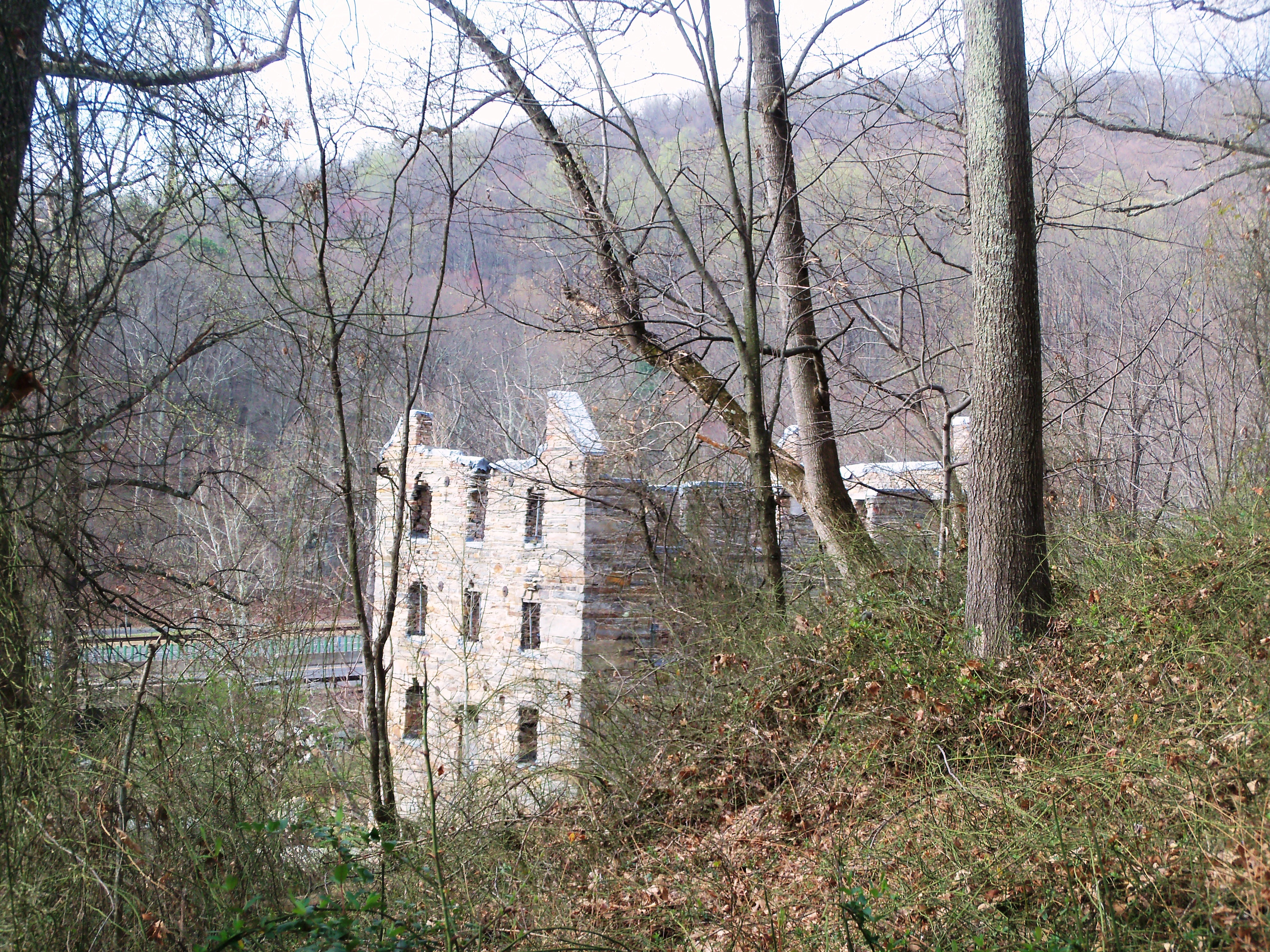
The mill ruins in 2013.

The mill was heavily damaged by arson in 1998, resulting in the roof, internal mechanics, and flooring being destroyed. The mill is currently owned by the Turn the Mill Around Campaign, a 501(c)(3) tax-exempt foundation with the goal of restoring and reopening the mill for public access.

== See also ==
- National Register of Historic Places listings in Prince William County, Virginia
- National Register of Historic Places listings in Fauquier County, Virginia
