= Thorough (disambiguation) =

Thorough may refer to:

- Thorough (policy) of Laud and Wentworth in England and Ireland in the 1630s
- Thorough Guides, late-Victorian travel guides
- HMS Thorough (P324), British submarine 1942–62
- Thorough-bass, a kind of musical notation in which numerals and symbols indicate intervals, chords, and non-chord tones, in relation to the bass note they are placed above or below.
- Efficiency–thoroughness trade-off principle

== See also ==
- Thoroughbred (disambiguation)
- Thoroughfare (disambiguation)
- Thoroughwort, genus Eupatorium of flowering plants in the aster family
- Thoroughly Modern Millie, 1967 musical
