= Thoroughfare (disambiguation) =

A thoroughfare is a road or way for travel between places

Thoroughfare may also refer to:

== Places ==
- Thoroughfare, New Jersey, United States
- Thoroughfare, Newfoundland and Labrador, Canada
- Thoroughfare, Virginia, United States
- Thoroughfare Gap (Bull Run Mountain), a water gap in the Bull Run Mountains
  - Thoroughfare Gap Battlefield, an American Civil War battlefield in the gap
- Central Arc Thoroughfare, is a semicircular chain of streets in Saint Petersburg, Russia
- Łazienkowska Thoroughfare, a road in Warsaw, Poland

== See also ==
- No Thoroughfare
- Thoroughfare Gap
