= Jackson's operations against the B&O Railroad (1861) =

Confederate military attack on Union logistics

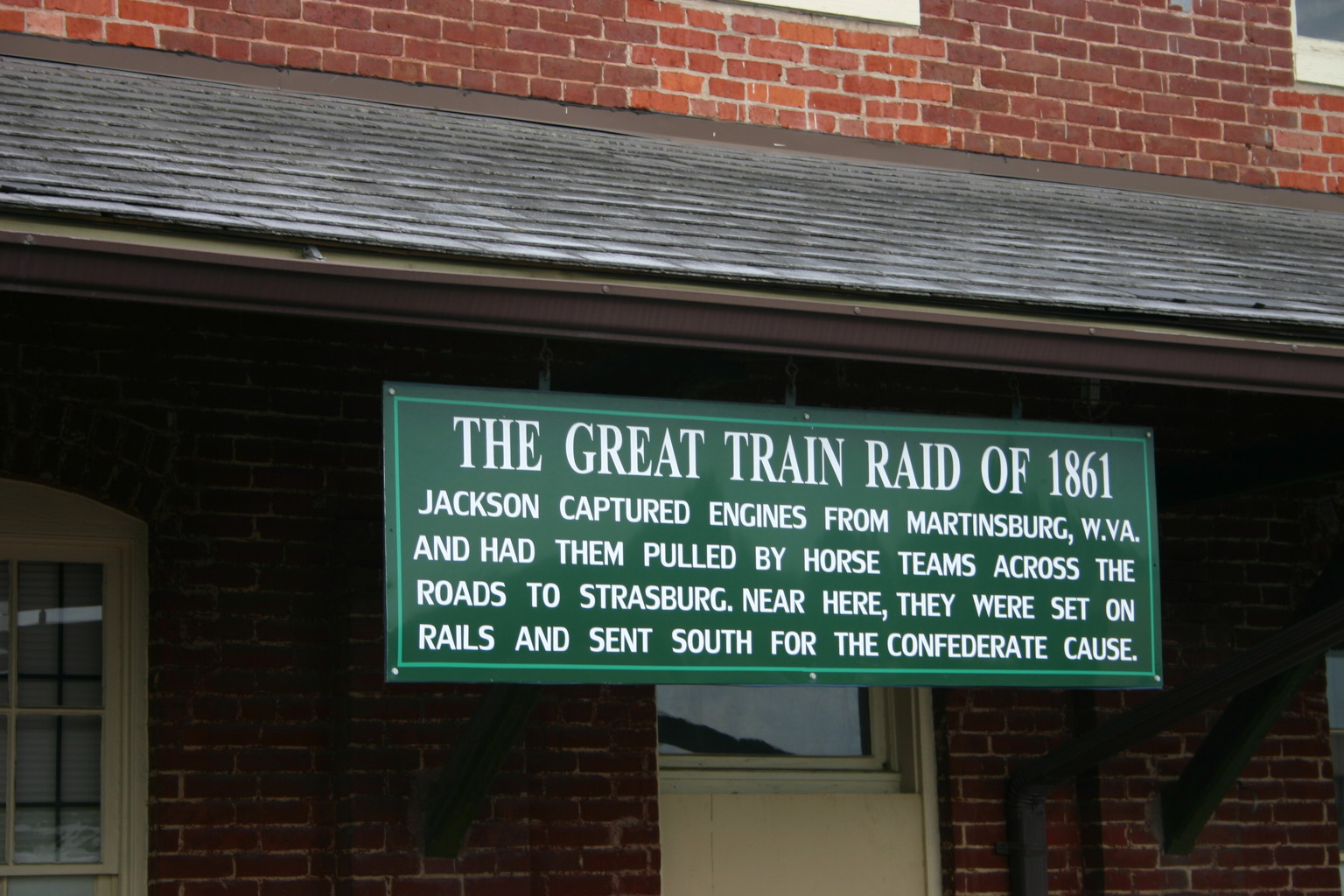
The Great Train Raid of 1861 sign at the historic train depot in Strasburg, Virginia, where between 14 and 19 locomotives were brought over the Valley Pike from Martinsburg, West Virginia, and Winchester, Virginia.

Colonel Stonewall Jackson's operations against the Baltimore and Ohio Railroad in 1861 were aimed at disrupting the critical railroad used heavily by the opposing Union Army as a major supply route. A second goal was to capture the maximum number of locomotives and cars for use in the Confederate States of America. During this point in the war, the state of Maryland's stance was not yet determined. The B&O Railroad, then owned by the state of Maryland, ran through Maryland and along the Potomac River Valley in its pass through the Appalachian Mountains, but took a crucial turn at Harpers Ferry and passed south, through Virginia and Martinsburg while crossing the Shenandoah Valley. The railroad then continued on through much of present-day West Virginia, which then was still part of Virginia, meaning that a major portion of the route went through a state which later seceded.

Many historians have written that the operations began when the Virginia militia launched a raid in western Virginia at the end of busy noontime traffic on May 23, 1861, "the eve of Virginia's ratification of her secession ordinance", during the early days of the American Civil War. Historian James I. Robertson Jr. contests this version of events, saying that such a raid never occurred and that the story grew out of an unreliable 1885 account of the events by General John D. Imboden.

In any event, from late May through June Confederate forces controlled the railroad and destroyed track and bridges throughout the Virginia portion of the railroad. Believing that Harper's Ferry was indefensible against a Union advance, General Joseph E. Johnston was given permission to abandon the post. As part of this retreat, a major bridge was destroyed at Harper's Ferry and the railroad works at Martinsburg were destroyed. In a major engineering feat, 14 locomotives from Martinsburg were disassembled and moved across country by horse drawn teams to Strasburg, Virginia. Eventually, the locomotives were moved to Richmond where they were put to use by the Confederacy.

== Background ==
=== Virginia Militia forces deploy and defend Harpers Ferry ===
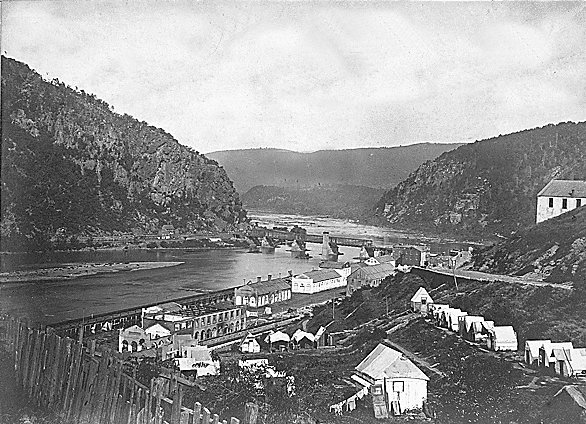
Photo of Virginia Militia raid base at Harpers Ferry taken later in 1865, looking east (downstream)

After the Virginia Secession Convention reconvened and voted on April 17, provisionally, to secede, on the condition of a future ratification by a statewide referendum, the Governor of Virginia immediately began mobilizing the Virginia State Militia to strategic points around the state, including the assignment of Colonel Kenton Harper to Virginia's "Forces In and About Harper's Ferry, Virginia" on April 18.

Hours before Virginia Militia forces from Charlestown, West Virginia, and Winchester, Virginia, arrived on April 18, the Federal troops guarding the arsenal evacuated and burned it. Nine days later, on 27 April, Colonel Thomas J. (later "Stonewall") Jackson, then of the Virginia State Militia, was ordered to relieve Colonel Harper. He began the task of organizing the defense of Virginia at that location. During his first day commanding forces, on April 27, 1861, Colonel Jackson's men arrested one of the only four general officers in the regular army at that time, Brigadier General William Selby Harney, at Harpers Ferry, while he was taking a train to Washington, D.C. He was commanding the Department of the West, and was traveling from his headquarters in St. Louis, Missouri. Sometime following this, Colonel Jackson, while familiarizing himself with the B&O Railroad line, inspected Captain John D. Imboden's (later a CSA Brigadier General) assigned post, possessing the bridge across the Potomac River at Point of Rocks, Maryland.

=== Tensions build in May 1861 ===
For the immediate time being, "B&O trains continued to run, with many interruptions and only with the consent of Virginia." Colonel Jackson realized that Harper's Ferry held not only important arms production factories, but was a choke-hold on the Baltimore and Ohio Railroad, the Chesapeake and Ohio Canal, and key telegraph trunk lines connecting Baltimore, Maryland and Washington, D.C. to the Ohio Valley and interior of the United States. As the war approached, the president of the B&O Railroad, John W. Garrett, who was sympathetic to the Union, became "outspoken" against the Confederacy, using "some strong adjectives to lend stress" to the word "rebel". Delagrange notes "As war seemed to be approaching, B&O President John Garrett tried to appear neutral (his sympathies were with the North), a good business practice because people weren't certain if Maryland would go Union or, even if it did, whether the line could be kept from the Confederates. Also, West Virginia had not separated from Virginia yet, so technically most of the B&O tracks lay in the South."

On May 5, 1861, Federal forces seized control of the B&O Relay House nine miles (14 km) west of Baltimore, so that Brigadier General B. F. Butler could "inspect and stop any further freight headed for military forces of Virginia." Butler was eager to assume authority in the absence of official instructions and finally occupied all of Baltimore on May 13, shortly before his promotion to Major General on May 16. He "started to arrest citizens known for their open Confederate support" including "Ross Winans, long-time inventor and locomotive builder." Political instability began to mount, as martial law was declared in Baltimore, which was a very secession-sympathetic city.

== May 23, 1861 Raid ==
The events as described in this section are contested in the "Raid controversy" section below.

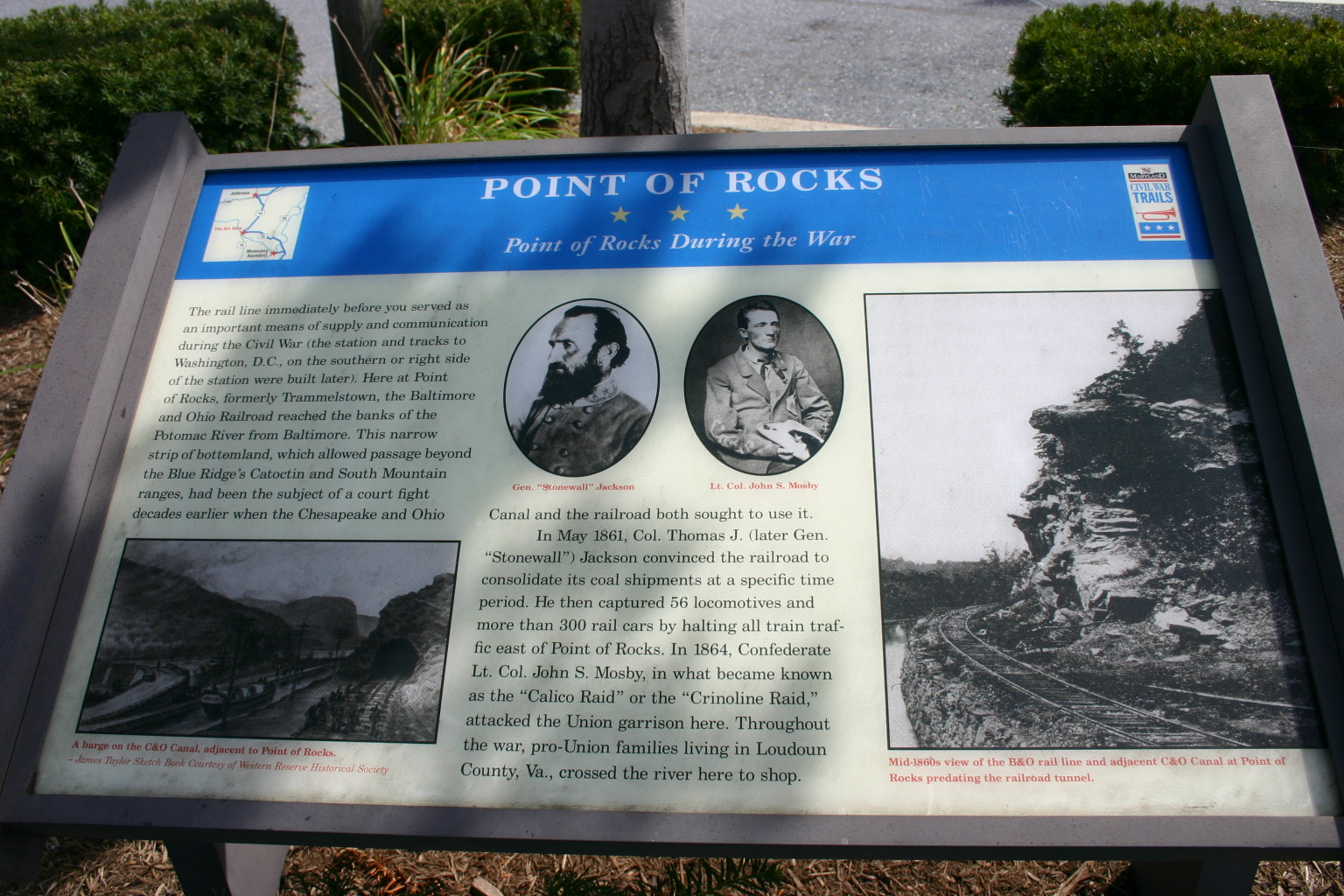
Sign at Point of Rocks mentioning May 1861 raid

Colonel Jackson, gathering intelligence on freight passing on the line, determined that coal was being shipped in large quantities from the Ohio Valley to Union naval bases in Baltimore that were fueling U.S. Navy warships attempting to blockade the more southern states. "During early May, dozens of heavy coal and freight trains were moving daily over the double-track line in the Harpers Ferry area."

About the middle of May Jackson then devised a covert plan to destroy B&O Railroad operations while simultaneously benefiting Virginia and possibly the Confederacy. Jackson complained to the B&O Railroad that the "noisy night railroad traffic" of the trains disturbed the rest of his troops, and notified John Garrett that trains would only be allowed to pass through Harpers Ferry at first only during daylight hours, but within a few days demanded a tighter timetable restriction between the hours of 11 a.m. and 1 p.m. in order to ensure their rest was not disturbed. Delagrange notes "He complained strongly that the trains were disturbing the rest of his tired troops at Harper's Ferry. Garrett agreed to run as many trains as possible through around noon." Thus only two hours in the day, centered around noon, were allowed for train traffic through the Harpers Ferry area after the middle of May. This timetable bottleneck caused the B&O Railroad to pile up trains in yards and along the lines on the double tracks on either side of Harpers Ferry in order to maximize their throughput during this new curfew.

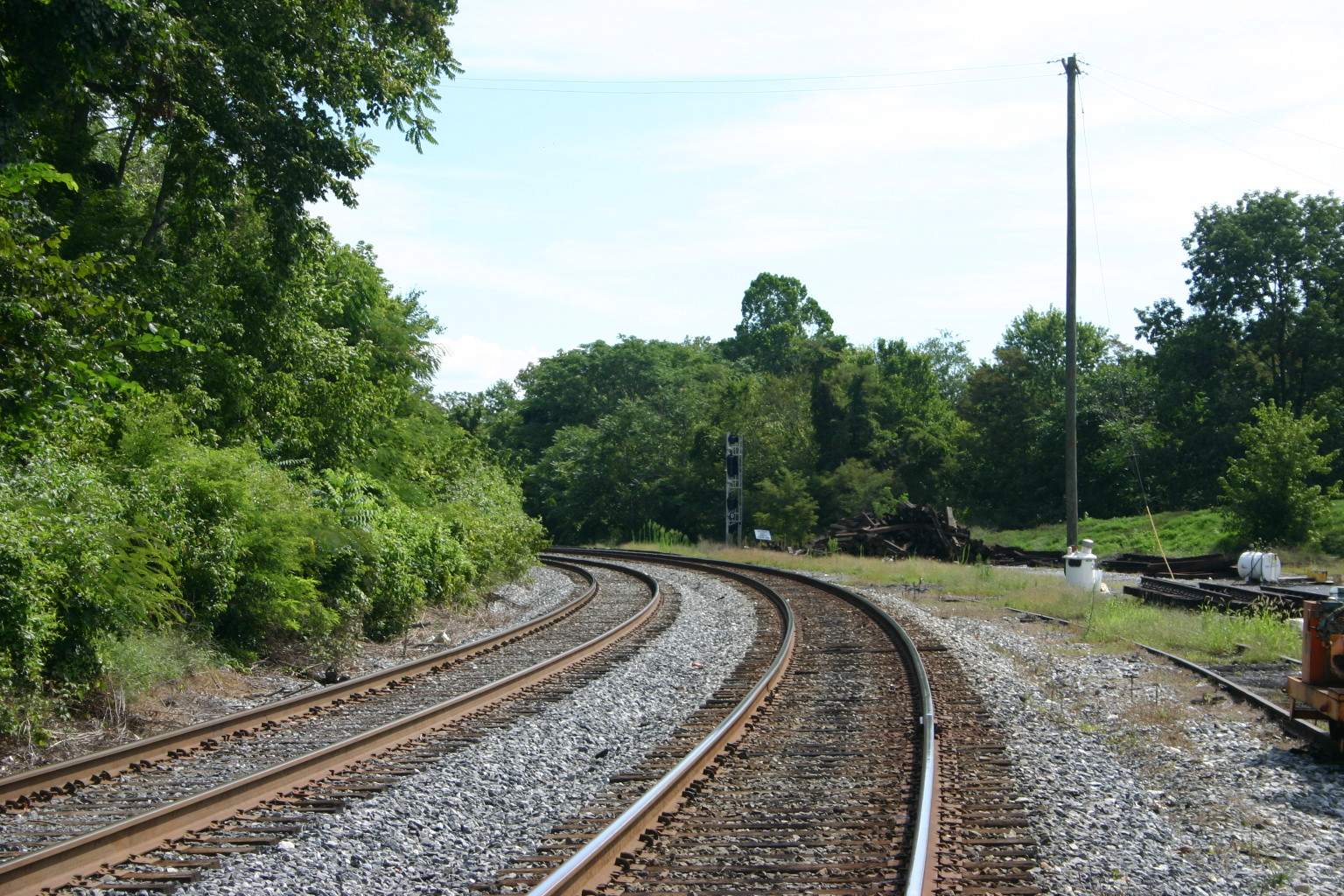
The Point of Rocks signal tower (2008), location of Colonel Imboden's cavalry raid to cut the B&O rail line

On the night of May 22, Jackson sent the 5th Virginia Infantry under Kenton Harper to Cherry Run, west of Martinsburg, and he sent Captain John D. Imboden's cavalry to Point of Rocks, east of Harpers Ferry. The 5th Virginia positioned themselves at a bridge spanning the Potomac River near Cherry Run, thirty-two miles west of Harpers Ferry on the Potomac River north and west of the Baltimore and Ohio Railroad Martinsburg Shops. Imboden's cavalry staged themselves at the signal tower west of Point of Rocks, twelve miles (19 km) east of Harpers Ferry.

The following morning, May 23, the trains waiting to the east and west of this forty-four mile section "arrived on schedule" and began moving across this curfewed span at 11:00 a.m. "freely entering the zone for an hour after eleven o'clock." This one-hour period allowed for just enough time for these trains to make it only part way into their forty-four mile stretch without reaching the other end on the doubled-up tracks of that main stem section. Then, "at the end of the busy noontime traffic," just as all these trains had filled up the east and westbound lanes, practically coupler to coupler, "Imboden and Harper suddenly halted traffic at midday" by emerging forth and not allowing the trains now coming toward each of their positions to pass and get out of this double-track stretch. Thus Colonel Jackson had now "bagged" the "largest single haul of rolling stock taken intact during the war" on the very first day of the war from Virginia's perspective: May 23, 1861.

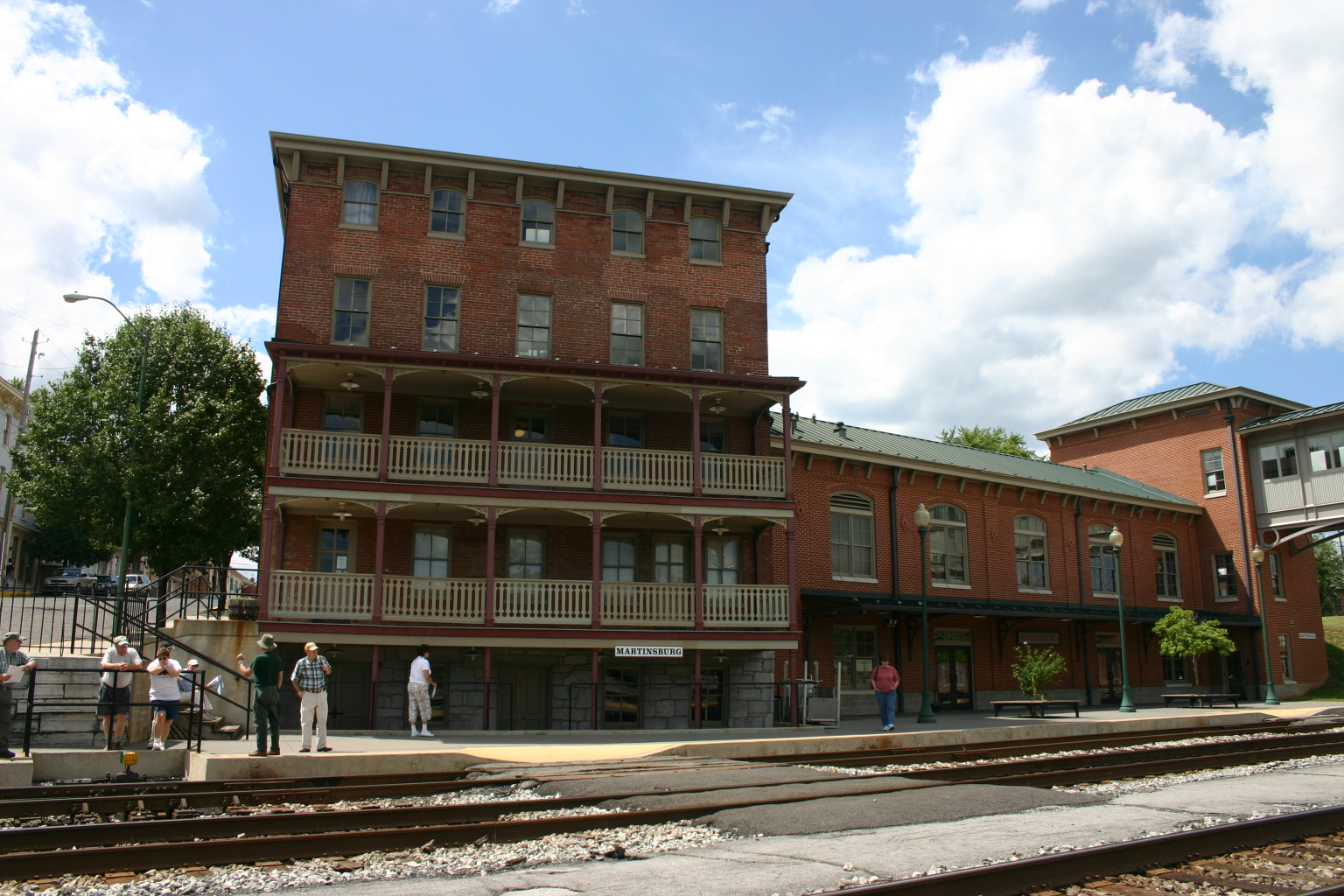
Historic Martinsburg railyard (2008) where over 56 locomotives and trains were captured by Stonewall Jackson

The B&O Railroad's main stem now filled with "dozens of wrathy, impatient locomotive engineers wondering what was causing the tie up." Locomotives and trains were caught in various places all along this section, and this trapped a large quantity of rolling stock in between, which "was soon concentrated in the big rail yard at Martinsburg, West Virginia." From Harpers Ferry, the Winchester and Potomac Railroad ran as a spur off the B&O Railroad mainline south to Winchester, Virginia, allowing Jackson an opportunity to try and move his captured rail assets quickly to Winchester. The entire forty-four mile railline between Cherry Run and Harper's Ferry, with the huge railyard at Martinsburg, and the thirty-two mile Winchester spur was now entirely isolated as a whole and separate system of seventy-six miles of railroad, apart from the western and eastern runs of the main B&O Railroad stem.

== Hauling away the bounty ==
B&O locomotives captured during the Great Train Raid of 1861
Engine	Type
No. 17	Norris 4–2–0
No. 34	Mason 4–4–0
No. 187	Camelback 0–8–0
No. 188 (CSA name "Lady Davis")	Tyson 4-4-0 "Dutch Wagon"
No. 193	Camelback 0–8–0
No. 198	Hayes Camelback 0–8–0
No. 199	Camelback 0–8–0
No. 201	?

=== Initial capture ===
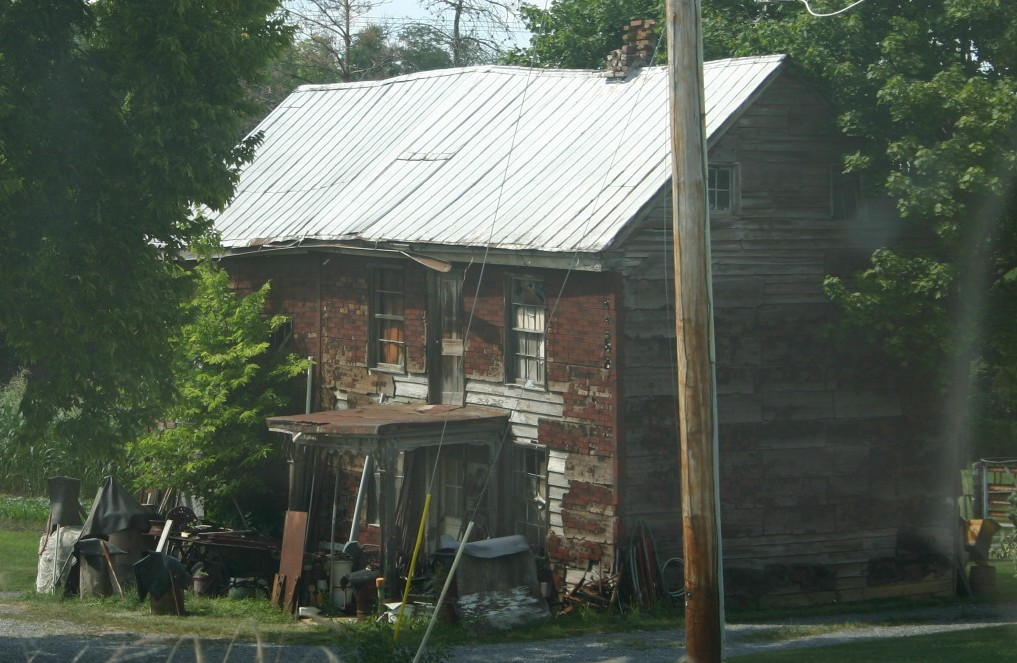
Homestead of wagoneer Joseph Keeler off Old Charles Town Road near Stephenson, Virginia, who was contracted to build all the wagons and dollies which hauled the 14 locomotives from Martinsburg and Winchester, and the two locomotives taken at Leesburg, Virginia

Sources disagree on both the number of locomotives and railroad cars captured and the dates that the captures occurred. Historian Edward Hungerford, in his centennial history of the B&O Railroad published in 1928, describes the May capture as follows:

Upon an appointed day in that month of May, he held up all trains moving through Harpers Ferry and helped himself to four small locomotives; which were not too heavy to go safely over the poorly built branch line to Winchester, thirty miles away. These engines, once obtained, were hauled by horses over the famous Valley Turnpike to Strasburg, but twenty miles (32 km) from Winchester, where they were placed on rails -- on the track of the Manassas Gap Railway, which connected with the Virginia Central and the entire railroad system of the Confederacy.

Hungerford writes,

This was real strategy and Jackson undoubtedly would have repeated it, had it not been that Harper's Ferry was beginning to be untenable for him." After the evacuation of Harper's Ferry, beginning on June 20, Jackson fell back to Martinsburg and "forty-two locomotives and their tenders at that important railroad center, in addition to 305 cars, chiefly coal gondolas, were given the torch.

Railroad historian Thomas Weber presents a different scenario regarding the dates and the events culminating in the capture of significant rail stock. Weber does not mention the May 23 raid but does state that on May 28 Confederate forces occupied 100 miles (160 km) of the B&O line. Jackson, reluctant to antagonize Confederate sympathizers in the area, continued to allow the trains to move through the entire area for another two weeks until June 13 when Jackson was ordered to abandon Harper's Ferry. This is when Jackson, according to Weber, decided to "spring the trap" by blocking any trains from leaving a 54-mile (87 km) stretch of track after they were allowed, from either end, to enter. This resulted in a large capture of locomotives and cars.

=== Closure of the railroad ===
Historian Angus James Johnston, II, "To make sure the trains stayed trapped and to prevent Union armies under George B. McClellan and Robert Patterson from using the road, the Confederates [still officially Virginia Militia] began destroying bridges and track on May 25," taking down seventeen bridges over the next thirty-day period. The main stem of the B&O which ran mostly in or near Virginia was severed and cut off from the rest of the line by blasting a "massive rock formation onto the track at Point of Rocks." Johnston made the determination that in fact no rail traffic passed the B&O main stem west of Point of Rocks after the end of May, and west of Opequon Creek Bridge two miles (3.2 km) east of Martinsburg after June 2.

On June 2, 1861, due to a combination of miscommunications and over-zealousness, Confederate forces continued destroying B&O Railroad assets, including the B&O Railroad bridge over Opequon Creek two miles (3.2 km) east of Martinsburg. Here they lit 50 coal cars on fire and ran them off the destroyed trestle, "where they burned for two months, the intense heat melting axles and wheels." The 52 remaining locomotives and various rail cars left in Martinsburg were thus left stranded by this uncoordinated action, and this ended the ability to move the remaining locomotives "by rail to the south". "This destruction was carried out in accordance with Lee's order of May 6 to Jackson to destroy the railroad bridges in order to frustrate the Union armies then advancing upon Harper's Ferry", says Johnston referencing Official Records, II, 806.

Historian John F. Stover notes that John W. Garrett, President of the B&O Railroad acknowledged that by May 28 the Virginia forces (called Confederate by Garrett) had taken control of 100 miles (160 km) of the main stem from Point of Rocks westward. However, Stover indicates that the destruction of the railroad did not begin until "early June", culminating in the destruction of the "800-foot combined highway-railroad bridge at Harpers Ferry" on June 14. Stover writes, "With this dramatic action, the main line of the B&O was to be effectively closed down for nearly ten months."

Historian Thomas Weber also indicates that the trains continued to run from May 28 for another 17 days until June 14, and gives his account of the raid by Jackson as occurring coincidentally with his view of a June 14 shutdown:

For some time after May 28, Jackson allowed all trains to run back and forth, probably because he was trying to win as many Confederate sympathizers in the area as he could, and hence did not want to indulge in too much property destruction. For more than two weeks, B & O East-West trains were literally run through the lines of both armies.

William Prescott Smith, master of transportation for the railroad and the "good man Friday" to Garrett, who notes that at least through June 2 the railroad was still operating through the Virginia stretch:

I have to advise you that the Southern forces at Harper's Ferry took the Mail matter from our Mail train, bound east from Wheeling for Baltimore, during the night. This is the first instance, as far as my reports advise, wherein the mail has been disturbed at any point of our lines ... Another bridge upon our line was destroyed at nine o'clock this morning, near Martinsburg, but as four of those previously destroyed have been restored already, and as we are determined to continue to working the road to fullest extent wherever it is all safe to do so, we hope the Department will understand that we are not disposed to suspend our operations for any cause whatever that we can possibly control.

== Secession and retreat from Harper's Ferry ==
On May 23, the Commonwealth of Virginia conducted its popular vote, and secession was formally ratified. Immediately Major-General Joseph E. Johnston, then of the Virginia State Militia, relieved Colonel Jackson and took command at Harpers Ferry on May 24. Shortly afterward, on June 8, all Virginia State troops were transferred to the authority of the Confederate States.

=== Jackson moves to Martinsburg ===
The Virginia legislature had ratified the Confederate constitution on May 2, and General Joseph Johnston had been given the Confederate command over the area covering Harper's Ferry. Johnston arrived in Harper's Ferry on the afternoon of the 23rd and informed Jackson of the change. From the beginning Johnston felt that Harper's Ferry was indefensible, and he soon began pleading his case with Richmond. On June 13, in a telegram from Adjutant General Samuel Cooper, Johnston was authorized, if he felt the enemy "is about to turn [his] position", to "destroy everything at Harper's Ferry" and "retire upon the railroad towards Winchester."

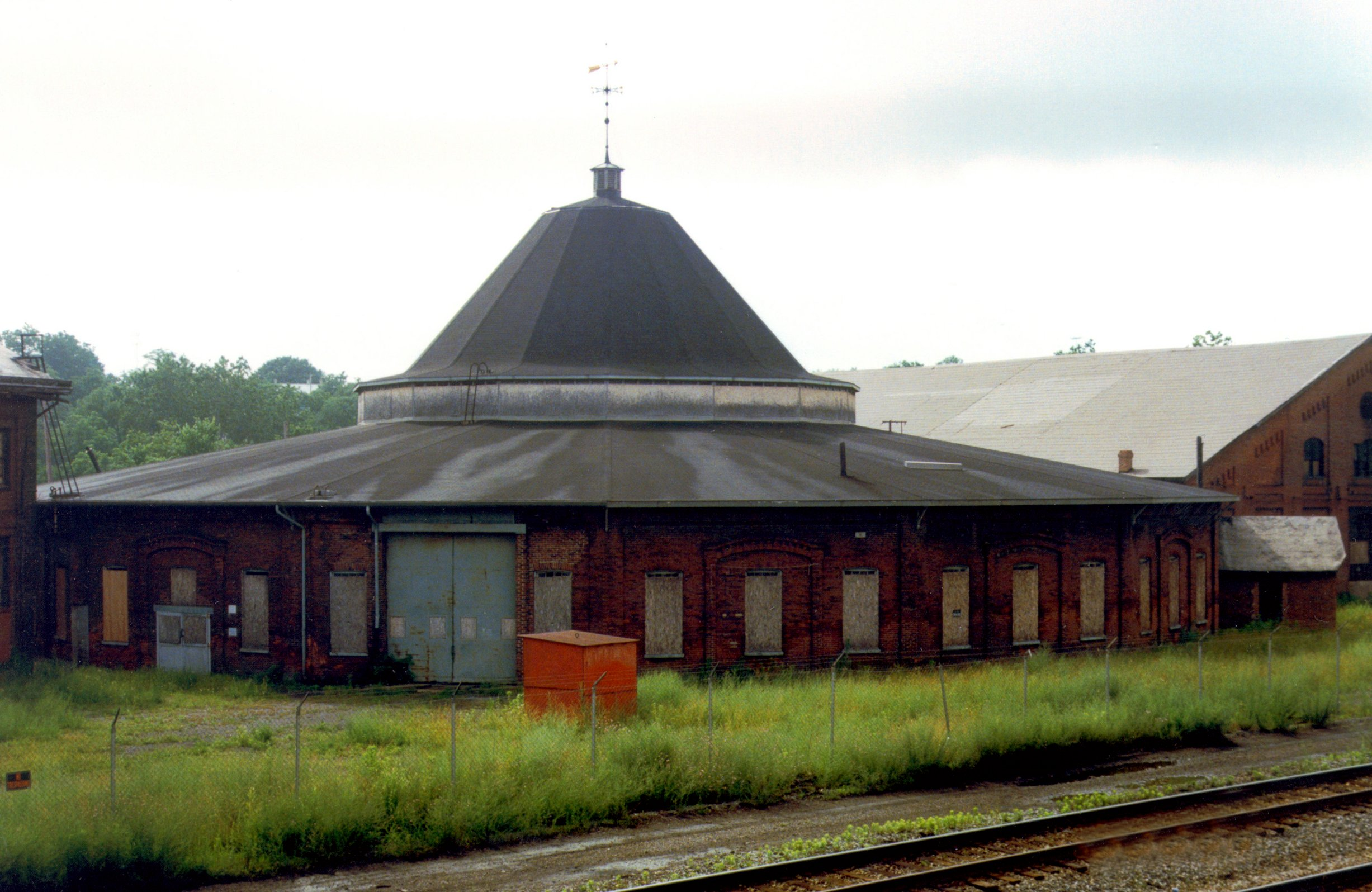
B&O Roundhouse where Colonel Jackson burned the original on June 23, 1861, Martinsburg, West Virginia

On June 19, while Johnston and Jackson were on the road, Colonel "Jeb" Stuart was in Martinsburg, twenty miles (32 km) north of Winchester, and Johnston was concerned that Union troops might be advancing towards Martinsburg. Johnston ordered Jackson to join Stuart and destroy the important B&O railroad shops before they fell into Union hands. Jackson arrived in Martinsburg on the afternoon of June 20. Robertson wrote:

Pursuant to orders, but against his better judgment that railroad equipment should always be saved, Jackson began a systematic destruction of the Martinsburg yards. Details ripped up track and burned cross-ties; other groups of soldiers set fire to the round houses and machine shops. Some fifty-six locomotives and tenders, as well as at least 305 coal cars, were either set afire, heaved into the Opequon river, or dismantled to the point of uselessness.

Jackson was conflicted over supervising the destruction of material badly needed by the Confederacy. Within a few days Jackson worked out a plan with the assistance of two railroad employees, Hugh Longust and Thomas R. Sharp, to select the 13 least damaged locomotives, dismantle the engines, and transport overland by forty-horse teams the 38 miles (61 km) to Strasburg.

At Martinsburg, as Jackson proceeded with this "wreckage", he started to have doubts as "word [came] from his beloved Southland of the desperate need of locomotives." He noted that "some of these Baltimore and Ohio engines had not been so very badly burned; after all, there is very little about a locomotive that can ever be destroyed by fire.". Hungerford writes:

Slowly a great idea formulated itself within his mind. If only some of the best of the locomotives could be moved down upon those Southern railways. ... Over the turnpike; as he had done with the little Harpers Ferry engines, from Winchester to Strasburg. True it was that the distance from Martinsburg through Winchester to Strasburg (thirty-eight miles) was considerably longer, but the highway was good and the thing was possible. At any rate, one bright morning in July, he arranged to take the first of the engines out over the turnpike. A picked group of about thirty-five men, including six machinists, ten teamsters and about a dozen laborers, had been told of the task. They were placed under the immediate charge of Hugh Longust, an experienced and veteran railroader from Richmond. Longhust reported in turn to Colonel Thomas R. Sharp, at that time ranked as captain and also as acting quartermaster-general in the Confederate Army.

Hungerford states that "In this way, fourteen Baltimore and Ohio engines, of every sort and variety, 'made the Gap' that summer of '61."

Jackson's plan was to move these assets down the Winchester and Potomac Railroad via Harpers Ferry to Winchester, disassemble them and mount them on special wagons, and move them overland to Strasburg, Virginia, where they were to be reassembled and moved south on the Manassas Gap Railroad. With the assistance of the chief engineer of the Winchester and Potomac Railroad, Thomas R. Sharp, Hugh Longust, an experienced railroad engineer from Richmond, Virginia, and Joseph Keeler and his son Charles Keeler—wagoneers living near Stephenson's Depot—special carriages and dollies were constructed and used to transport the first four small locomotives south from Winchester along the Valley Turnpike to Strasburg and then to Richmond via the Manassas Gap Railroad. In an incredible and historic feat of engineering, the Virginia militia soldiers pulled the first four locomotives with 40-horse teams, rigged artillery-style, through downtown Winchester south on the Valley Pike to the rail-head at Strasburg. "Colonel Jackson helped himself to four small locomotives not too heavy for the flimsy flat-bar rails of the Winchester & Potomac [Railroad], and had them sent to Winchester whence they were dragged down the Valley turnpike to the nearest railroad at Strasburg", says historian Johnston.

July 20, 1861 Harper's Weekly News Illustration: Camel back locomotive which had been left on the north end of the Winchester & Potomac Railroad

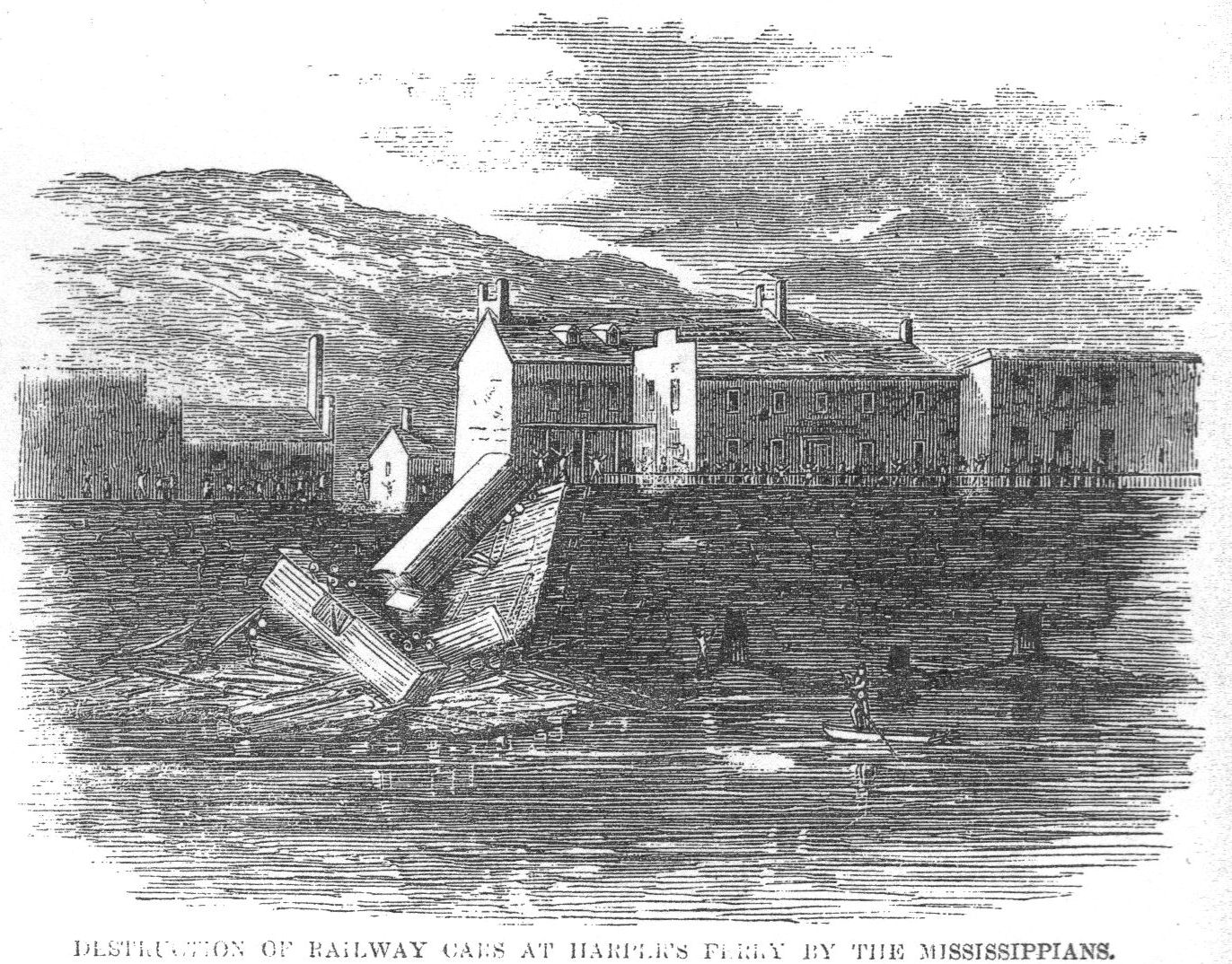
July 20, 1861 Harper's Weekly News Illustration:Rail cars destroyed by Mississipans at Harper's Ferry

"Locomotives Dismantled By the Rebels at Martinsburg, Virginia" in August 1861 Harpers Weekly

=== Remaining engines hauled all summer to Strasburg ===
In the weeks following this, Jackson decided to salvage ten of the burnt locomotives at Martinsburg and move them into the Confederate rail system. The evacuation of any more locomotives or rail cars by the Manassas Gap Railroad became too risky for potential re-capture by Union forces, and so those ten locomotives and additional rail cars were moved by the same carriage and dolly method 125 miles (201 km) south from Martinsburg through Winchester and on to the Virginia Central Railroad in Staunton, Virginia.

Robert C. Black has yet a different view. He notes that "nine miles of rail" plus "five well-furbished [not burnt] steam locomotives, plus $40,000 worth (U.S.) of machine tools and other materials [were] removed from the Martinsburg shops." The five locomotives presented a "strange procession" that "could be seen moving down the famous Valley Pike" as they "were dragged painfully southward behind multiple teams of horses. Under the direction of Thomas R. Sharp ... the locomotives arrived safely in Strasburg early in September, where they were hoisted onto Confederate rails." Black also mentions the little-known Leesburg raid in August, 1862 when "Just before the Alexandria, Loudoun & Hampshire had been swallowed up within the Federal lines, two of its engines had been laboriously salvaged and, appropriately rechristened the General Beauregard and the General Johnston".

==== 80 rail cars moved by end of July ====
Many of the rail cars that had been captured were hidden in barns and farms throughout the Winchester area, and Confederate forces along with citizens continued to move these up the valley through the summer months of 1861, and for a period of the next two years. By the 25th of July, Captain Thomas Sharp reported that 80 cars had been successfully moved on to Confederate rails

==== Eyewitness Julia Chase ====
One of the pro-Union Winchester diarists, Julia Chase gave the following eyewitness accounts of "secesh" activities concerning these 10 locomotives:

Sept. 2nd. [1861] Weather quite warm again. One of the Engines that was thrown in the river at Martinsburg, when the Confederate Army was at Harper's Ferry, has been brought into town today by 32 horses, to be taken on to Richmond. It was quite a sight as it passed by – looking very much like an iron monster.

Sept. 16th. [1861] Another of the Engines was brought from Martinsburg today, besides other things on Saturday. It is said that the reason the U. S. Government does not interfere in this case is because the leading Managers of the Balto & Ohio Railroad are Secessionists and they let them do as they please.

— pro-Unionist Winchester diarist, Julia Chase

and notes that things had been "thrown in the river at Martinsburg" in reference to the destruction of the Opequon Creek B&ORR bridge. Several historians note that the actual quantities of horse involved in pulling any one locomotive varied between 32 and 40.

As late as 1863 many of the railroad cars were still being hauled away up the Shenandoah Valley to Staunton for service on Confederate rail lines all throughout the South.

==== Final locomotive moved to Staunton ====
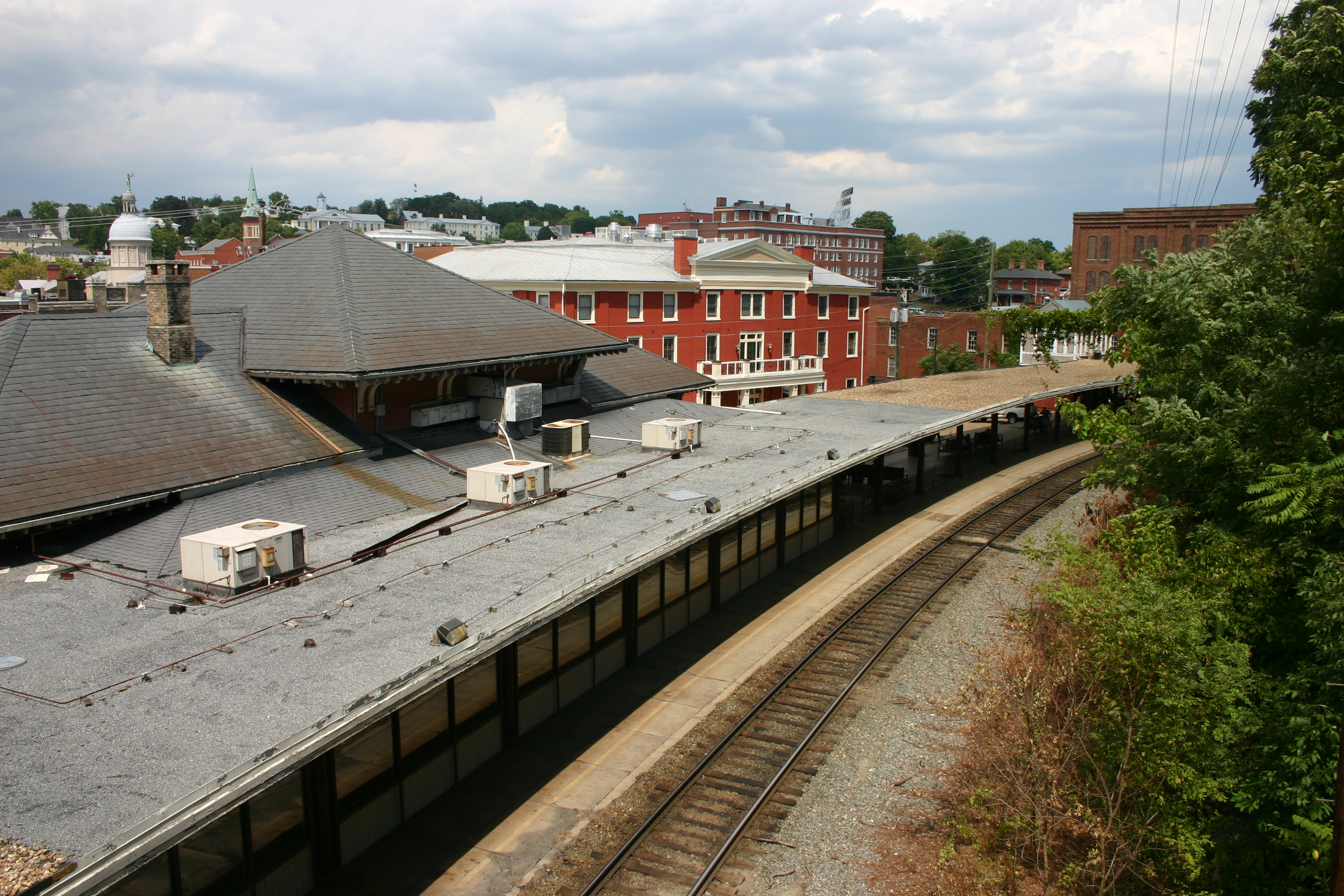
Staunton, Virginia Railroad Station, final destination of several locomotives taken further south to avoid Manassas Gap Railroad risks

Eyewitnesses living along the Valley turnpike witnessed some locomotives being moved all the way to Staunton, Virginia about the same time that General Johnston was evacuating Manassas in the spring of 1862. Mounting any more of the locomotives at Strasburg for evacuation on the Manassas Gap Railroad had become too risky. The last time that Captain Sharps "railroad corps" moved any of the captured locomotives was when the last of the engines to have been taken from Martinsburg to Strasburg was stranded by Johnston's evacuation. The same night of the evacuation, the B&O camelback Engine number 199 was put on the Manassas Gap Railroad tracks at Strasburg and moved south 25 miles (40 km) up the Shenandoah Valley to the very end of the line at Mount Jackson, Virginia. From there it was remounted onto the teamsters heavy duty wagon trucks and hauled overland on the Valley Turnpike again another 70 miles (110 km) to Staunton. The trip took four days, and when Engine 199 reached Staunton early in the morning, a majority of the towns population turned out to witness the incredible sight.

== Aftermath ==
=== Creation of the Confederate States Locomotive Works ===
All of the locomotives were collected at Richmond, Virginia until the last one had arrived. The threat imposed on Richmond by Major General McClellan's advance up the Peninsula in May 1862 caused Captain Sharp to direct the movement of the locomotives further south to Allamance County, North Carolina, about fifty miles west of Raleigh, North Carolina. Here the large shop buildings of the Raleigh and Gaston Railroad were leased, much of the Martinsburg shop equipment installed, and the "Confederate States locomotive shops" were established and began operating, first to refit and repair the locomotives.

=== B&O Railroad eventually reopens ===
During the early portions of the summer of 1861, Major General McClellan was able to gain control of the B&O RR northwest of Grafton, West Virginia and occasionally the B&O would push work crews in to restore and repair portions of the main stem, having considerable bridge repairs to perform. The repair languished, however, and the plight of the B&O "was sufficient to make many recall that the problems of the B&O were helping increase the profits of the Pennsylvania Railroad and the Northern Central, in which [the Secretary of War] Cameron had a major interest."

The total amount of repair work facing the B&O was extraordinary, including 26 bridges (127 spans with a total length of 4,713 feet), 102 miles (164 km) of telegraph line and a pair of water stations. "This was in addition to all the rolling stock lost and burnt at Martinsburg."

This initial long term service outage and blow to the B&O Railroad and Union effort finally received more attention from the War Department under Stanton, who placed more interest in restoring the line. By early March 1862 Major General McClellan's advance on the Peninsula was bringing pressure on the Confederate Army of the Potomac to pull back from Centreville, Virginia, who just happened to be using six miles (9.7 km) of the B&O's rail bars that had been seized in this raid and stored in Winchester, Virginia. The Great Train Raid bounty had supplied the Confederate Army with the materials to build the Centreville Military Railroad, where Captain Sharp was once again managing much of the effort. After Centreville was abandoned and the lower Shenandoah Valley was left lightly defended, the B&O Railroad came under Federal control, and B&O work crews were able to repair bridges and lay track during the entire month of March. A new wooden bridge at Harpers Ferry was built on a rushed accelerated schedule and the B&O Railroad officially reopened for service on March 30, 1862, and once again the transportation path from Baltimore to Ohio was finally clear, after ten full months of closure.

In his Annual Report of the B&O Railroad for 1861, President Garrett wrote:

On May 28, 1861, general possession was taken by the Confederate forces of more than one hundred miles of the Main Stem, embroiling chiefly the region between Point of Rocks and Cumberland. Occasional movements were also made, accompanied by considerable destruction upon the roads between Cumberland and Wheeling, and Grafton and Parkersburg, during the fiscal year. The Protection of the Government was not restored throughout the line until March, 1862, when the reconstruction was pressed with great energy, and the line reopened on the 29th of that month.

=== Jackson returned again in October 1862 ===
Jackson returned to Martinsburg in October 1862, following the Battle of Sharpsburg in Maryland. This time, not wanting to leave anything of use to the Federals, he ordered the Martinsburg roundhouse and all the shops burned." "The polygonal engine house, the half round engine house, the large and costly machine shops, warehouse, ticket and telegraph offices, the company's hotel and dining and wash house, coalbins, sandhouses, blacksmith shop and tool houses, pumping engine for water station and connecting pipes were all destroyed. The destruction of tracks also commenced and continued ... making a total of 37½ miles of track [destroyed]", including twenty miles (32 km) of track between Harpers Ferry and North Mountain. "This time Jackson's men did not move the torn-up iron south for use on their own lines, but rather heated it over bonfires of ties and fenceposts" so that the rail line could be traced "by a continuous line of fires."

=== Following the war ===
Civil War Trails sign at Strasburg

Following the war, all but one of the locomotives taken were returned to full service in the B&O Railroad. The one locomotive not returned, Engine No. 34, had been damaged by a Union cavalry raid, and so the boiler from that engine was installed in a Confederate ironclad, the CSS Neuse, which was later destroyed. CSX, the current owner of the B&O Railroad claims that this May 1861 raid was "one of the most notorious raids in railroad history."

Garrett always remembered Stonewall Jackson's destruction of the B&O properties at Martinsburg, Virginia in June 1861, and he admired how Confederate colonel Thomas R. Sharpe, with just thirty-five men comprising six machinists, ten teamsters, and twelve laborers had moved fourteen of his big locomotives – including a Hayes Camel 198, a Mason locomotive, and a "dutch wagon" – over forty miles of dirt roads from Martinsburg to Strasburg, Virginia. When the indispensable William Prescott Smith [B&O RR Chief of Transportation] died prematurely at age forty-seven in 1872, Garrett hired Sharpe to replace him as master of transportation

— Gary L. Browne

== Raid controversy ==
Historian James I. Robertson Jr. in his biography of Stonewall Jackson calls the May 23 raid and the subterfuge engaged in by Jackson as "the most intriguing anecdote of the first weeks of the war." He states, however, that "John. D. Imboden manufactured it, Jackson biographer G. F. R. Henderson gave it credence, and writers over the past century have delighted in recounting it in detail." After reviewing the documentation for the raid, Robertson asserts:

Delightful as the story is, it is totally fictional. Jackson could not have committed these actions on his own, and he had no orders to disrupt the B&O completely. The Confederate government would not have issued such a directive while making overtures of cooperation with Maryland. If such destruction had occurred, the Union government would have screamed in protest and initiated retribution. No such reactions are recorded. For Jackson to have severed the B&O would have been a large and direct act of war against civilian commerce. The struggle between North and South had not yet reached that stage. Jackson was under strict orders not to interrupt civilian life. Further, it is inconceivable that the B&O's brilliant and hard-working president, John W. Garrett, or its indefatigable master of transportation, William Prescott Smith, would not have immediately seen through such a transparent ploy....

On May 12, 1861, Lee wrote to Jackson, "I am concerned at the feeling evinced in Maryland, & fear it may extend to other points, besides opposite Sheperdstown. It will be necessary, to allay it, if possible to confine yourself to a strictly defensive course." In a May 22, 1861 letter to General Milledge L. Bonham at Manassas Junction, Lee further elaborated Virginia's policy, "But it is proper for me to state to you that the policy of the State at present is strictly defensive. No provocation for attack will therefore be given, but every attack resisted to the extent of your means."

Robertson writes that there is no record in the Official Records of this massive capture of railroad stock, although William Prescott Smith's personal records on the war do record a small seizure of a train of cars on May 14 in Harper's Ferry. In analyzing the way the Imboden "fable" has spread, Robertson states that both railroad historians and later general historians used it as their source in their own works. The works Robertson cites as examples are Hungerford's Baltimore & Ohio Railroad, Thomas Weber's The Northern Railroads in the Civil War, Angus James Johnson III's Virginia Railroads in the Civil War, Allen Tate's Stonewall Jackson: The Good Soldier, Burke Davis' They Called Him Stonewall,and Clifford Dowdey's The Land They Fought For.

Robertson writes of the reliability of Imboden as a source for information on the war:

...Imboden's postwar writings must be ignored in most instances or handled with extreme caution in the other cases. The impeccable Jed Hotchkiss in later years wrote [in an April 26, 1895 letter to historian G. F. R. Henderson] of Imboden (whom he had known in prewar Staunton): 'I do not like to say that my friend is unreliable; and yet the truth of the matter is that his statements will not bear the tests of criticism. ... He writes from a confused memory and never takes the trouble of verifying his statements by a reference to documents.'

Biographer Byron Farwell echoes Robertson's views, stating the Imboden story is, "A wonderful tale, it illustrates Jackson's aggressiveness. But it almost certainly never happened." He adds:

The story of the captured locomotives was told by John Imboden, who said that he himself took part in the raid, but there are disturbing elements to his story. Such a dramatic event ought to have stimulated many accounts, as did the later transfer of the locomotives from Martinsburg to Strasburg. If it occurred, Jackson did not report it to Lee, and that would have been a direct violation of Jackson's orders not to disturb commerce and not to cross into Maryland unless it was absolutely necessary. The story is, however, repeated as gospel in every other biography.

== See also ==
- Baltimore and Ohio Railroad Martinsburg Shops
- Winchester in the American Civil War
