= Percy Wyndham (soldier) =

British soldier (1833-1879)

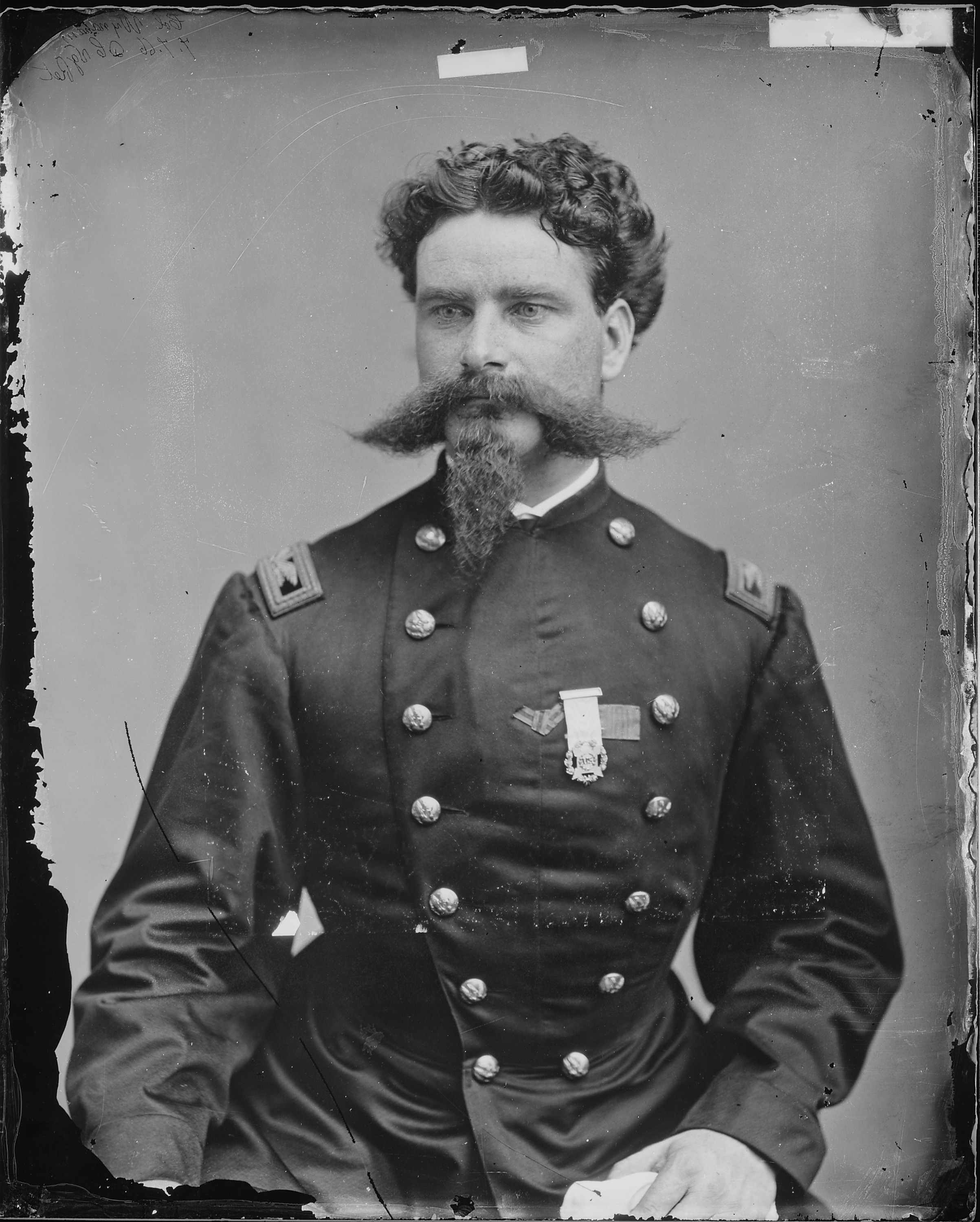
- Wyndham during the American Civil War
- Born: 22 September 1833; The Downs, English Channel
- Died: 27 January 1879 (aged 45); Rangoon, Burma, British Raj
- Military career
- Allegiance: French Second Republic United Kingdom; Austria-Hungary; Kingdom of Sardinia; United States Kingdom of Italy
- Branch: French Navy (1848–1850); British Army (1851–1852); Austrian Army (1852–1860); Garibaldi's Volunteers (1860–1861); Union Army (1862–1864); Royal Italian Army
- Rank: Colonel (Union Army)
- Commands: 1st New Jersey Cavalry Regiment
- Conflicts: French Revolution of 1848 Expedition of the Thousand: Palermo; Battle of Volturnus; American Civil War: Battle of Thoroughfare Gap; Battle of Brandy Station
- Awards: Military Order of Savoy
- Other work: balloonist

Colonel Percy Wyndham (22 September 1833 – 27 January 1879) was an English soldier and adventurer who served in the armed forces of several countries and saw active service during the Italian Risorgimento and the American Civil War.

== Life ==
Wyndham claimed to be the son of Colonel Charles Wyndham, a regular soldier who served in various Light Dragoon regiments of the British Army and was an ADC to the Duke of Wellington before becoming Lieutenant Colonel of the 36th Regiment of Foot. Wyndham had been born in 1833 on board the ship Arab in the Downs. He had begun his career at the age of fifteen, fighting in the Students' Corps during the French Revolution of 1848. He said that in July of the same year he was commissioned into the French Navy as a "marine ensign", a form of midshipman, before briefly serving in the Royal Artillery of the British Army from 1851 to 1852. After that, he had served until 1860 as a cavalry officer in the Austrian Army's 8th Lancers Regiment, before travelling to Italy to serve under Garibaldi. Wyndham said he had fought with Garibaldi at Palermo, Nuloggo, Rager, and Capua, at the last of which he had been promoted lieutenant-colonel, given command of a brigade, and knighted by King Victor Emmanuel, who had appointed him a knight of the Military Order of Savoy; and that was why he sometimes used the title of "Sir" in English. He had continued to command a brigade until on 8 October 1861, following the outbreak of the American Civil War, he had been given leave to enable him to offer his services to the Union.

Whatever his origins, Wyndham undoubtedly travelled to North America and served in the Union Army during the Civil War. He was appointed command of the 1st New Jersey Cavalry Regiment in February 1862, and his regiment spent the early spring defending Washington, D.C.. By May, Wyndham and the 1st New Jersey Cavalry were in George D. Bayard's cavalry brigade in Irvin McDowell's Dept. of the Rappahannock, and were sent to the Shenandoah Valley to confront Stonewall Jackson's Confederate forces. Pursuing Jackson up the valley, Wyndham was taken prisoner in a skirmish outside Harrisonburg, Virginia on 6 June 1862, but was exchanged in a prisoner swap only a few weeks later. Not paroled until August 17, however, Wyndham missed the Battle of Cedar Mountain. The 1st New Jersey Cavalry would continue to fight in Bayard's brigade, seeing action at the Battle of Thoroughfare Gap, Second Battle of Bull Run, and the Battle of Antietam. While Bayard's brigade subsequently accompanied the Union army to Fredericksburg, Virginia, Wyndham and the 1st New Jersey remained in northern Virginia, leading a reconnaissance expedition to Snicker's Gap and Berryville, Virginia.

On 9 June 1863 Wyndham was wounded at the Battle of Brandy Station, and thereafter he served in Washington, D. C. While there, his namesake the English politician Percy S. Wyndham accused him of being a fraud, prompting Wyndham to give an account of his career, supported by documentary evidence. His pointed reply to the other Wyndham included the statement that

Some men make a name for themselves; others die contemplating the parents who gave them their name.

Wyndham applied for promotion to Brigadier, with a recommendation from Major-General Joseph Hooker, who said of him "I found him capable, prompt, and efficient... and with an enemy in his front, enterprising and brave". However, he was refused the promotion, after a fellow officer had accused him of disloyalty and of considering transferring to the Confederate Army. Wyndham continued to draw his army pay until he retired from the Union's service on 5 July 1864. According to some accounts, he next commanded a military school for boys.

In 1866, Wyndham returned to Italy to continue his military service in the Royal Italian Army. That completed, after several failed business ventures he journeyed to India where, after selling his military decorations to support himself, he took to giving hot air ballooning demonstrations to earn a living. On 27 January 1879 he was killed when his balloon burst open and fell from a height of about three hundred feet into a lake near Rangoon, Burma. A newspaper there reported his death, concluding "Thus ended a singular and adventurous career". He is buried in England

His death was noted as far away as the Highlands of Scotland, here is a report from The Inverness Courier, February 6, 1879. All spelling, punctuation and capitalisation as per the original publication.

"THROWN FROM A BALLOON. News of a sad accident comes from Rangoon. Colonel Percy Wyndham, a gentleman well known in Calcutta and Rangoon, announced an ascent in a balloon of his own construction. After attaining a height of about 500 feet the balloon burst, and the unfortunate aeronaut fell into the Royal lake, whence he was extricated quite dead. Colonel Percy Wyndham was a distinguished soldier of fortune. He served with great credit under General Garibaldi, and the Northern Army during the American War. He came to Calcutta some years ago, where he established a successful comic paper, then he became impresario of the opera, next he entered the services of the King of Burma as Commander-in-Chief. Soon, however, quarrelling with that potentate, he went to Rangoon, where his characteristic death closed a career more chequered than falls the lot of many in this commonplace age."
