= Loudoun Branch of the Manassas Gap Railroad =

The Loudoun Branch of the Manassas Gap Railroad was a planned branch extension of the Manassas Gap Railroad that was to connect the Orange and Alexandria Railroad (O&A) to Harpers Ferry and the Baltimore and Ohio Railroad.

== Route ==
The route was to diverge from the O&A near Centerville and head west through Loudoun County, crossing the Catoctin Mountain along the Goose Creek water gap, then turning northward towards the village of Goose Creek (present day Lincoln) and Purcel's Store (present day Purcellville) before continuing northerly, along the eastern base of Short Hill Mountain. At the north end of the mountain, the line was to bear westward passing around the Short Hill and Blue Ridge Mountain along the bank of the Potomac River to its confluence with the Shenandoah River, at which point it would cross the latter river to reach Harpers Ferry.

== Construction and demise ==
Work started on the line in 1851, the same year as the main line of the Manassas Gap Railroad. The railroad was graded from Chantilly as far as Purcel's Store including the partial construction of a tunnel under the Catoctin Mountain along the Goose Creek. Tracks were laid as far as the Old Carolina Road (present day U.S. Route 15).

Construction was halted due to financial troubles of the railroad backers during the Panic of 1857. Any hope of resuming work and completing the line was erased when in 1861 when Confederate troops tore up the tracks as they abandoned Alexandria to establish a line at Manassas Junction.

Today the informed and dedicated historian can still find the railroad bed and tunnel. A well-preserved section of roadbed exists between Centreville Road and State Road 28 in Fairfax County, Virginia, just east of the Sully Plantation historical site.

Several statements in the original listing are incorrect:

1) it was NOT a branch of the O&A but a branch of the Manassas Gap RR's Independent Line 2) it was not begun in 1851 but was not even chartered until 1853 and what work was done was completed between 1854 and 1857. 3) It started in CHANTILLY, not Centreville, Va.
