= Galemont =

Historic house in Virginia, United States

- U.S. National Register of Historic Places
- Virginia Landmarks Register
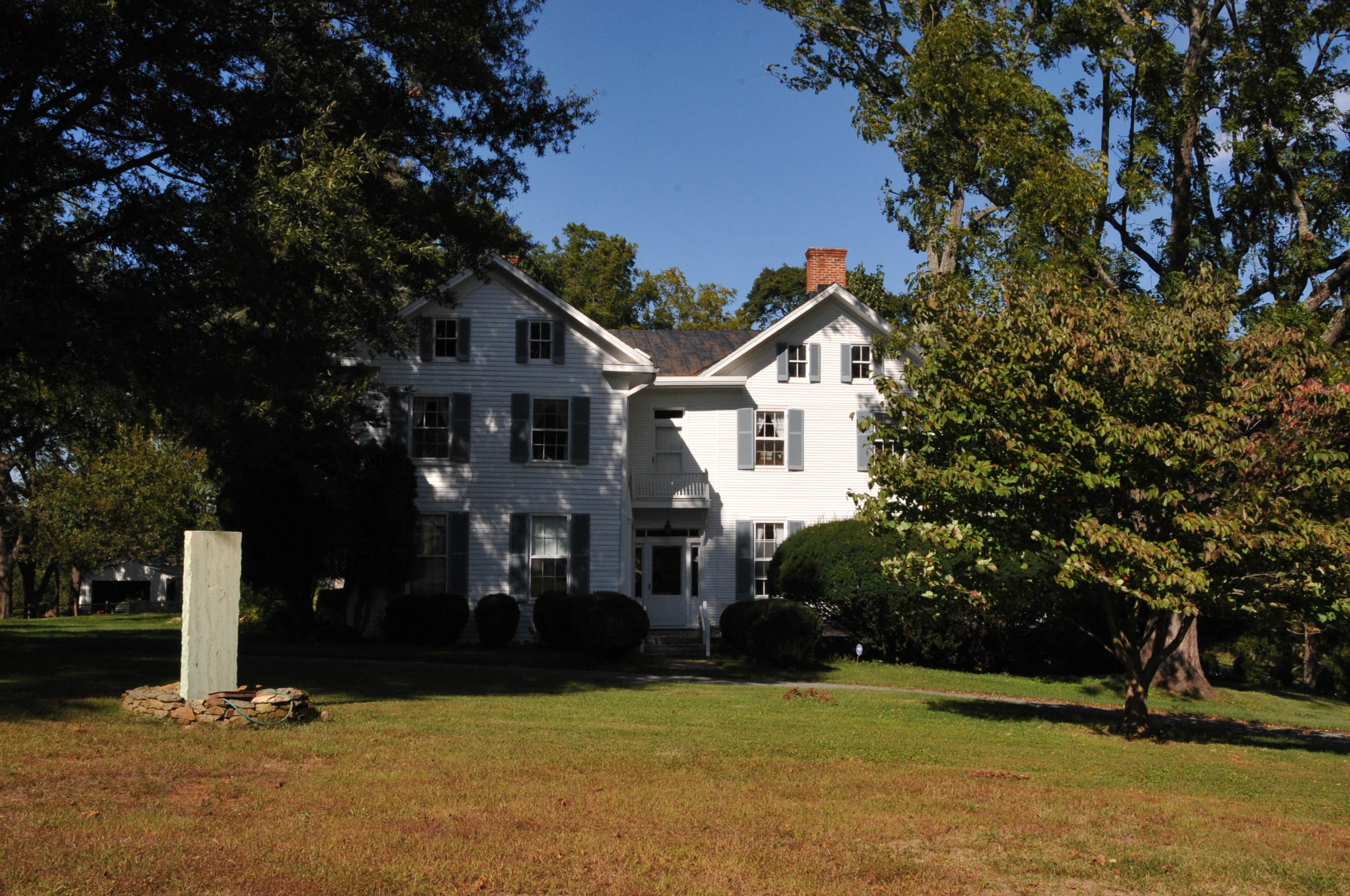

- Location within Northern Virginia Location within Virginia Location within the United States
- Location: 5071 Galemont Ln., Broad Run, Virginia
- Coordinates: 38°50′00″N 77°44′05″W
- Area: 237.7 acres (96.2 ha)
- Built: c. 1778-1817, 1857, 1872, 1903
- Architect: Robertson, Thomas Bolling, Sr.; Bayly, Sampson P.
- Architectural style: Federal, Greek Revival, Folk Victorian
- NRHP reference No.: 12000824
- VLR No.: 030-0521

Significant dates
- Added to NRHP: September 25, 2012
- Designated VLR: June 21, 2012

Galemont is a historic home located at Broad Run, Fauquier County, Virginia. It was built between 1778 and 1817, as a 1 1/2-story, two-room, stone hall-and-parlor-plan residence with a one-room cellar. It was expanded about 1857, and included Federal / Greek Revival-style details. In 1872, a new I-plan house was built less than 20 feet east of the original house, and connected to make one large, multi-period building with transverse center halls. It was further enlarged in 1903, with a connection to the stone kitchen and two-story wing. The later additions added a Folk Victorian style to the house. Also on the property are the contributing garage, silo, old shed, pond, a fieldstone wall (c. 1824), and two archaeological sites: the 1852 Broad Run Train Depot site and an intact segment of the Thoroughfare Gap Road.

It was listed on the National Register of Historic Places in 2012.
