= Broad Run, Virginia =

Unincorporated community in Virginia, United States

- Unincorporated community
- Location within Northern Virginia Location within Virginia Location within the United States
- Coordinates: 38°49′47″N 77°43′17″W
- Country: United States
- State: Virginia
- County: Fauquier
- Time zone: UTC−5 (Eastern (EST))
  - Summer (DST): UTC−4 (EDT)
- ZIP codes: 20137

Broad Run is a small unincorporated village in Fauquier County, Virginia, United States. It is on Bust Head Road just north of Interstate 66 and State Route 55 near the Prince William County line. Broad Run is named after the waterway that flows through the town. Broad Run has its own ZIP Code of 20137, and its post office serves a population of 1,510.

The town of Broad Run was a thriving community in the late 19th century and early 20th century. The decline of the railroads spelled the demise of the town, and all that is left of the town proper is less than five homes from that period, and a few stone foundations and chimneys for buildings that no longer exist. A ramp for loading freight trains still exists on the still active Norfolk Southern freight line, but is covered with weeds and in such disrepair as to be no longer useful. The most notable historical site in Broad Run is Chapman's Mill, a.k.a. Beverley's Mill, which can be found two-thirds of a mile ESE from the center of the town of Broad Run. The Battle of Thoroughfare Gap, a seemingly inconsequential but eventually very important battle of the Civil War, was fought at Chapman's Mill. The Thoroughfare Gap Battlefield and Galemont are listed on the National Register of Historic Places.

The Broad Run postal area is an almost exclusively residential area which is mostly in Fauquier County, with the northeastern section in Prince William County. The few businesses that can be found in the Broad Run postal area are generally home businesses or agricultural businesses. Notably, Sharkawi Farms grows a wide variety of spices that are sold locally and Meriwether Vineyard is home to Pearmund Cellars Winery. The Broad Run postal area, at its southern edge, also contains what was historically the town of New Baltimore. Much of what is currently considered the modern-day New Baltimore is not in the Broad Run postal area.

Several old building foundations and graveyards may be found in the large wooded areas in the Broad Run postal area, some dating back over 200 years.
