= Thoroughfare Gap Battlefield =

American Civil War battlefield

- U.S. National Register of Historic Places
- Virginia Landmarks Register
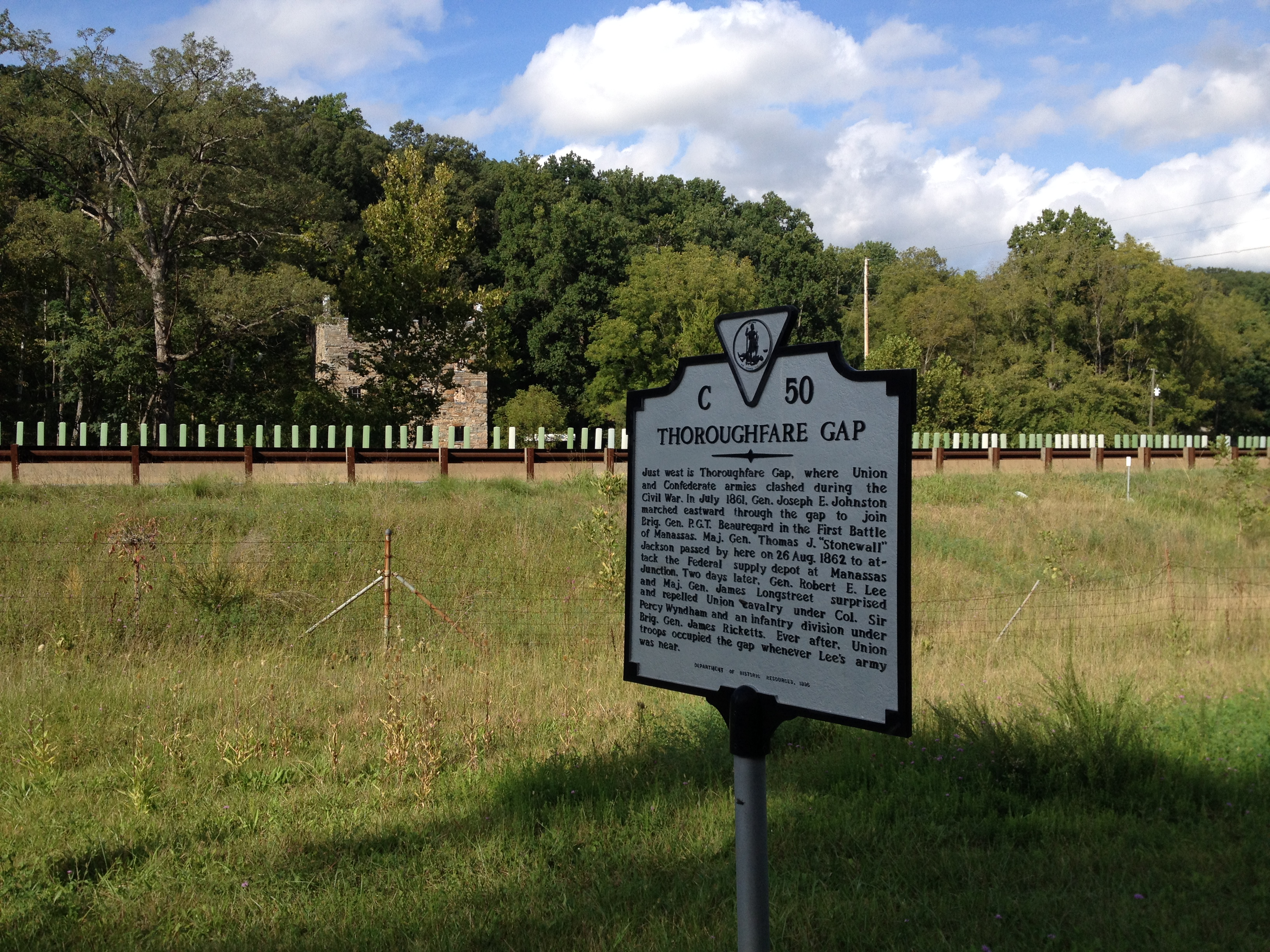
- Historical marker, with Beverly Mill in the background

- Location within Northern Virginia Location within Virginia Location within the United States
- Location: Junction of Interstate 66 and State Route 55, Broad Run, Virginia
- Coordinates: 38°49′30″N 77°42′47″W
- Area: 514 acres (208 ha)
- Built: 1862
- Architectural style: Federal, Mid 19th Century Revival
- NRHP reference No.: 99001374
- VLR No.: 030-1016

Significant dates
- Added to NRHP: November 18, 1999
- Designated VLR: June 16, 1999

Thoroughfare Gap Battlefield is a historic American Civil War battlefield located at Thoroughfare Gap, Broad Run, in Fauquier and Prince William counties in Virginia. It was the site of the Battle of Thoroughfare Gap. The property includes a number of resources present at the time of the battle including the separately listed Beverley Mill, a five-story, coursed-rubble stone building set into the north side of Thoroughfare Gap. Meadowlands, the Chapman's house and the second Upper Mill are clearly visible on the landscape, as well as an important ice pit and a walled cemetery associated with the Chapman family.

It was listed on the National Register of Historic Places in 1999. The Civil War Trust (a division of the American Battlefield Trust) and its partners have acquired and preserved 109 acres (0.44 km^{2}) of the battlefield. The battlefield is accessible from a walking trail adjacent to the ruins of Chapman's Mill, located north of Interstate 66 on Beverly Mill Drive. Sharpshooters used the mill's upper floor windows to defend the pass. Historic and wayside markers are placed along Virginia Route 55 just south of the mill.
