= Thoroughbred (disambiguation) =

The Thoroughbred is a horse breed known for its use in horse racing.

Thoroughbred may also refer to:

== Literature and films ==
- Thoroughbred (series), a series of young-adult novels that revolves around equestrianism
- The Thoroughbred (1916 film), an American silent drama film
- The Thoroughbred (1928 film), a British silent sports film
- The Thoroughbred (1930 film), an American sports drama film
- Thoroughbred (film), a 1936 Australian race-horse drama
- Thoroughbreds (1944 film), an American film
- Thoroughbreds (2017 film), an American film

== Music ==
- Thoroughbred (album), a 1976 album by Carole King, U.S.
- Louisville Thoroughbreds, a men's chorus based in Louisville, Kentucky, U.S.

== Sports ==
- The Thoroughbred Corp. a California-based Thoroughbred horse racing and breeding operation
- Scone Thoroughbreds, an Australian country rugby league team based in Scone, New South Wales
- Atlanta Thoroughbreds, an American indoor football team
- Owensboro Thoroughbreds, an American basketball team
- Skidmore Thoroughbreds
- Thoroughbred racing
  - Thoroughbred Stakes, a horse race in Great Britain

== Other uses ==
- Thoroughbred, a microprocessor from the AMD Athlon series
- Thoroughbred (train), a passenger train of the Monon Railroad

== See also ==
- Purebred, the cultivated varieties or cultivars of an animal species, sometimes confused with thoroughbred
