= Thoroughfare Gap (Bull Run Mountain) =

- Location within Virginia
- Elevation: 423 feet (129 m)
- Traversed by: Virginia Route 55; Interstate 66

Third Approach
- Location: Fauquier / Prince William counties, Virginia, United States
- Range: Bull Run Mountains Blue Ridge Mountains
- Coordinates: 38°49′28″N 77°42′57″W

Thoroughfare Gap is a water gap in the Bull Run Mountains created by Broad Run between High Point Mountain to the north and Bisquit Mountain to the south. It is located on the border of Prince William and Fauquier counties in Virginia.

True to its name, the small gap is traversed by Interstate 66, Virginia State Route 55 and the Manassas Gap Railroad.

The ruins of historic Beverley Mill are located at the gap.

The gap was the site of the 1862 Battle of Thoroughfare Gap during the American Civil War. The Thoroughfare Gap Battlefield was listed on the National Register of Historic Places in 1999.
