= Battle of Thoroughfare Gap =

Battle on August 28, 1862, in Fauquier County

- Part of the American Civil War
Date	August 28, 1862
Location	Fauquier County and Prince William County, Virginia 38.83°N 77.72°W
Result	Confederate victory

Belligerents
United States (Union)	(Confederate States of America) CSA (Confederacy)

Commanders and leaders
James B. Ricketts	James Longstreet

Units involved
Union Army of Virginia	Confederate Army of Northern Virginia

Strength
5,000	28,000

Casualties and losses
- 100
- Location of the battle in Virginia

The Battle of Thoroughfare Gap, also known as Chapman's Mill, took place on August 28, 1862, in Fauquier County and Prince William County, Virginia, as part of the Northern Virginia Campaign of the American Civil War. Confederate forces under Maj. Gen. James Longstreet successfully drove back Union forces under Brig. Gen. James B. Ricketts and Col. Percy Wyndham, allowing his corps to unite with that of Thomas J. "Stonewall" Jackson prior to the Second Battle of Bull Run (Second Manassas).

== Background ==
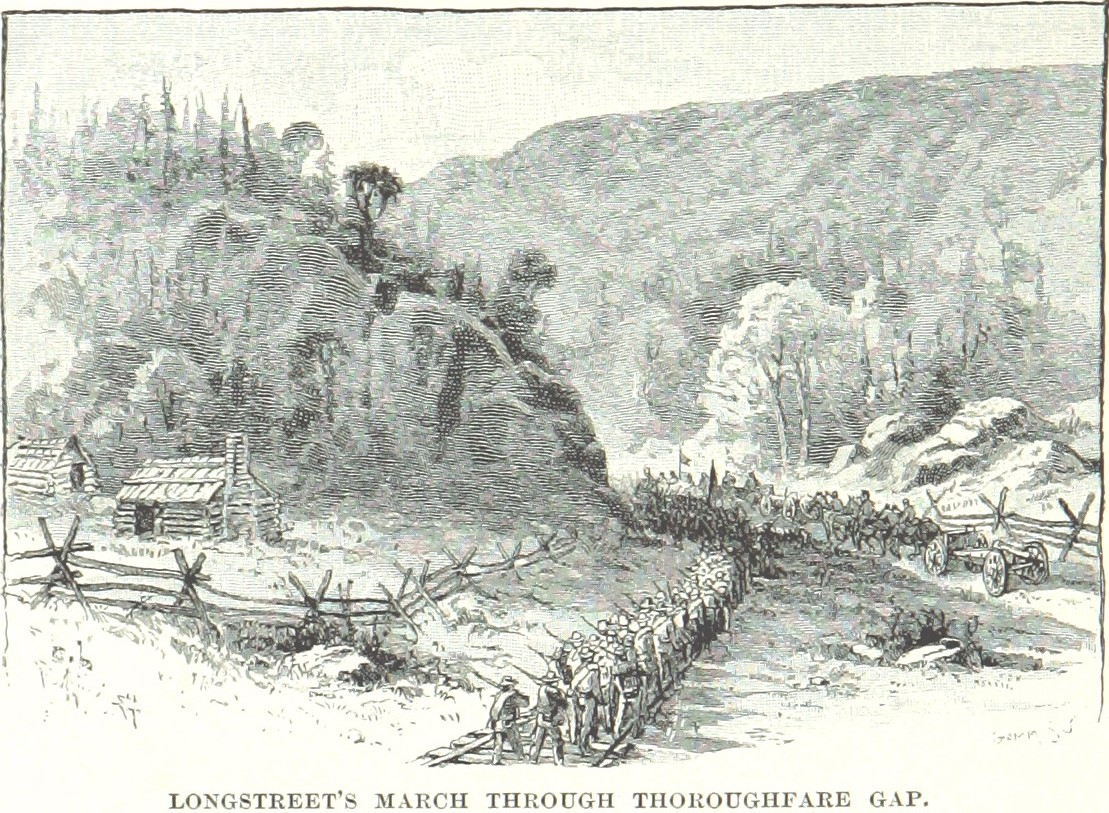
Longstreet's troops march through the Gap

On August 26, Maj. Gen. Stonewall Jackson led his corps of the Army of Northern Virginia through Thoroughfare Gap, on his way to raiding the Union supply depot at the Manassas Junction. In response to the raid, the following day Union Maj. Gen. Irwin McDowell set out from Warrenton to Manassas Junction to engage Jackson. In order to protect his army's left flank, he dispatched Brig. Gen. James B. Ricketts's brigade and the 1st New Jersey Cavalry under Sir Percy Wyndham towards the Gap. Ricketts stopped at Gainesville, 6 miles (9.7 km) to the east, while Wyndham occupied the gap. Maj. Gen. James Longstreet's corps, meanwhile, followed in the path of Jackson's march and was approaching the gap from the west late on the evening of August 27.

== Battle ==
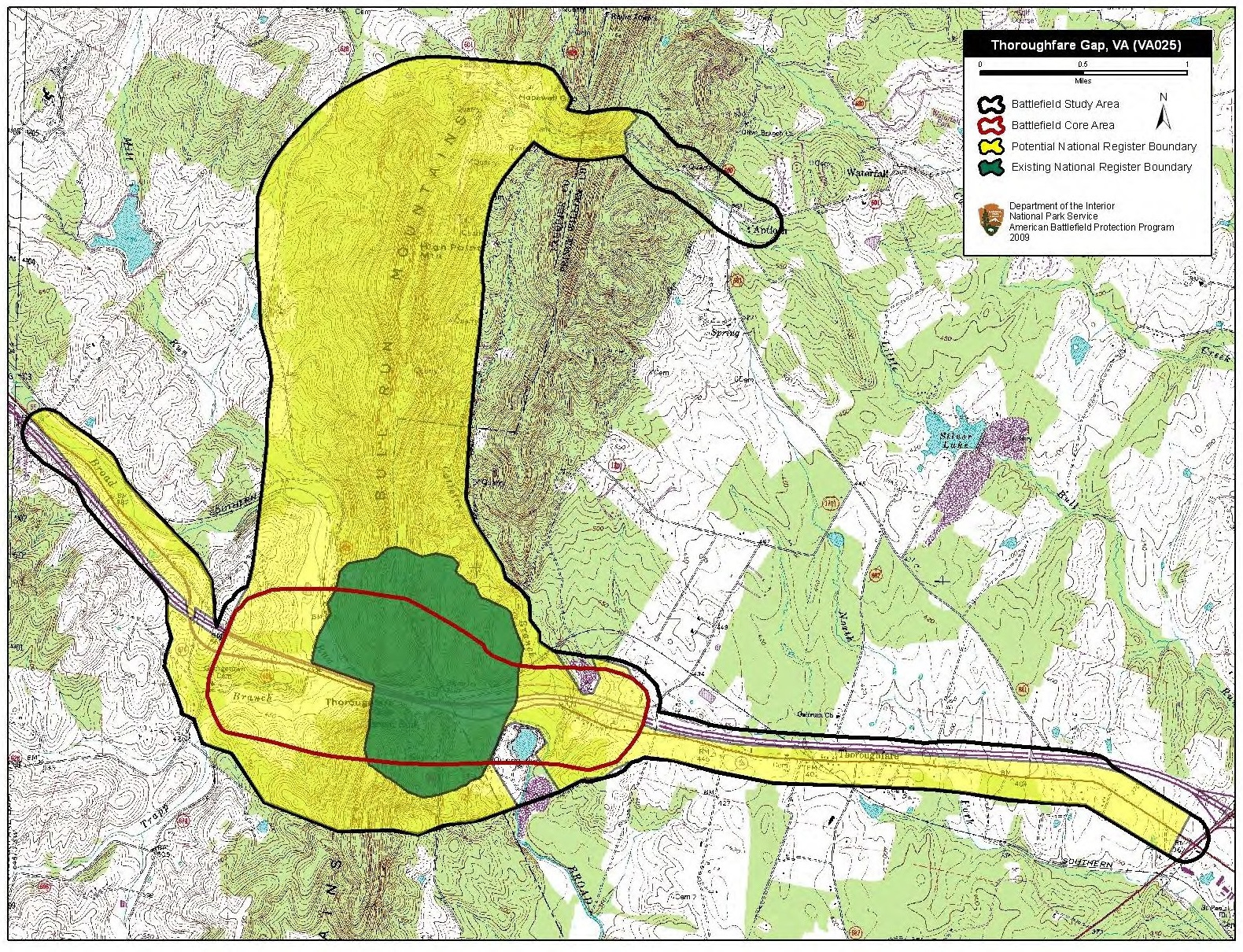
Map of Thoroughfare Gap Battlefield core and study areas by the American Battlefield Protection Program

At 9:30 a.m. on August 28, Wyndham's troopers encountered Longstreet's vanguard while attempting to fell trees across the road on the east side of the gap. Wyndham immediately dispatched a courier to Ricketts at Gainesville. Ricketts's advance was slow, however, and he had only reached Haymarket, 3 miles (4.8 km) to the east, by 2 p.m. By that point, Wyndham had been driven from the Gap and Longstreet took possession of it. The Federal position was still strong though, as a series of low-lying ridges east of the gap provided an excellent ground for defending the road to Gainesville, and the Confederates had not occupied the hills to the north and south of the gap.

In order to meet this Union threat, Longstreet developed a plan, whereby he would command the gap from the high ground on either side and then outflank the Union position on the eastern ridge. The 9th Georgia from Col. George T. Anderson's brigade was sent to Chapman's Mill on the east side of the gap to repulse a Federal attack by the 11th Pennsylvania, who ironically, to reach the gap, had to remove the trees felled by Wyndham earlier that morning. The impediment allowed Anderson to send half of his brigade up to the slope to the north of the gap to occupy the high ground while still having sufficient men to repulse the 11th Pennsylvania. To the south of the gap, the 2nd and 20th Georgia regiments from Henry Benning's brigade raced up the slopes on the west against the 13th Massachusetts, climbing up the east side. The Georgians won out and drove the 13th Massachusetts back down the steep slopes.

With the gap firmly in Confederate control, Col. Evander M. Law's brigade was ordered up and over the ridge to the north of the gap to attack the Federal right. At the same time, Brig. Gen. Cadmus M. Wilcox was sent with three brigades 6 miles (9.7 km) to the north, through Hopewell Gap, to outflank the Federal position and attack its rear. When Law's brigade came down the eastern slope of the mountain and attacked the Federal right, Ricketts sent the 84th New York against them, temporarily checking Law's advance. The 2nd and 20th Georgia, however, pressed down the slopes to the south and soon attacked the Federal left. With his position rapidly becoming untenable, Ricketts decided to fall back on Gainesville, leaving the gap to the Confederates before Wilcox could cut off his line of retreat.

== Aftermath ==
In terms of casualties, the battle was small, with only 100 casualties on both sides combined, but had major strategic consequences. Ricketts failed to fully comprehend the importance of keeping the two wings of the Confederate army apart. Rather than entrenching his force in a strong defensive position at the gap, the easiest and quickest crossing of the Bull Run Range, he left only cavalry there while he sat a half-day's march away at Gainesville, protecting the railroad, a job much more suited for his cavalry. As such, he lost the advantage and the only hope his small force had in seriously hindering Longstreet's advance. His failure to do so allowed the two wings of the Confederate army to unite at Manassas and virtually ensured Pope's defeat during the Second Battle of Bull Run on August 29.

== Battlefield preservation ==
The Thoroughfare Gap Battlefield was listed on the National Register of Historic Places in 1999."National Register Information System". National Register of Historic Places. National Park Service. July 9, 2010. The Civil War Trust (a division of the American Battlefield Trust) and its partners have acquired and preserved 109 acres (0.44 km^{2}) of the battlefield. The battlefield is accessible from a walking trail adjacent to the ruins of Chapman's Mill, located north of Interstate 66 on Beverly Mill Drive. Sharpshooters used the mill's upper floor windows to defend the pass. Historic and wayside markers are placed along Virginia Route 55 just south of the mill.
