= Broad Run (Occoquan River tributary) =

Coordinates: 38.68817°N 77.48888°W

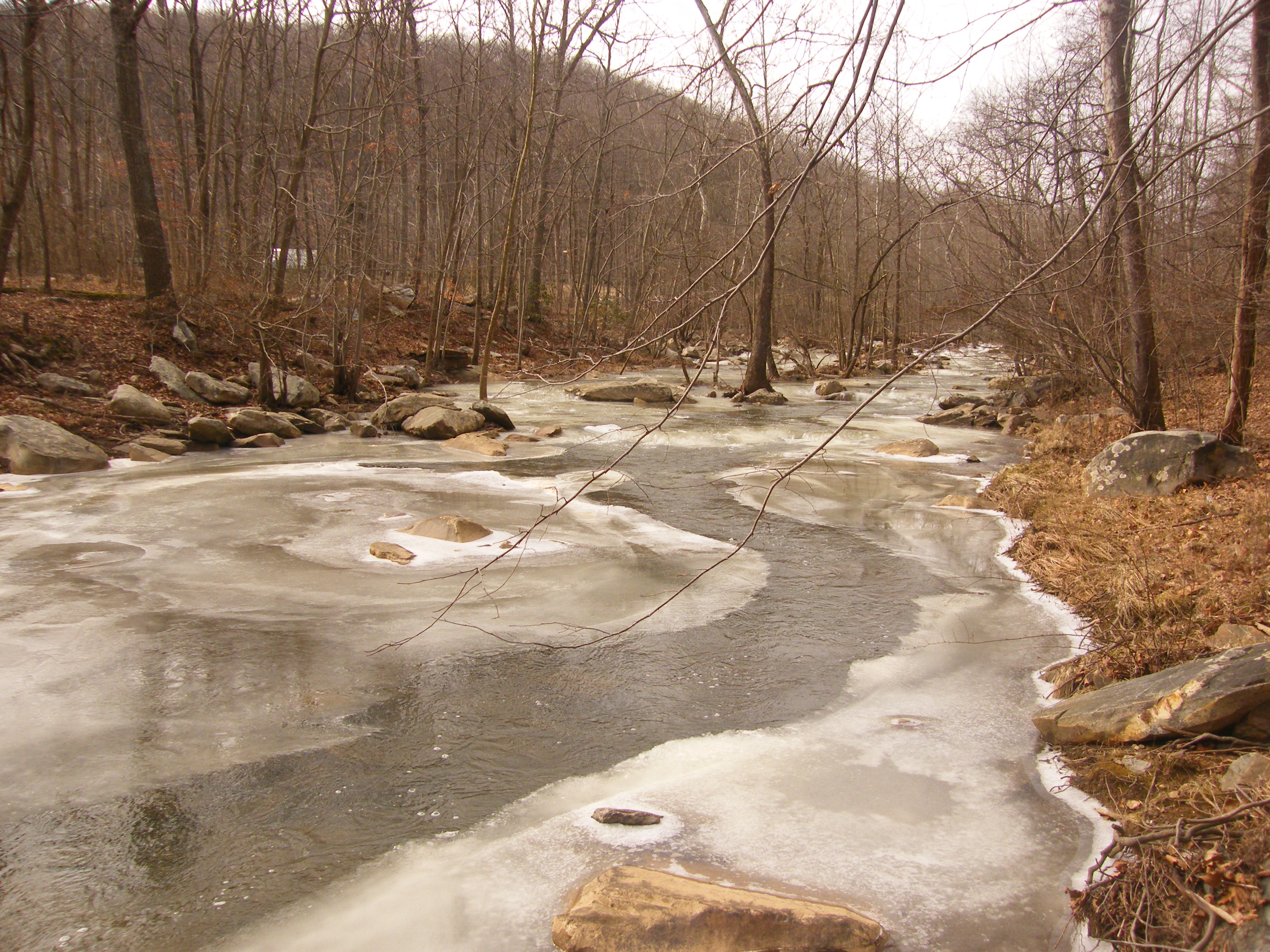
- Broad Run as it flows through Thoroughfare Gap in the Bull Run Mountains

Location
- Country: United States

Physical characteristics
- Source
  - location: Fauquier County, Virginia
  - elevation: 138 feet (42 m)
- Mouth
  - location: Occoquan River
- Length: 38.0 mi (61.2 km)

Broad Run is a 38.0-mile-long (61.2 km) tributary of the Occoquan River in the U.S. state of Virginia. It rises in Fauquier County and passes through Thoroughfare Gap. A gazetteer from the mid-nineteenth century described it as a small stream, a valuable mill stream.

The creek should not be confused with the nearby Broad Run (a tributary of the Potomac River) that flows through Loudoun County, Virginia.

It ultimately feeds the Chesapeake Bay Watershed.

== See also ==
- List of rivers of Virginia
