= Thoroughfare, Virginia =

Thoroughfare
- Unincorporated community
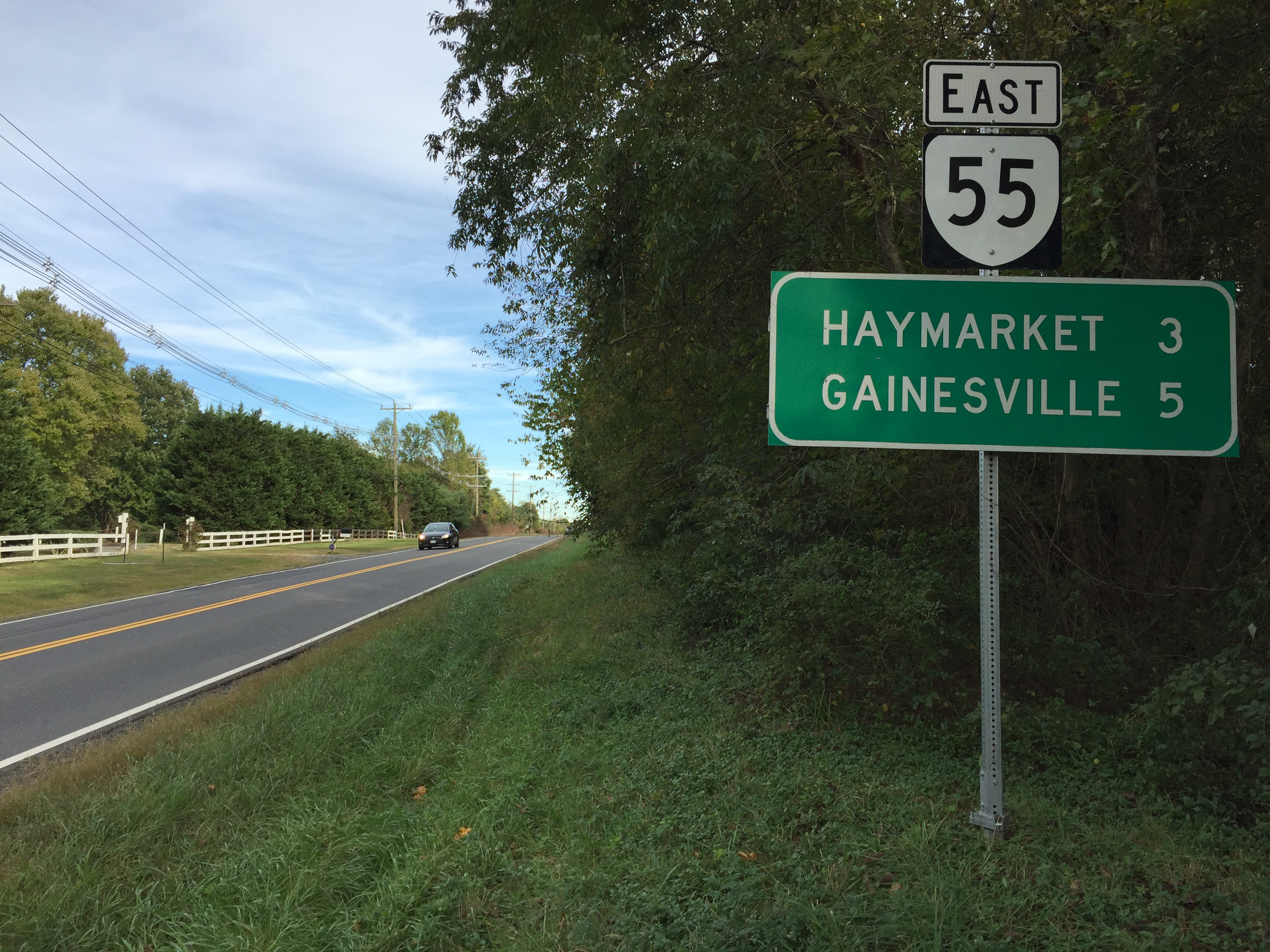
- SR 55 through Thoroughfare

- Location within the state of Virginia Thoroughfare (Virginia) Thoroughfare (the United States)
- Coordinates: 38°49′14″N 77°40′32″W
- Country: United States
- State: Virginia
- County: Prince William
- Time zone: UTC−5 (Eastern (EST))
  - Summer (DST): UTC−4 (EDT)

Thoroughfare is an unincorporated community in western Prince William County, Virginia, United States. The community is located approximately on Virginia State Route 55, about 1.5 miles west of Haymarket where the Norfolk Southern Railway tracks cross the road. The community thrived through the 1940s as a community founded by former slaves. As a place name, Thoroughfare is no longer in common use.
