= B-Line (Norfolk Southern) =

Railroad in Virginia, United States

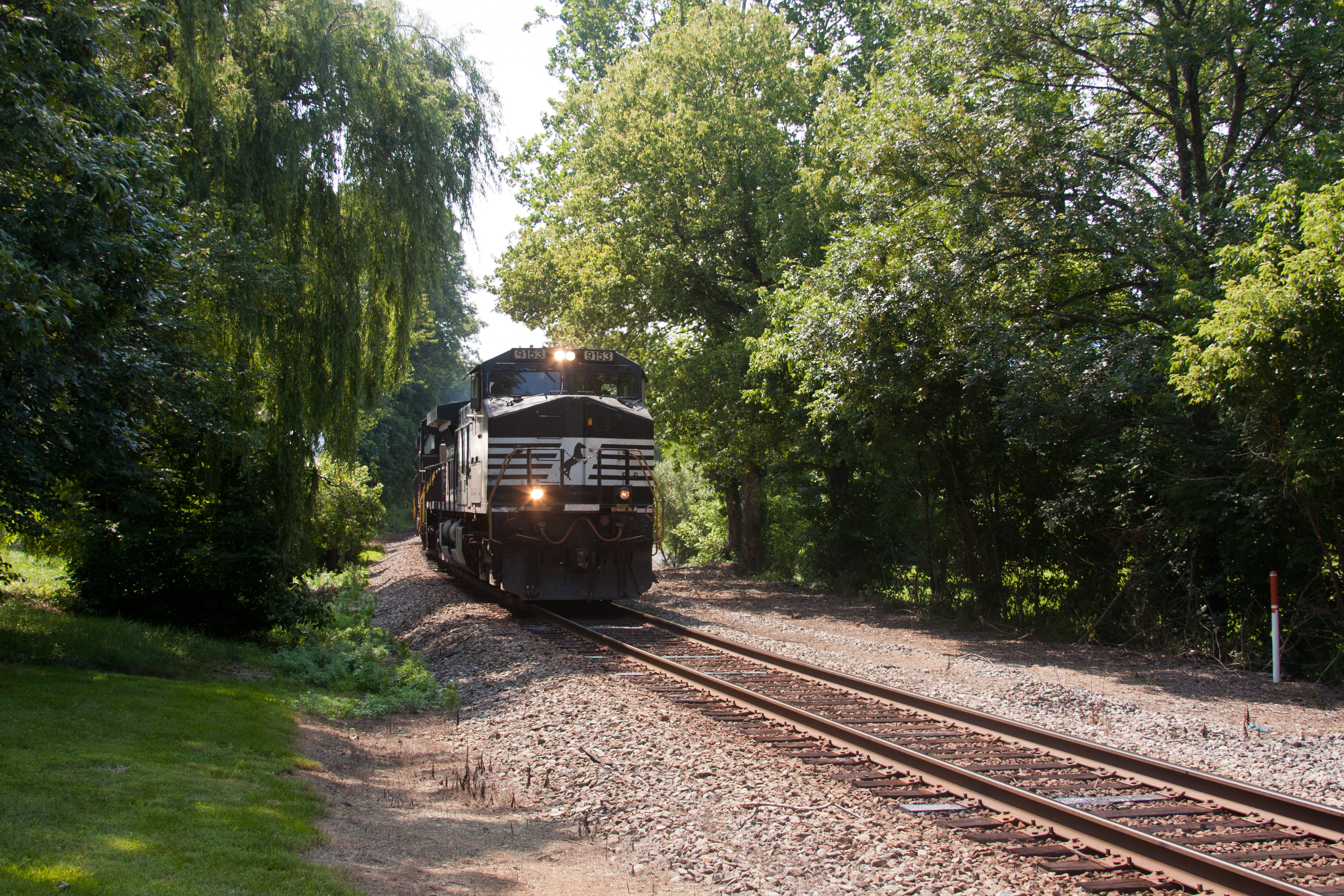
- Norfolk Southern C40-9W No. 9153 pulls a manifest through Markham, VA on the B-Line in 2011.

Overview
- Owner: Norfolk Southern Railway; Chesapeake Western Railway

History
- Opened: 1854

Technical
- Line length: 111 mi (179 km)
- Track gauge: 1,435 mm (4 ft 8 1/2 in) standard gauge

The B-Line is a railroad line in the state of Virginia in the United States. It runs 111 miles (179 km) from Manassas, Virginia, to Harrisonburg, Virginia. It was built by predecessors of the Southern Railway between 1854 and 1873. Today, ownership is split between the Norfolk Southern Railway and the Chesapeake Western Railway.

== History ==
The Manassas Gap Railroad was incorporated on March 9, 1850. It completed a line between Manassas, Virginia, and Strasburg, Virginia, 61 miles (98 km) long, in 1854. The line was badly damaged during the American Civil War. Following the war, the Manassas Gap Railroad merged with the Orange and Alexandria Railroad to create the Orange, Alexandria and Manassas Railroad. That company began building south toward Harrisonburg, Virginia. In 1872, it was consolidated with several other railroads to create the Virginia and North Carolina Railroad, later known as the Washington City, Virginia Midland and Great Southern Railway. That company completed the 50-mile (80 km) line between Strasburg and Harrisonburg in 1873.

The Washington City, Virginia Midland and Great Southern Railway was reorganized in 1881 as the Virginia Midland Railway. The Southern Railway acquired the Virginia Midland in 1898. Under the Southern Railway the line was known as the Manassas Branch. The Southern Railway merged with the Norfolk and Western Railway in 1982 to create the Norfolk Southern Railway. The Norfolk Southern sold the portion between Strasburg and Mount Jackson, Virginia, to the Chesapeake Western Railway in 1989.

The B-Line has been out of service between Edinburg, Virginia, and Strasburg, since 2013. Service between Strasburg and Front Royal ended in 2020 following a derailment. The Northern Shenandoah Valley Transportation Preservation Corporation is seeking proposals for restoring service on that portion of the line.

== Route ==
The eastern end of the line is in Manassas, where it connects with Norfolk Southern's Washington District. It crosses the ex-Norfolk and Western Railway Hagerstown District at Front Royal, Virginia. In Strasburg, it connects with the Shenandoah Subdivision. Norfolk Southern ownership ends south of Edinburg.
