= Washington District =

Railway line in Virginia, United States

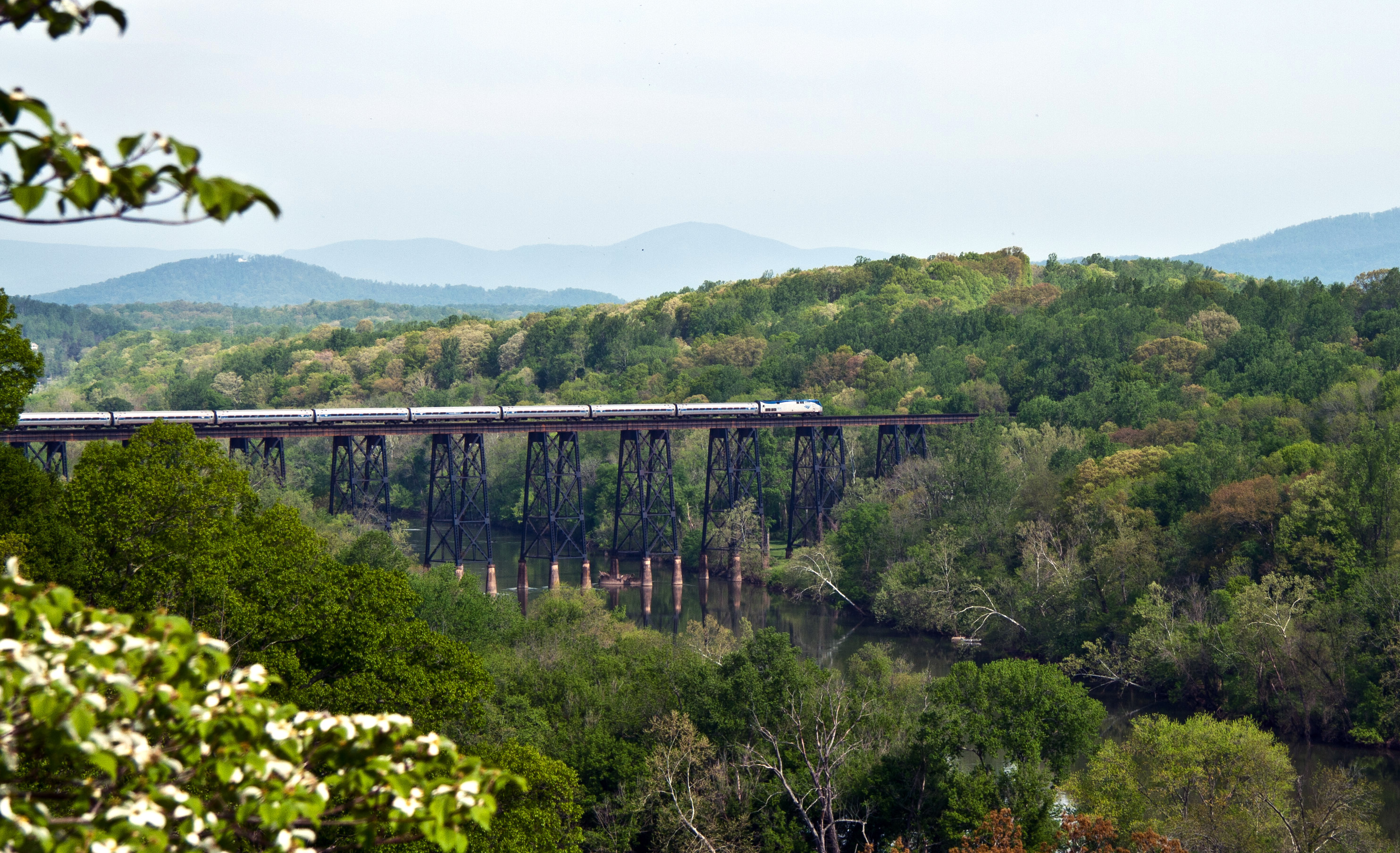
- The Washington District crossing the James River

Overview
- Status: Active
- Owner: Norfolk Southern; Virginia Passenger Rail Authority
- Locale: Virginia
- Termini: Alexandria, VA; Lynchburg

Service
- Type: Freight rail, Inter-city rail
- Operator(s): Norfolk Southern; Virginia Passenger Rail Authority; Amtrak

Technical
- Number of tracks: 2
- Track gauge: 4 ft 8 1/2 in (1,435 mm) standard gauge

The Washington District is a Norfolk Southern Railway line in the U.S. state of Virginia that connects Alexandria and Lynchburg. Most of the line was built from 1850 to 1860 by the Orange and Alexandria Railroad, while a small portion in the center opened in 1880 as the Charlottesville and Rapidan Railroad. Today, the line is mainly used for freight service, but Amtrak's Crescent, Cardinal and Northeast Regional passenger services use all or part of the line, and the Virginia Railway Express Manassas Line commuter service uses the northernmost portion of the line.

== Route ==
The northern end of the line is in Alexandria, Virginia, where it connects with the RF&P Subdivision. The line runs southwest approximately 166 miles (267 km) to Lynchburg, Virginia, where it continues as the Danville District. It connects to the B-Line in Manassas. In Charlottesville, Virginia, the Buckingham Branch Railroad's Washington Subdivision splits and forms a loop that rejoins the Washington District.

== History ==
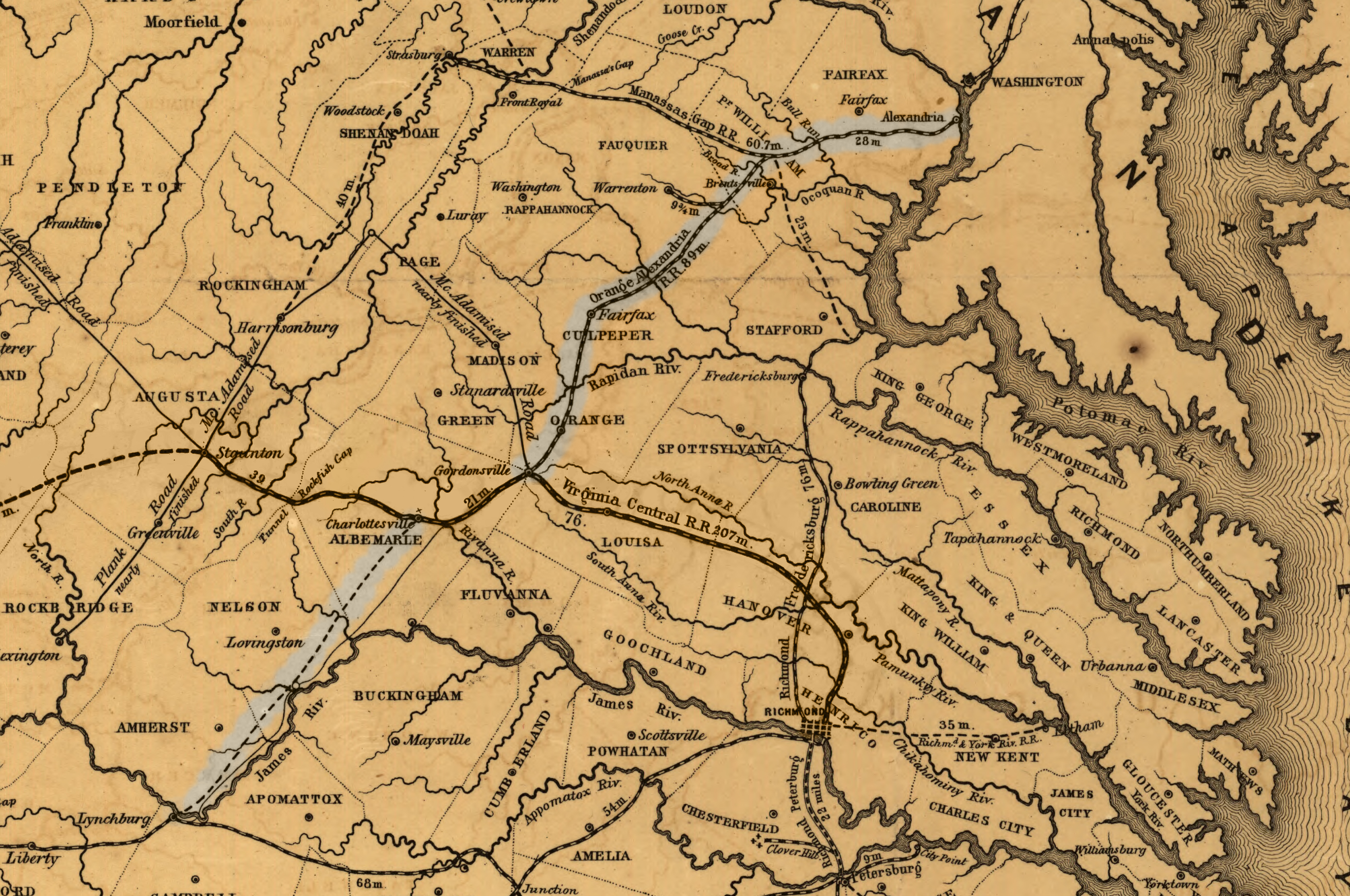
The Orange and Alexandria Railroad (highlighted) in 1852. The Washington District follows these two segments plus an additional bypass line connecting them that was built in 1880.

The line was originally constructed by the Orange and Alexandria Railroad. The portion north of Orange was constructed from 1850 to 1854. The extension south to Lynchburg was completed in 1860, with a short section in between that was part of the Virginia Central Railroad.

After the Civil War, the company came under the control of the Baltimore and Ohio Railroad. By 1881, several mergers had made it part of the Virginia Midland Railway, which in 1886 was leased to the Richmond and Danville Railroad. Both were merged into the Southern Railway in 1894, forming part of its main line.

The Southern Railway later acquired the Charlottesville and Rapidan Railroad, which had opened in 1880, bypassing the former Virginia Central Railroad segment (which is now the Buckingham Branch Railroad's Washington Subdivision). The Southern Railway merged into Norfolk Southern in 1982.

== Service ==
Part of Norfolk Southern's Piedmont Division, the line is mainly used for freight service. Major customers include a Cargill grain elevator in Culpeper (milepost 67.4). A former customer, the Pepco Generating Facility, closed in 2012. Other customers include Robinson Terminal in Springfield; Vulcan Rock Facility in Springfield; Washington Gas in Springfield; Virginia Paving in Alexandria; NS Ethanol Transflow Facility in Alexandria; and Vulcan Rock Quarry in Casanova (Casanova Branch).

Amtrak uses the line for various trains. Its Crescent uses the entire line as part of its New York City-to-New Orleans service. The Cardinal uses the portion from Alexandria to Orange as part of its New York-to-Chicago service. Since 2009, its Northeast Regional service uses the portion of the line from Lynchburg to Washington.

The Virginia Railway Express Manassas Line uses the northernmost portion of the line from Alexandria to the Broad Run station just past Manassas. In 2024, the Virginia Passenger Rail Authority purchased the portion of the line between Alexandria and Manassas, along with a passenger easement between Manassas and Broad Run.
