= Winchester and Strasburg Railroad =

Overview
- Parent company: Baltimore and Ohio Railroad
- Headquarters: Winchester, Virginia
- Dates of operation: 1867–1987
- Successor: CSX Transportation

Technical
- Track gauge: 1,435 mm (4 ft 8 1/2 in)
- Length: 19.2 miles (30.9 km)

The Winchester and Strasburg Railroad was a railroad company in the United States. It was incorporated in 1867 and completed a line between Winchester, Virginia, and Strasburg, Virginia, in 1870. It was controlled for its entire existence by the Baltimore and Ohio Railroad, and formally merged into CSX Transportation in 1987. Its line, together with that of the Winchester and Potomac Railroad, forms the Shenandoah Subdivision.

== History ==
In the years after the American Civil War the Baltimore and Ohio Railroad sought to extend its lines southwest to reach Roanoke, Virginia. It gained control of the Winchester and Potomac Railroad on July 1, 1867. The Winchester and Potomac's line extend southwest from the B&O's line at Harper's Ferry, West Virginia, to Winchester, Virginia. To the south, the bankrupt and war-ravaged Manassas Gap Railroad merged with the Orange and Alexandria Railroad to create the Orange, Alexandria and Manassas Railroad. That company owned a line running between Manassas, Virginia, and Strasburg, Virginia, and was building a new line southwest from Strasburg to Harrisonburg, Virginia.

The Winchester and Strasburg Railroad was incorporated on April 23, 1867, to close the gap between its two namesake cities. Regular service over the line began on June 20, 1870. The B&O leased the Winchester and Strasburg from the outset. The B&O took control of the Orange, Alexandria and Manassas Railroad in 1872, though that company and its lines later became part of the Southern Railway system.

The Winchester and Strasburg Railroad remained a non-operating subsidiary of the B&O for over a century, eventually being merged into CSX Transportation, the successor to the B&O, on December 29, 1987. Its line, together with that of the Winchester and Potomac, forms the Shenandoah Subdivision.
