= O&A =

O&A or O and A may refer to:

- Orange and Alexandria Railroad, a defunct railroad operating within the U.S. state of Virginia
- Opie and Anthony, a former radio talk show in the United States
