= Shenandoah Valley Railroad (short-line) =

Shortline railroad in Virginia

Coordinates: 38°8′58.9″N 79°3′37.1″W

Overview
- Reporting mark: SV
- Locale: Virginia
- Dates of operation: 1993–present
- Predecessor: Valley Railroad, Chesapeake & Western Railroad

Technical
- Track gauge: 4 ft 8 1/2 in (1,435 mm) standard gauge
- Length: 20.2 miles (32.5 kilometres)

Other
- Website: http://www.svrr-llc.com/

The Shenandoah Valley Railroad (reporting mark SV) is a shortline railroad operating 20.2 miles (32.5 km) of track between Staunton and Pleasant Valley, Virginia. The railroad interchanges with CSX and Buckingham Branch in Staunton and Norfolk Southern in Pleasant Valley. The railroad was purchased from Norfolk Southern in 1993 and is currently operated by the Durbin and Greenbrier Valley Railroad.

== History ==
The Shenandoah Valley Railroad's route was owned by the Chesapeake Western Railway until February 1992, when Norfolk Southern abandoned it due to low usage. Local parties acquired the line and contracted to various operators such as the Buckingham Branch Railroad before settling on the Durbin and Greenbrier Valley Railroad once adequate traffic returned.

In 2019, a new 600,000-square-foot (56,000 m^{2}) cold storage facility served by the Shenandoah Valley Railroad opened in Mount Crawford.

== Heritage locomotives ==
The railroad operates a restored B&O GP9, No. 6512, painted in B&O's blue and yellow colors. The locomotive was restored by the Durbin & Greenbrier Valley Railroad. It was acquired from Kanawha River Terminal’s coal facility in Ceredo, WV. The company also operates ALCO RS-11 No. 367 with a Norfolk & Western colors and EMD GP9 No. 5940 with Chesapeake & Ohio colors.

== Gallery ==
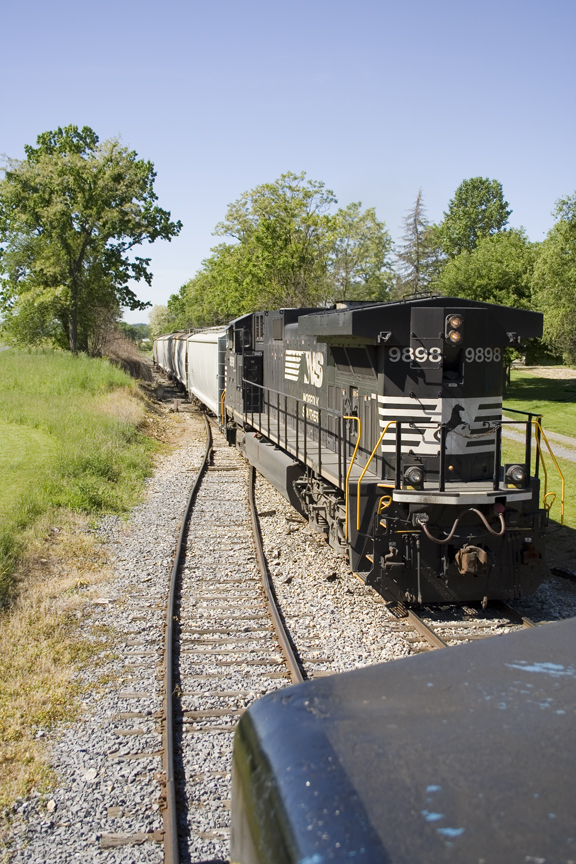
The Norfolk Southern interchange at Pleasant Valley, photo taken from the cab of Shenandoah Valley's GP38

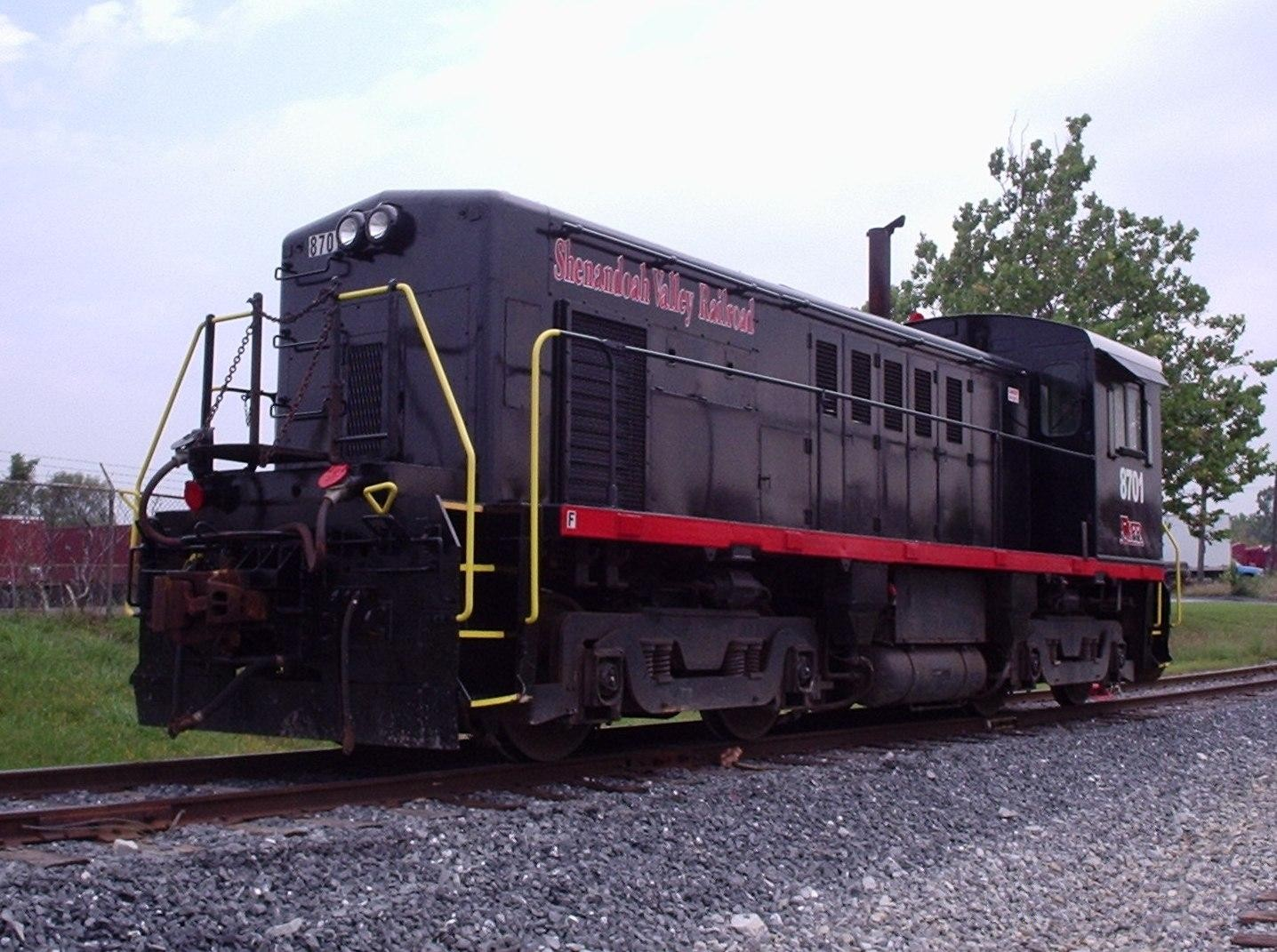
SV 8701 was ex-US Army 4043, later DLA (Defense Logistics Agency) 87001, an RS4TC with serial number 61286, seen here in Verona. Mechanical difficulties led to the locomotive being retired from the roster and sold for scrap.

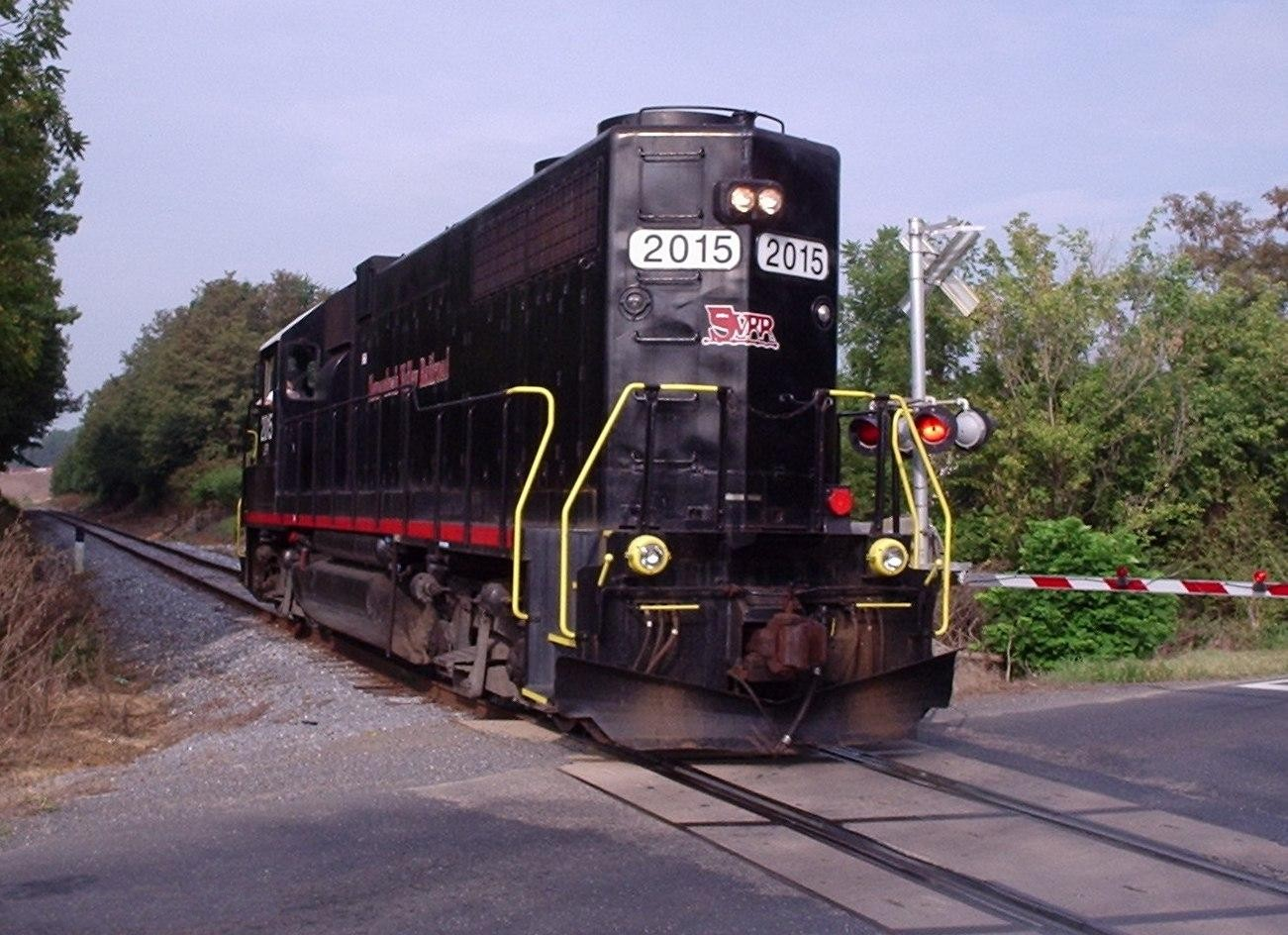
SV leased this LLPX EMD GP38 seen here at Weyer's Cave

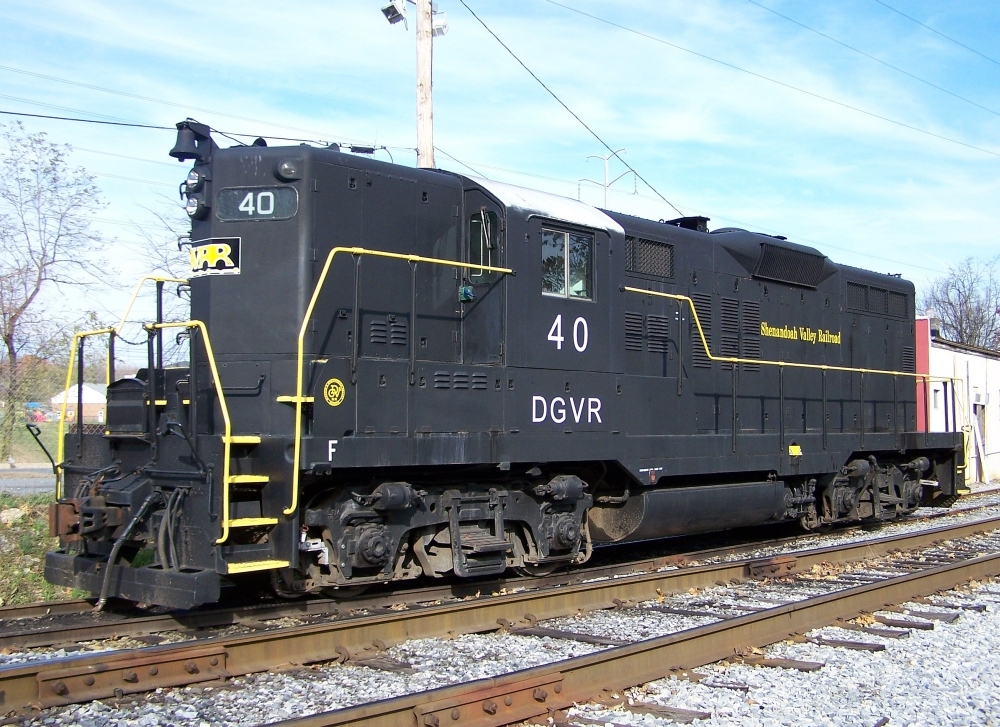
SV 40 at Staunton

== See also ==
- Shenandoah Valley Railroad (1867–1890)
