= Shenandoah Subdivision =

Railroad line between West Virginia and Virginia, USA

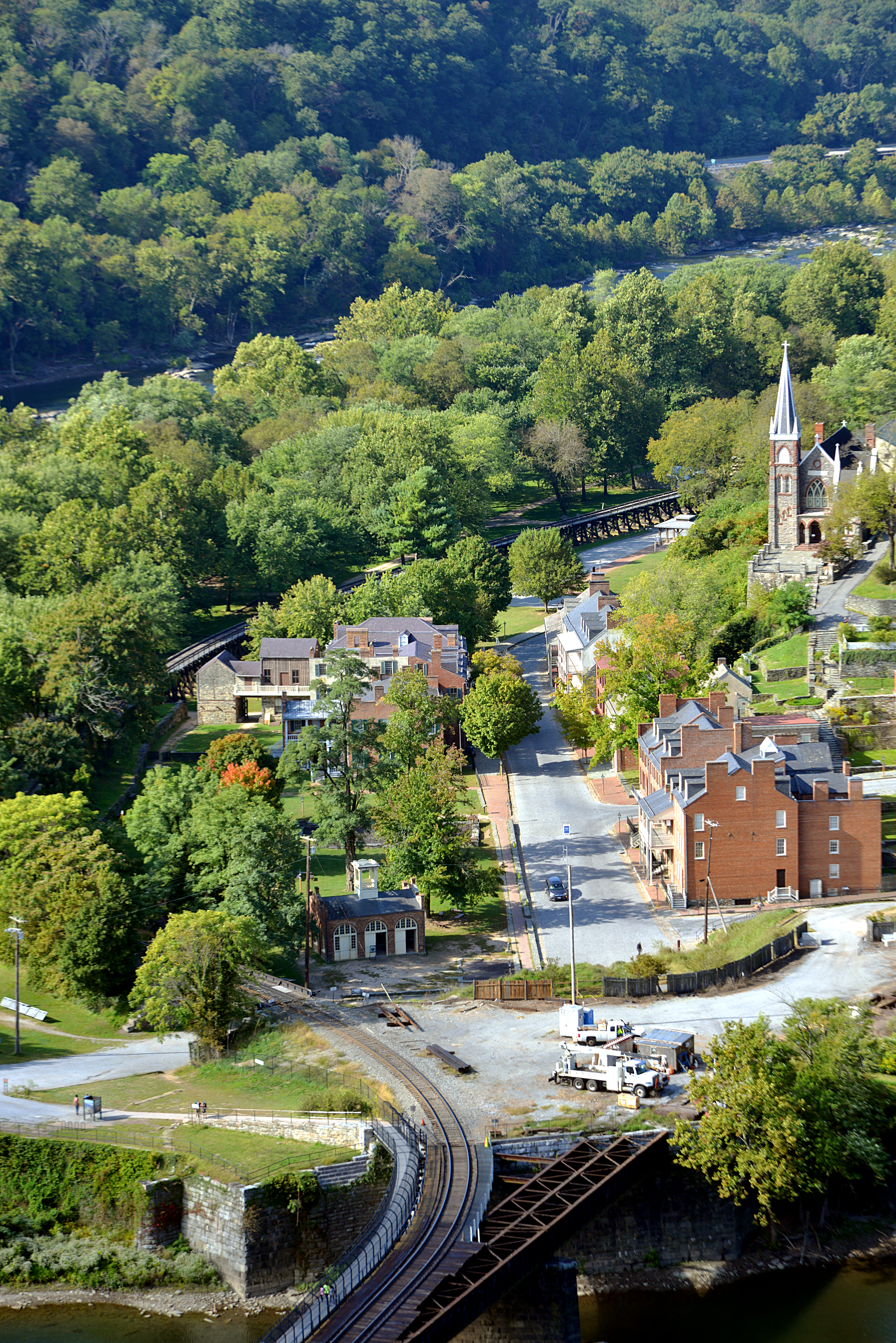
- The Shenandoah Subdivision (left) crosses the Potomac River then curves around historic Harpers Ferry

Overview
- Owner: CSX Transportation

History
- Opened: March 1836

Technical
- Line length: 51 mi (82 km)
- Track gauge: 1,435 mm (4 ft 8 1/2 in) standard gauge

The Shenandoah Subdivision, also known as the Shenandoah Valley Branch, is a railroad line in the states of Virginia and West Virginia, in the United States. It runs 51 miles (82 km) from a junction with the Cumberland Subdivision in Harpers Ferry, West Virginia, to a junction with the B-Line in Strasburg, Virginia. It was constructed between 1836 and 1870 by predecessors of the Baltimore and Ohio Railroad. Passenger service ended in 1949. Today, CSX Transportation owns and operates the line.

== History ==
The Winchester and Potomac Railroad was incorporated on April 8, 1831. Its backers were businessmen in Winchester, Virginia, who wanted to ensure that Winchester was connected to the Baltimore and Ohio Railroad (B&O), then under development. The meeting point would be Harpers Ferry, West Virginia (then located in Virginia), at the confluence of the Potomac and Shenandoah Rivers. The B&O completed its line to Harpers Ferry on December 1, 1834. The Winchester and Potomac opened its line between Winchester and Harpers Ferry in March 1836, but without a track connection to the B&O line. The B&O and Winchester and Potomac collaborated on the bridge over the Potomac, which was finally completed in 1837.

During the American Civil War the Winchester and Potomac's line was "several times destroyed and repaired." The B&O leased the Winchester and Potomac on July 1, 1867. The Winchester and Strasburg Railroad was incorporated on April 23, 1867, to extend southwest from Winchester to Strasburg, Virginia. The new line opened on June 20, 1870. The B&O leased the Winchester and Strasburg from the outset.

Under B&O control the line between Harpers Ferry and Strasburg was known as the Shenandoah Valley Branch. Passenger service over the branch ended on August 13, 1949. The Winchester and Potomac and Winchester and Strasburg, long non-operating subsidiaries of the B&O, were formally merged into CSX Transportation on December 29, 1987.

== Route ==
The northeast end of the line is at Harpers Ferry, West Virginia. It joins with the Cumberland Subdivision (the former main line of the B&O) on the Maryland side of the Potomac River. It follows the north bank of the Shenandoah River to Millville, West Virginia, and then turns west to reach Winchester. It crosses the Norfolk Southern Railway's Hagerstown District in Charles Town, West Virginia. From Winchester, the line turns south and connects with the Norfolk Southern's B-Line near Strasburg.
