= Washington Subdivision =

CSXT Washington Subdivision
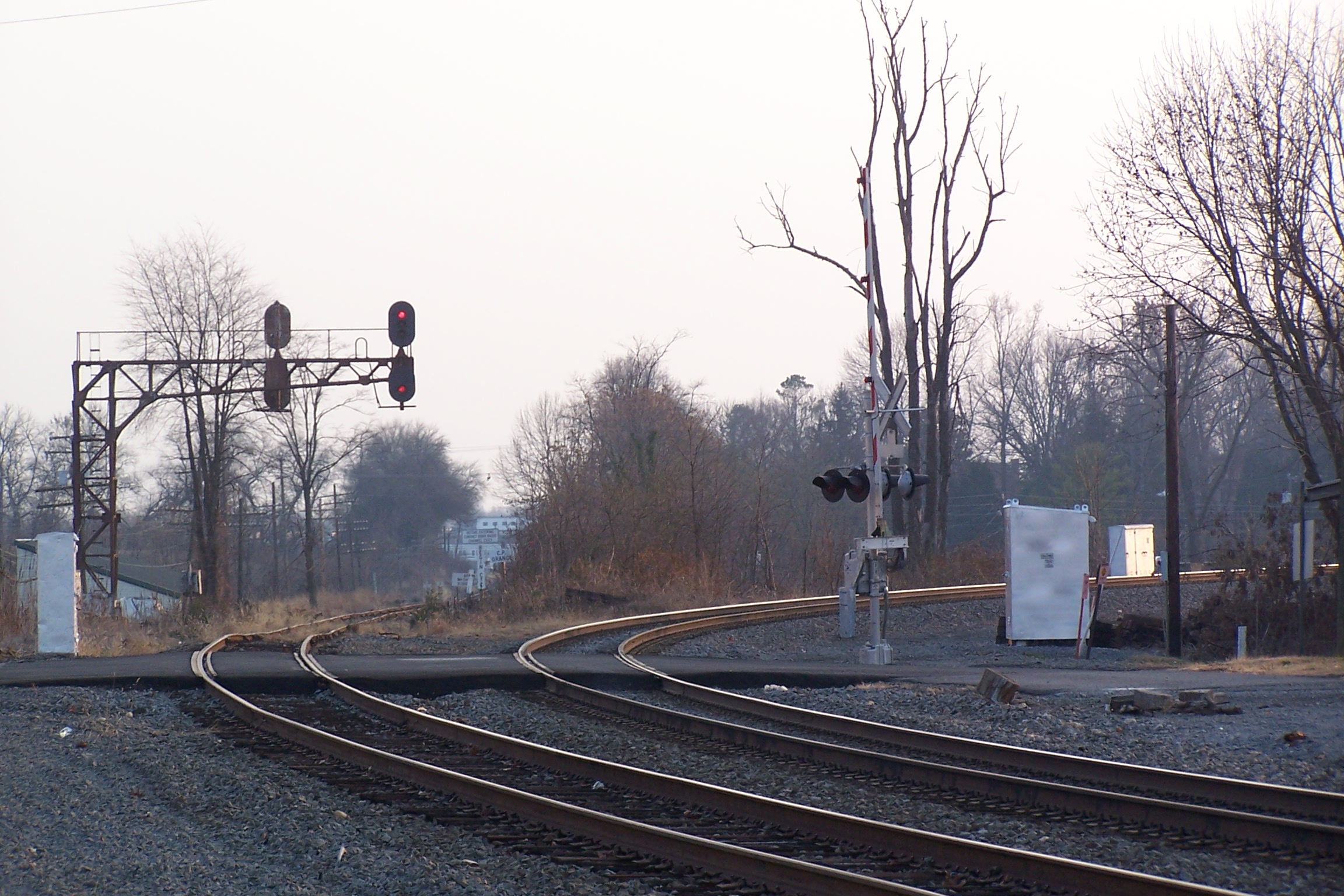
- Junction in Orange, Virginia, between the Washington Subdivision (left) and the Norfolk Southern Railway's Washington District (right).

Overview
- Locale: Virginia

Technical
- Track gauge: 1,435 mm (4 ft 8 1/2 in) standard gauge
- Electrification: No
- Length: 117 mi
- Operating speed: 40

The Washington Subdivision is a railroad line in Virginia owned by CSX Transportation and leased and operated by the Buckingham Branch Railroad.

The line is part of the BB's Richmond & Alleghany Division. The line splits from the Norfolk Southern Washington District line at Orange. The Piedmont Subdivision splits to the east at Gordonsville. It ends at Charlottesville where it once again crosses the Washington District, and the North Mountain Subdivision continues west.

Amtrak's Cardinal operates over the entire line.

== History ==
The majority of the line from Charlottesville to Gordonsville was originally constructed by the Virginia Central Railroad in the 1840s. The short portion from Gordonsville to Orange was built by the Orange and Alexandria Railroad and completed in 1854.

Through mergers, the O&A became part of the Norfolk Southern Railway and the Virginia Central became part of C&O and later CSX Transportation. CSX had trackage rights over the Norfolk Southern Railway's Washington District (former O&A) from Orange to Alexandria until those rights were terminated on March 20, 1994.

In 2004, the Buckingham Branch Railroad leased the Charlottesville–Gordonsville portion from CSX and subleased the Gordonsville–Orange piece, still owned by Norfolk Southern.

In 2019, the State of Virginia announced it would purchase the entire 186 miles (299 km) line from CSX that includes the Washington Subdivision, in order to use it for passenger service between Norfolk and Roanoke.
