= Buckingham Branch Railroad =

Railway line in Virginia, United States

Overview
- Headquarters: Dillwyn, Virginia
- Reporting mark: BB
- Locale: Virginia
- Dates of operation: 1989–present

Technical
- Track gauge: 4 ft 8 1/2 in (1,435 mm) standard gauge
- Length: 275 mi (443 km)

Other
- Website: www.buckinghambranch.com

Buckingham Branch Railroad (reporting mark BB) is a Class III short-line railroad operating over 275 miles (443 km) of historic and strategic trackage in Central Virginia. Sharing overhead traffic with CSX and Amtrak, the company's headquarters are in Dillwyn, Virginia in the former Chesapeake and Ohio Railway (C&O) station, itself a historic landmark in the community.

== History ==
Buckingham Branch Railroads' tracks are located in the heart of Central Virginia. The routing was largely constructed in the 19th century by several railroad companies. These include the Louisa Railroad, the Virginia Central Railroad, the state-owned Blue Ridge Railroad (with famous tunnels designed by state engineer Claudius Crozet and financed by the Virginia Board of Public Works), and the Covington and Ohio Railroad. All of those lines became part of Collis Huntington's Chesapeake and Ohio Railroad (later the Chesapeake and Ohio Railway) (C&O) in the 1870s, which connected the Chesapeake Bay with the valleys of the New River and Kanawha River, leading to the Ohio River Valley and thence the Mississippi River.

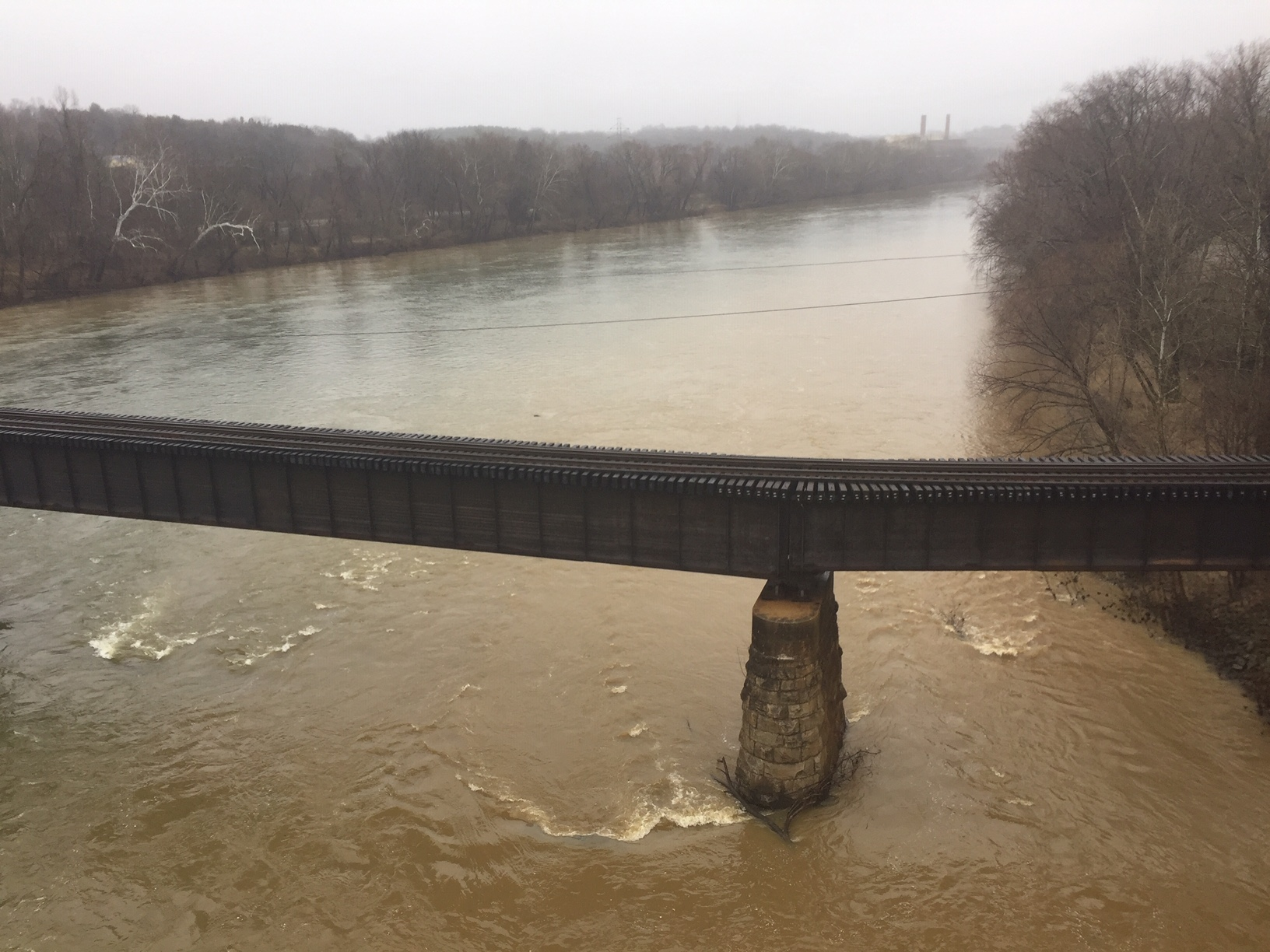
An ex-C&O bridge, owned by the BB railroad in New Canton, Virginia

In the 1880s, Major James H. Dooley's Richmond and Allegheny Railroad was built along the James River along the former right-of-way of the James River and Kanawha Canal. It too became part of the C&O, offering a lower grade pathway for coal bound from the mountains to Newport News than the older line through Staunton, Crozet's Blue Ridge Tunnel complex, and Charlottesville. Diverging from the older line at JD Cabin just east of Clifton Forge, this became known as the James River line, rejoining the old Virginia Central tracks near Main Street Station at Richmond.

The short-line branch from Bremo Bluff on the James River line into Buckingham County transported kaolin clay from the unique and rare deposits of Willis Mountain, along with timber, quarried rock, and minor amounts of general freight.

As major railroads merged and consolidated in the late 20th century, many rail lines with low traffic were abandoned, spun off into short-line railroads, or became at risk for abandonment. With lower operating costs and personalized service to shippers, many of the short-lines were able to perpetuate rail service in areas where the Class 1 railroads could not operate profitably, even when subsidized by government entities. In 2021, the line between Doswell and Clifton Forge was acquired from CSX by the Commonwealth of Virginia as part of a broader program to expand passenger service. Buckingham Branch Railroad's operations would continue.

== Buckingham Branch ==
The Buckingham Branch was founded in 1989 by retired CSX railroader Robert E. Bryant. The company began with the acquisition of a 16-mile (26 km) long branch from the CSX Transportation's James River subdivision line near Bremo Bluff on the James River south to Dillwyn in Buckingham County. The interchange with CSX is at Strathmore yard, near the junction of the former Virginia Air Line Railway. Serving small industries and quarries, the BBRR began with one locomotive and a caboose, and was staffed by Bryant's family.

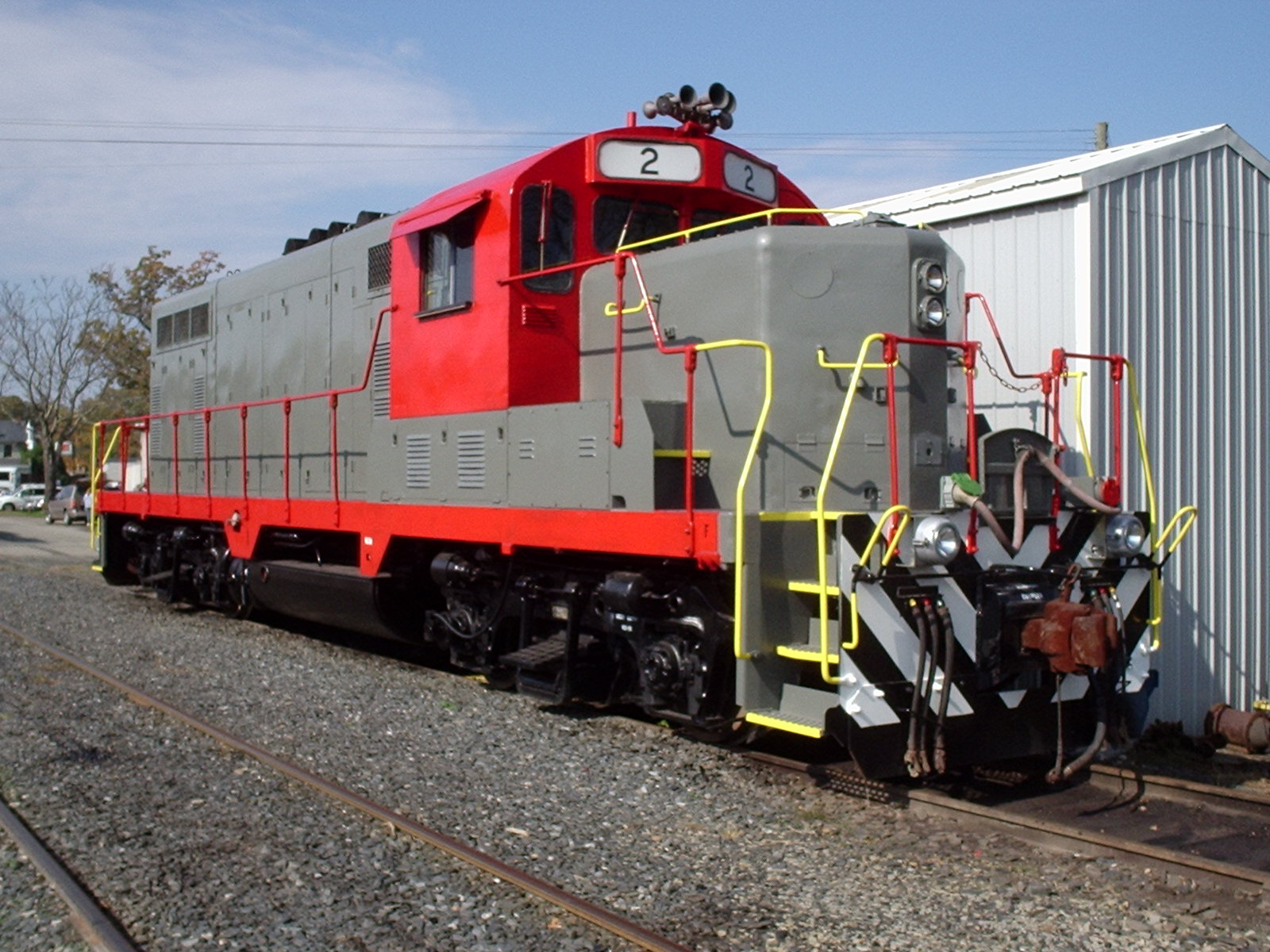
BB 2, an EMD GP16, getting a new coat of paint at Dillwyn, Virginia.

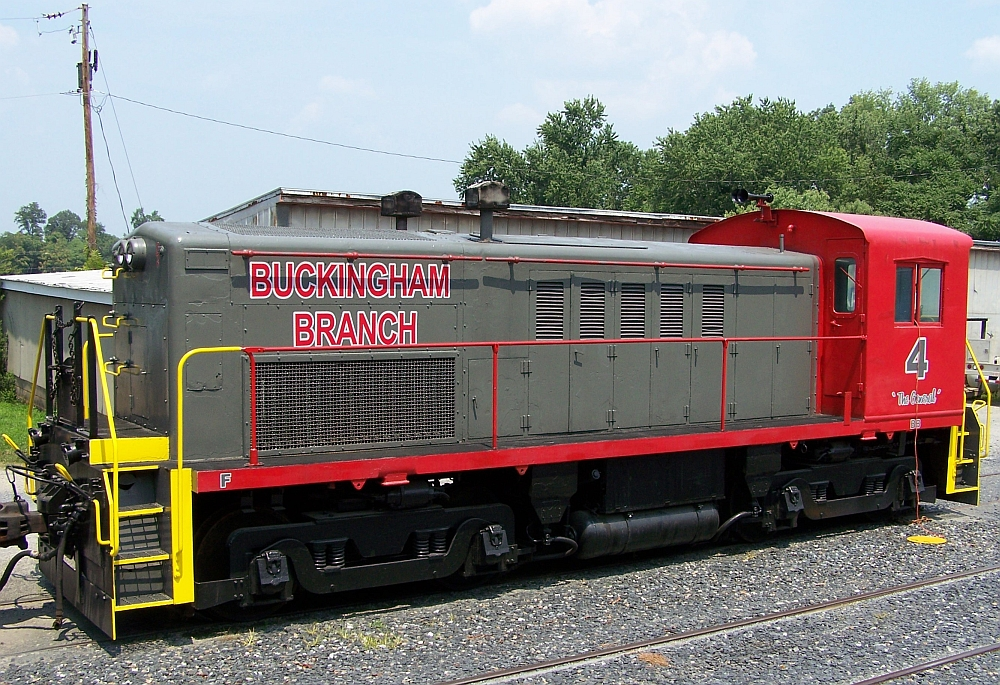
BBRR 4, an RS-4-TC, with a new coat of paint at Dillwyn, Virginia.

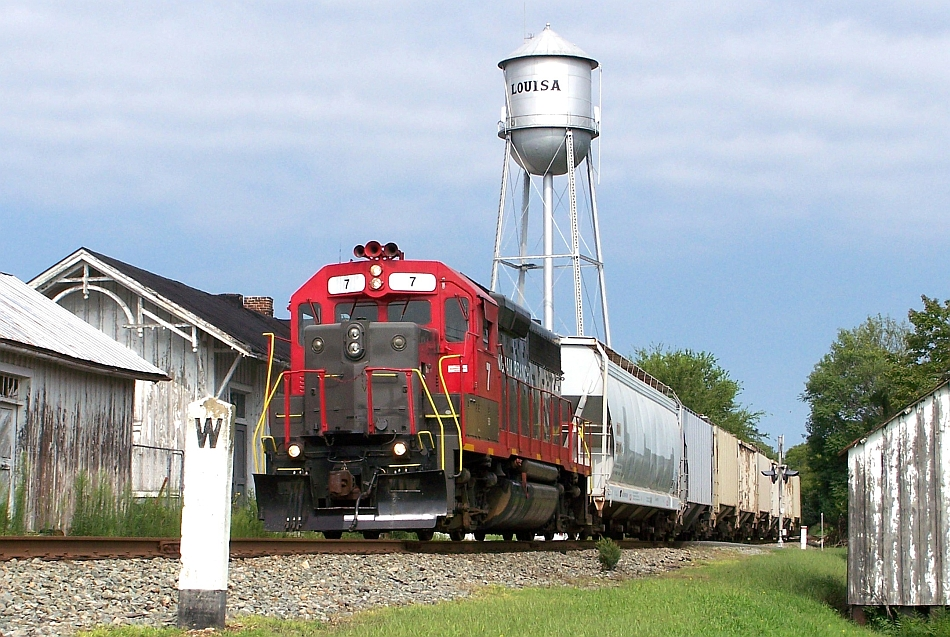
BB 7, an EMD GP40, heading east at Louisa, Virginia.

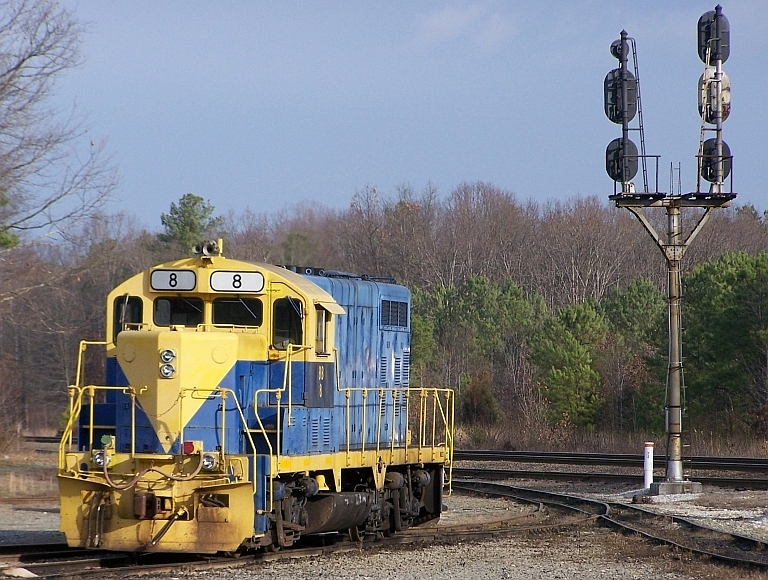
BB 8, a GP16 in GRIV paint at Doswell, Virginia.

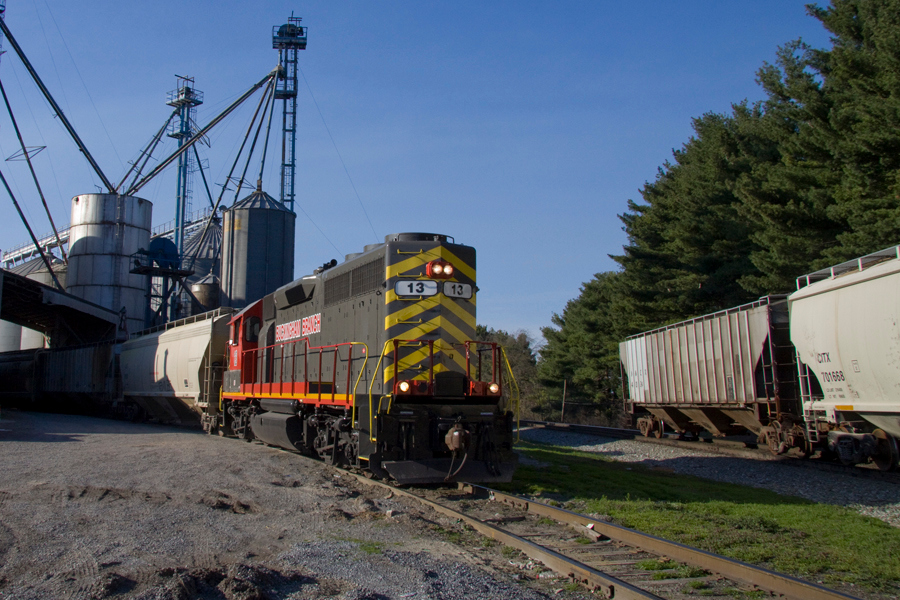
BB 13 switches Augusta CO-OP in Staunton, Virginia.

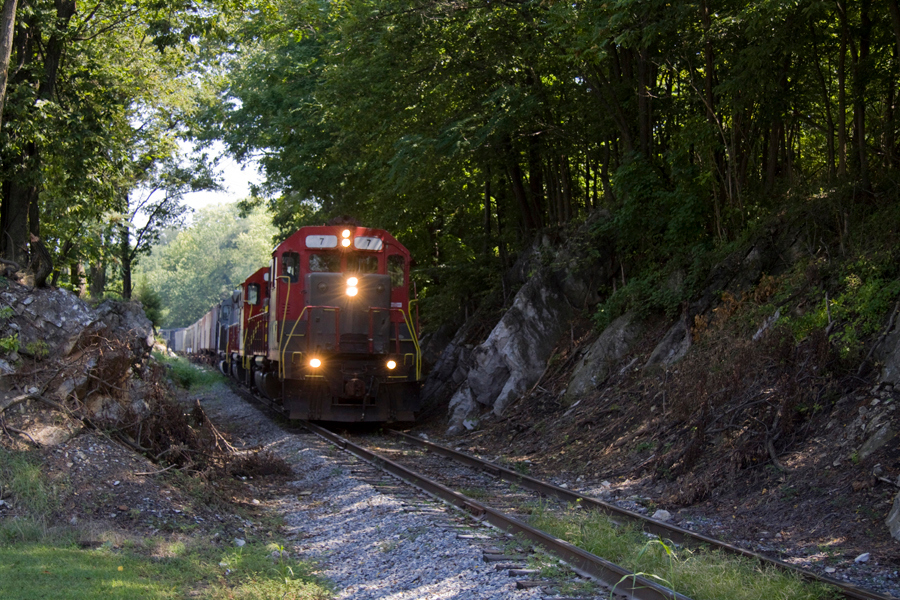
BB 7 with sisters, south on the Shenandoah Valley Railroad in Staunton, Virginia.

== Rolling stock ==
The line primarily operates EMD locomotives, including GP40 style engines as well as engines like GP16s that have since been rebuilt from other older models like GP7s that were initially purchased by the BB early on. For the most part, most engines are assigned a number composed of the railroad's initials and a new designated number they received upon joining the BB's engine roster. These numbers gradually rise in more or less incremental order with each individual engine, though some engines still retain their original paint schemes and numbers.

Engine roster:

- EMD GP7 (BB 101, formerly of the Richmond, Fredericksburg and Potomac Railroad that was eventually refurbished with its original RF&P paint scheme and number)
- x6 EMD GP16 (BB 1, BB 2, BB 3, BB 8 and BB 9, BB 8 also retained its original paint scheme for a while after purchase by the BB)
- Baldwin RS-4-TC (BB 4)
- x3 EMD GP40 (BB 5, BB 6 and BB 7)
- x2 EMD GP10 (BB 10, BB 11)
- x2 EMD GP40-3 (BB 12, BB 13)
- x5 EMD GP38-2 high hood (BB 14, BB 15, BB 16, BB 17 and BB 18)

== Virginia Scenic Railway ==
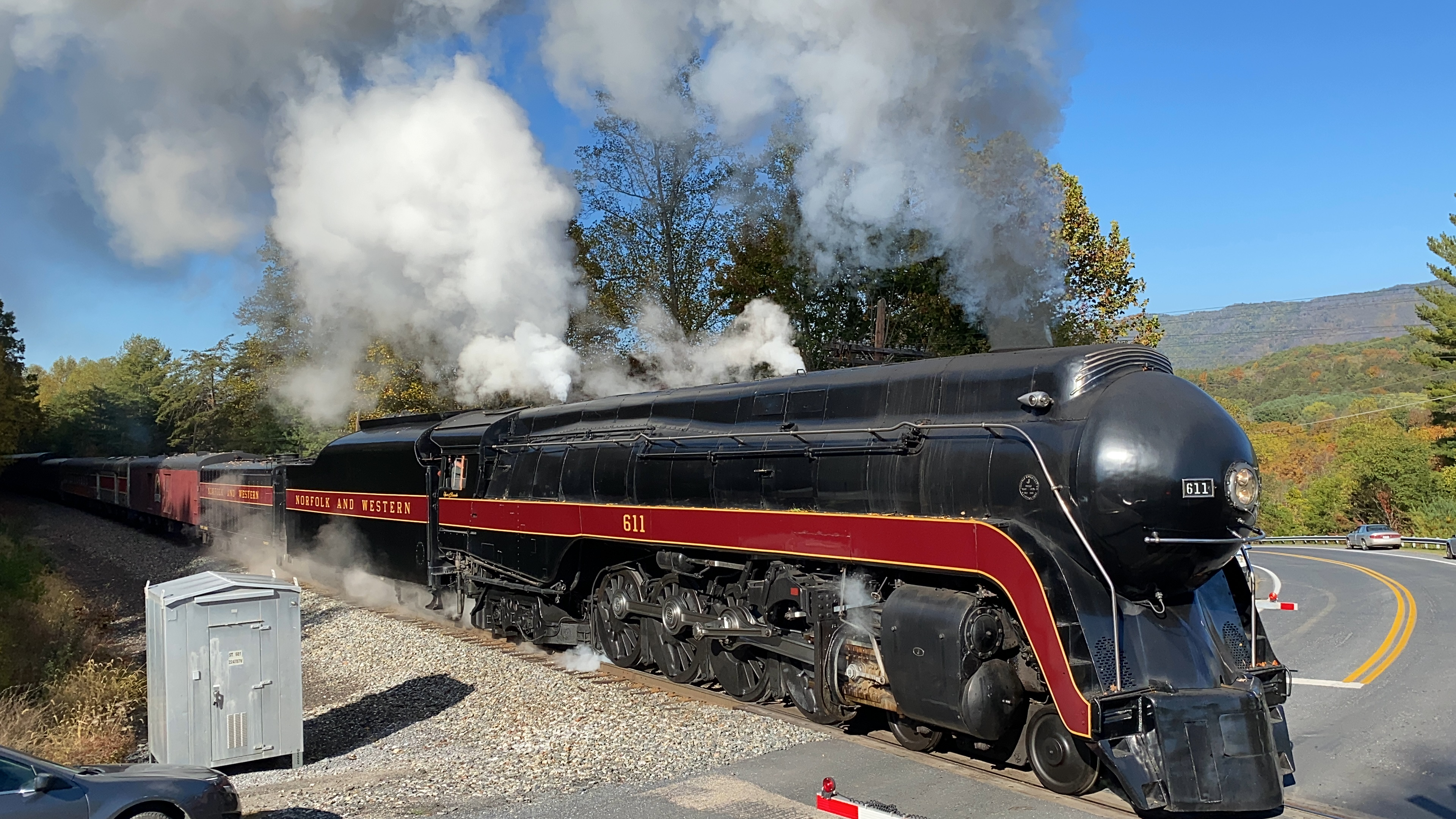
Norfolk and Western 611 goes up the North Mountain grade in Augusta Springs, Virginia with the Shenandoah Valley Limited excursion on October 13, 2023

In August 2022, the BB began the operations of the heritage Virginia Scenic Railway (VSR) with round-trip excursions from Staunton, Virginia and Louisa, Virginia. Unlike many U.S. heritage operations, which operate on lightly used branch lines, the VSR trains share track with Amtrak and CSX operations. Around autumn of 2023, ex-Norfolk and Western 4-8-4 steam locomotive No. 611, visited the VSR to haul the weekend Shenandoah Valley Limited excursions between Goshen and Staunton. No. 611 hauled the excursion train forward to Staunton with two diesels pulling the train back up to Goshen since there was no turntable or wye at Staunton for No. 611 to be turned around. Multiple seating classes are offered, including Coach, Premium Coach, First Class, and Dome class. On September 26 to October 26, 2025, No. 611 did more weekend Shenandoah Valley Limited excursions.

== Shenandoah Valley Railroad ==
For a number of years, the Buckingham Branch operated the Shenandoah Valley Railroad (SV) under contract. That short-line extends from Staunton through Augusta County north to Pleasant Valley outside Harrisonburg in Rockingham County. In 2002, the operating contract was lost to another Virginia-based short-line road, the Eastern Shore Railroad (ESHR). Today, the Shenandoah Valley Railroad, operated by the Durbin and Greenbrier Valley Railroad (DGVR), interchanges with the Buckingham Branch at Staunton.

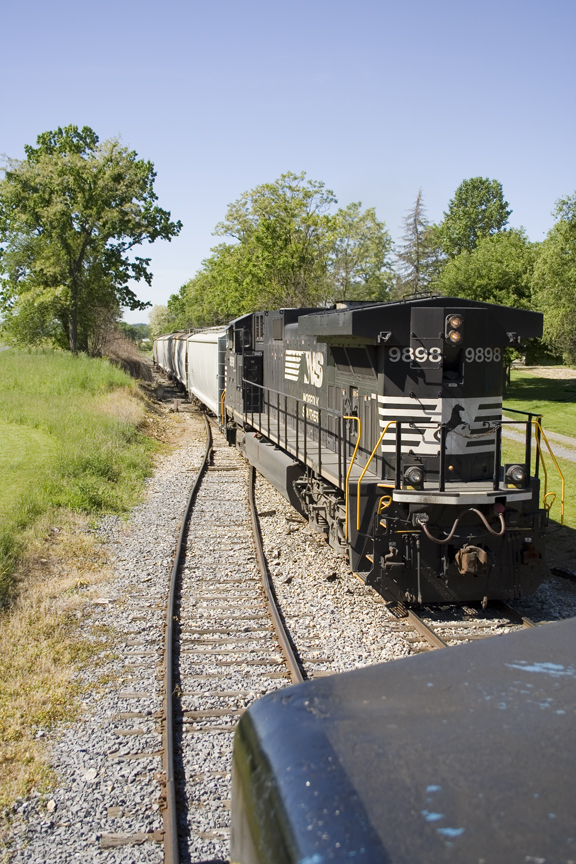
Norfolk Southern interchange at Pleasant Valley

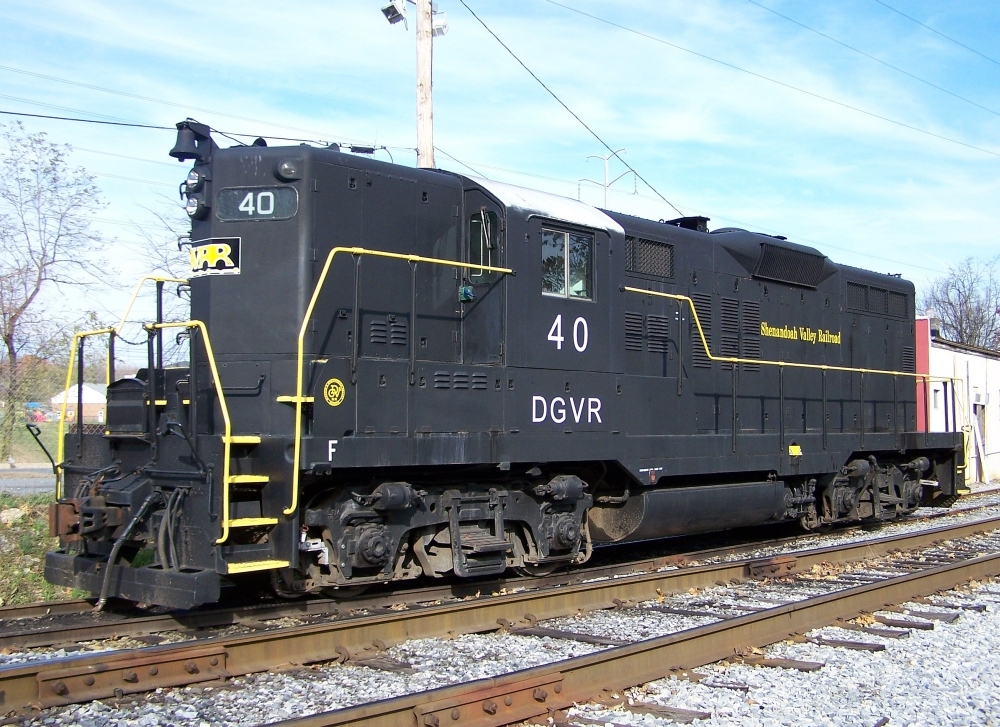
SV 40 GP9, main motive power for SVRR

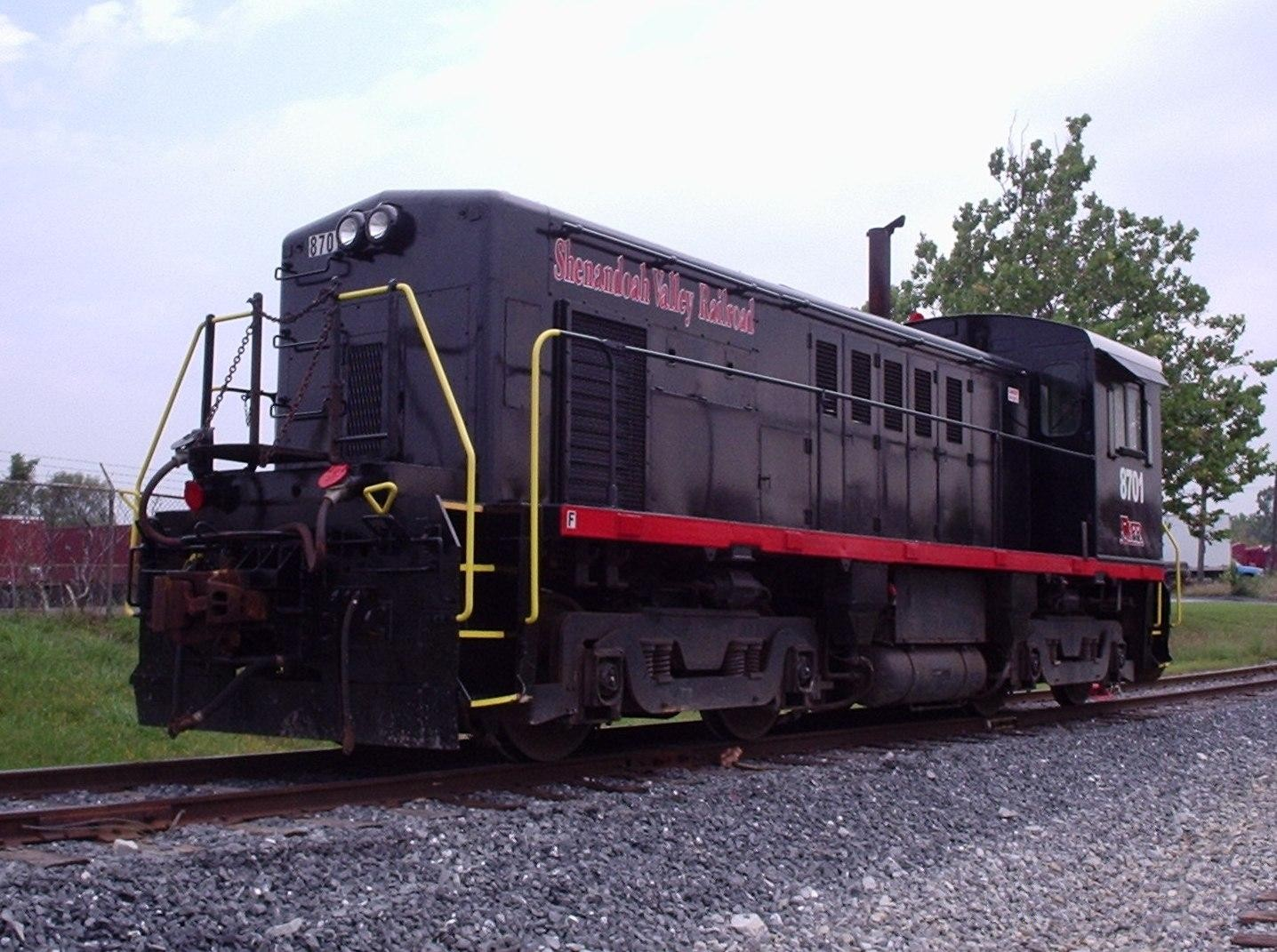
SV 8701 is an RS4TC seen at Verona, Virginia

== CSX Piedmont, Washington, North Mountain subdivisions ==
In December 2004, Buckingham Branch entered into a 20-year lease with CSX Transportation to operate 200 miles (322 km) of track in Virginia on the latter's Piedmont, Washington, and North Mountain subdivisions. Each were originally parts of the Virginia Central Railroad's line, and extend from Richmond through Doswell, Orange to Charlottesville, Virginia. From there, the line extends through the Blue Ridge Tunnel complex to Waynesboro, and Staunton to reconnect with CSX lines at Clifton Forge. The line which was the backbone of Collis Huntington's newly completed Chesapeake and Ohio Railroad in the 1870s was supplanted by a lower-grade line along the path of the former James River and Kanawha Canal in the 1880s.

Unlike the original branch in Buckingham County, the new section is leased for a 20-year period. CSX retains overhead trackage rights on the trackage leased to the Buckingham Branch, and continues its same pattern of running empty westbound coal and grain trains over the route, sometimes as many as eight a day. Train crews must contend with this fact by continually dodging CSX westbounds, as well as Amtrak's thrice-weekly Cardinal by going into the various sidings along the lines.

This new section of the expanded Buckingham Branch was dispatched by CSX from Jacksonville, Florida for the first two years; now it is dispatched by the Buckingham Branch out of Staunton.

== Expansion into Norfolk area ==
Following the end of operations by the Bay Coast Railroad on May 18, 2018, the Buckingham Branch Railroad took action to lease and operate the BCR's tracks in Little Creek, VA. A filing with the STB dated June 13, 2018 stated, in part:

Pursuant to regulations of the Surface Transportation Board ("STB") at 49 C.F.R. § l 150.42(e), Buckingham Branch Railroad Company ("BB"), a Class III rail carrier, hereby gives notice to employees of Cassatt Management, LLC d/b/a Bay Coast Railroad ("BCR") that, as soon as federal regulatory authorization permits, BB intends to lease and commence operations over lines of railroad (collectively, the "Lines") owned by: (a) Canonie Atlantic Co. ("CAC") on behalf of the Accomack-Northampton Transportation District Commission; and (b) Norfolk Southern Railway Company ("NSR"). The Lines are currently leased to, and operated by, BCR. Specifically, the CAC-owned portion of Lines (which BCR leases and operates) are as follows:

- Between milepost 95.0 at Little Creek (Virginia Beach), VA, and milepost 97.6 at Camden Heights (Norfolk), VA. The NSR-owned portion of the Lines (which BCR also leases and operates) are as follows:
- Between milepost SN 6.7 at Diamond Springs (Virginia Beach) VA and milepost SN 2.5 at Coleman Place (Norfolk), VA.

A notice of exemption to authorize a change in operator from BCR to BB will be filed with the STB on or shortly after June 13, 2018, in Docket No. FD 36202.

== Closures ==
The railroad formerly sub-leased a 2-mile section of rail between the Virginia Beach and Norfolk sections of JEB Little Creek-Fort Story that it used to serve two customers. It leased the track from Canonie Atlantic Company. The base was looking to connect its two segments, leading Canonie to file for a discontinuance of rail service to the Surface Transportation Board; they were required to file for this because of their common carrier obligation. Buckingham Branch had been under contract to serve those two customers.

== In popular culture ==
The railroad was featured in the January 2012 issue of Trains Magazine. It is referenced in the How It’s Made episode "Railway Bridge Ties", showing it crossing a curved bridge.
