= Chesapeake Western Railway =

Railroad in Virginia, United States

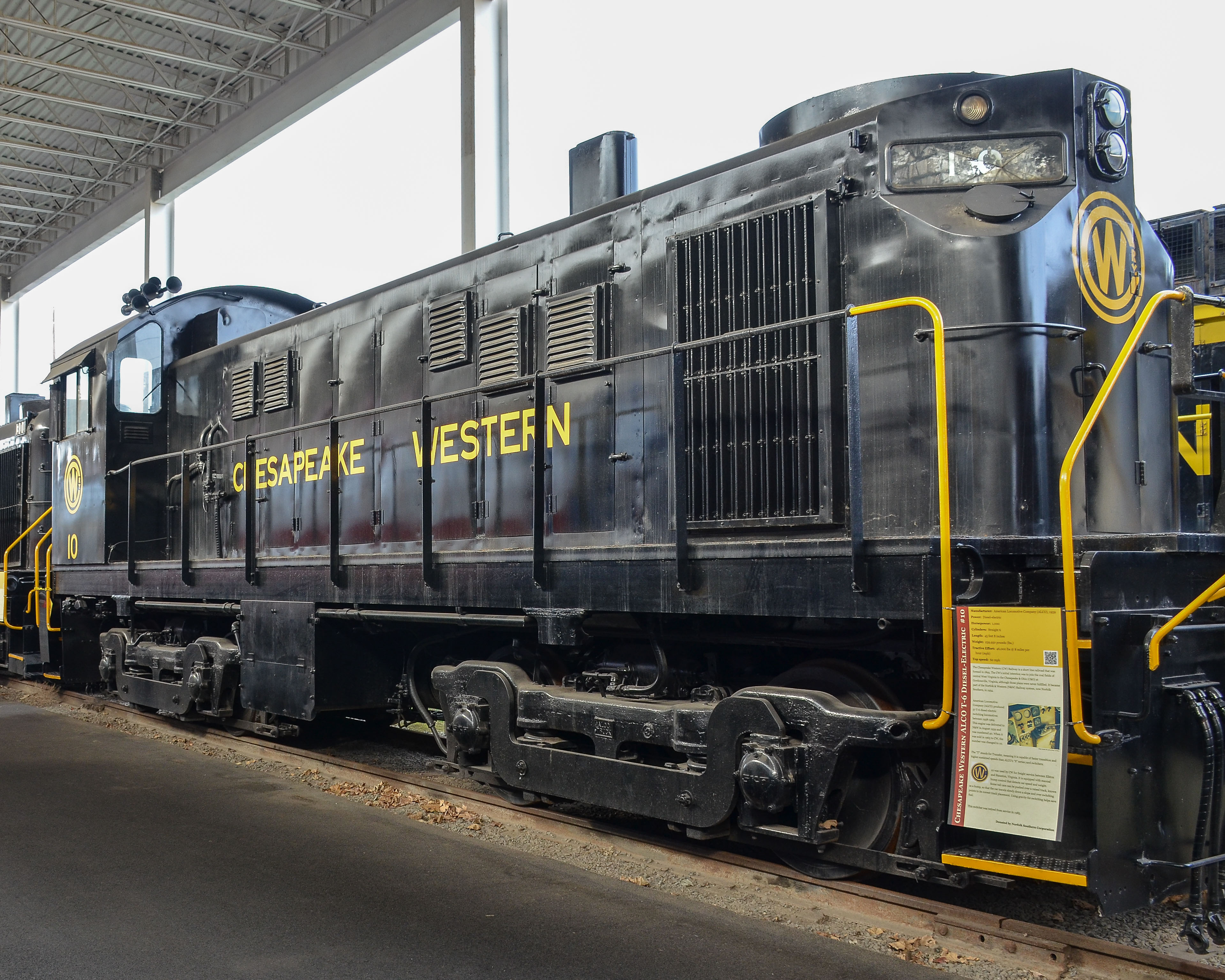
- A preserved Chesepeake Western ALCO T-6

Overview
- Operator: Norfolk Southern
- Reporting mark: CHW
- Locale: Virginia
- Dates of operation: 1896 (as Chesapeake & Western Railroad)–present

Technical
- Track gauge: 4 ft 8 1/2 in (1,435 mm) standard gauge

The Chesapeake Western Railway (reporting mark CHW) is an intrastate railroad in west-central Virginia and an operating subsidiary of the Norfolk Southern Railway. Previously an independent railroad which began operation in 1896, the line technically survives as part of Norfolk Southern. The line was locally known as the "Crooked and Weedy" and "General Robert E. Lee’s Railroad" during its independent operation.

== History ==
The history of the line dates back to 1871, where a narrow-gauge line named the Washington, Cincinnati & St. Louis Railroad was chartered in 1871 as to connect Washington, D.C. to the Midwest at Cincinnati, Ohio. Little was done with this, but in 1892 a version of the railroad was revived when several businessman chartered it with the intentions of constructing a trunk line. Nothing was done with these proposals other than grading some land. The name was changed to Chesapeake & Western Railroad when actual construction on the line began in 1895. The line officially opened on March 23, 1896 in Harrisonburg, and went both east and west. In 1901, a businessman named W.E.D. Stokes bought the line and renamed it to the Chesapeake Western Railway. To the west, Bridgewater, Virginia was the original terminus, but the line was extended to Stokesville, a company town, by 1901. In 1933 the line was cut back to Bridgewater due to timber around the area drying up, and later to Dayton, Virginia. To the east the line reached Elkton by 1896, where the line's main yard and shops were constructed. The line was experiencing a downturn in the 1930s, but was revived when bought by Donald W. Thomas on September 1,1938, who was able to purchase more modern equipment. By the mid-1940s, the Chesapeake Western operated a total of 53.5 miles in the Shenandoah Valley and interchanges with the C&O, N&W, and Southern Railways. On January 1, 1943 the railway purchased some of the former Baltimore and Ohio Railroad's tracks from Harrisonburg, Virginia to Lexington, Virginia but abandoned the route from Staunton, Virginia, to Lexington, Virginia, due to a lack of freight traffic.

The Norfolk & Western purchased the Chesapeake Western in 1954, ending its status as an independent railroad. The Chesapeake Western survived as a separate entity from Norfolk & Western for a several years until the merger of the Norfolk & Western Railway and the Southern Railway in the 1980s, becoming part of Norfolk Southern. Norfolk Southern upgraded the route after buying the railway, installing continuous welded rail over much of the route and replacing the bridge at Elkton which was destroyed by a flood in 1985. The shops at Elkton were razed in 1989.

A historical marker was placed near the location of Stokesville at Stokesville Community Church to commemorate the history of the town, although most of it was destroyed by natural disasters in 1949. At least one Chesepeake Western locomotive has been preserved and is displayed at the Virginia Museum of Transportation. In addition, the old Chesapeake Western Station remains standing in downtown Harrisonburg.

== Current operations ==
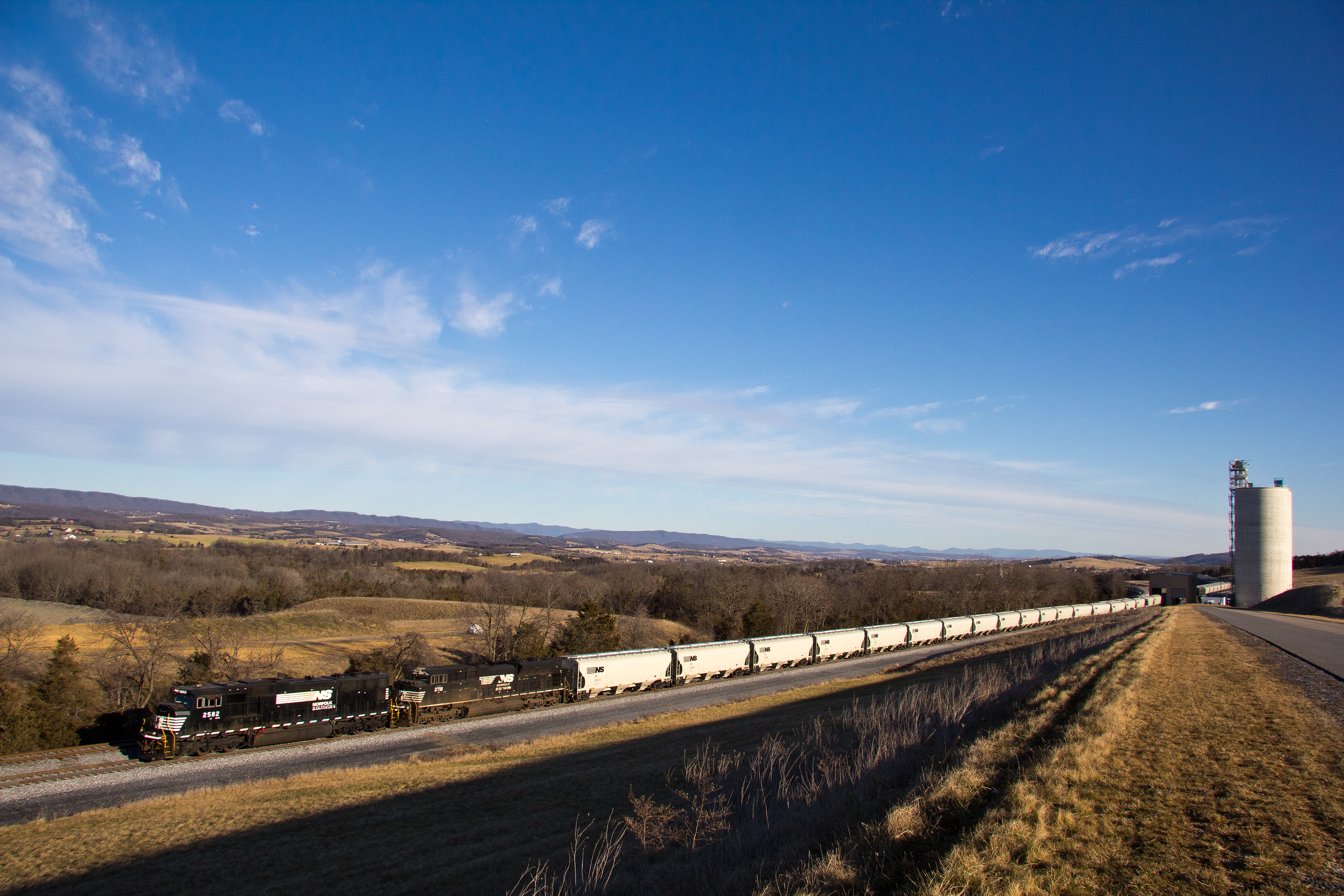
A Norfolk Southern Railway grain train on the Chesapeake Western Railway in Linville, Virginia in 2012.

As a wholly owned subsidiary of Norfolk Southern (NS), the Chesapeake Western is used by NS trains hauling agricultural products, paper, and other manufactured items. It consists of two lines that intersect in Harrisonburg:

- From Dayton east through Harrisonburg to a connection with the NS Hagerstown–Roanoke main line at Elkton
- From Broadway south through Harrisonburg to Pleasant Valley, where there is an interchange with the Shenandoah Valley Railroad to Staunton
