= Willis Mountain =

Mountain in Virginia, United States

Highest point
- Elevation: 353 m (1,158 ft)
- Prominence: 350 m (1,150 ft)
- Coordinates: 37°28.3439′N 78°27.4920′W

Geography
- Location: Buckingham County, Virginia, United States

Willis Mountain is a monadnock rising from the rolling hills of the Piedmont province of Buckingham County, Virginia, a little east of the geographic center of the state. Willis Mountain is located about 6 mi (9.7 km) southeast of Buckingham, Virginia, and 18 mi (29 km) northwest of Farmville, Prince Edward County. In a general north-south direction, U. S. Highway 15 borders the western side of the mountain.

Willis Mountain consists of a narrow ridge that is about 2 mi (3.2 km) long, with steep rocky slopes. Near its center, it is broken into two segments by a low saddle. Southward of the saddle, this ridge rises to an elongated knob known locally as Round Mountain with an elevation of 1,150 ft (350 m). Northward of the saddle, this ridge rises to an elevatione of 1,159 ft (353 m), which is about 500 ft (150 m) above the adjacent valley floor. Second-growth timber, mostly hardwood and some pine, cover the sides of Willis Mountain. A fire lookout tower occupies the highest point of Willis Mountain.

Willis Mountain is well known as the site of a large deposit of kyanite quartzite that has been actively mined for kyanite for decades. This deposit is the largest of five large kyanite deposits that occur within a 7 mi (11 km) wide belt known as the Willis Mountain kyanite-quartzite belt.

== Physiography ==
The landscape of Buckingham County surrounding Willis Mountain is typical of the Piedmont Plateau within Virginia. The landscape consists of gently rolling broad, flat-topped ridges separated by narrow valleys. A low relief network of streams within these valleys allow for rapid drainage. A deep mantle of highly weathered bedrock, called saprolite underlies the surface, except where the larger streams have carved deep valleys. Except monadnocks like, Willis Mountain, the ridge crests are consistently uniform in elevation, ranging from 450 ft (140 m) high in the eastern portion of the area to 550–600 ft (170–180 m) high in the eastern portion of the area. Willis Mountain rises above the level of the surrounding ridges as a solitary monadnock to an elevation of 1,159 ft (353 m).

Willis Mountain rises above the surrounding countryside because the massive deposits of kyanite quartzite underlying it are highly resistant to weathering in the regional climate. Unlike the metamorphic bedrock underlying the surrounding countryside, the kyanite quartzite lacks the thick cover of saprolite. Instead, the kyanite quartzite characteristically is well exposed as ledges, where it is thinly foliated with low dips, to forming bold crags and cliffs of Willis Mountain. These weathered ledges, crags, and cliffs are rough and jagged because the grains of quartz are more easily eroded than the large crystals of kyanite. The ledges, crags, and cliffs exhibit deeply etched pits and furrows because of differential weathering along foliation, joints, and linear rock structures. The weathering of pyrite within the kyanite quartzite has heavily stained and impregnated the exposed bedrock with limonite.

== Geology ==
The western limb of north-south trending Whispering Creek anticline underlies Willis Mountain. It and Round Mountain are supported by a westward dipping stratiform layer of kyanite quartzite within the west limb. The kyanite quartzite is overlain and underlain by quartz-muscovite schists. The schists are enveloped by biotite-amphibole gneiss of the Cambrian Chopawamsic Formation. An eastward dipping layer of kyanite quartzite within the east limb of the Whispering Creek anticline forms a lower and longer ridge that lies east of Willis Mountain.

The kyanite quartzite and associated schist and gneiss consist of volcaniclastic sediments and volcanic rocks that have been altered by amphibolite grade metamorphism under pressure as high as 6.5 kb and temperatures as high as 600 °C. The interpretation of isotopic, trace element, and other data and mineral equilibria suggest that the kyanite quartzite was created by the metamorphism of highly altered intermediate volcanic rocks. Prior to metamorphism, the original volcanic rocks had been hydrothermally altered by acidic fluids (pH 2 to 4) at temperatures between 100 and 200 °C under mildly oxidizing conditions. Alumina and silica also had been residually enriched by rock hydrolysis during the hydrothermal alteration.

The kyanite deposits of Willis Mountain was first reported by David Campbell in 1839. These deposits were later investigated by the Virginia Geological Survey in 1932 and by the US Bureau of Mines in 1949 and 1950. The Kyanite Mining Corporation purchased the main ridge of Willis Mountain and began mining the south end of it in 1957.
