= Pleasant Valley, Rockingham County, Virginia =

Pleasant Valley, Virginia
- Unincorporated community
- Location within Virginia Location within the United States
- Coordinates: 38°23′05″N 78°53′50″W
- Country: United States
- State: Virginia
- County: Rockingham
- Elevation: 1,250 ft (380 m)
- Time zone: UTC-5 (Eastern (EST))
  - Summer (DST): UTC-4 (EDT)
- GNIS feature ID: 1493437

Pleasant Valley is an unincorporated community in Rockingham County, Virginia, United States.

== Geography ==
Pleasant Valley is located 4.7 miles (7.6 km) south-southeast of Harrisonburg.

Location of Pleasant Valley within the Rockingham County
