= Orange and Alexandria Railroad =

Defunct railroad in Virginia, United States

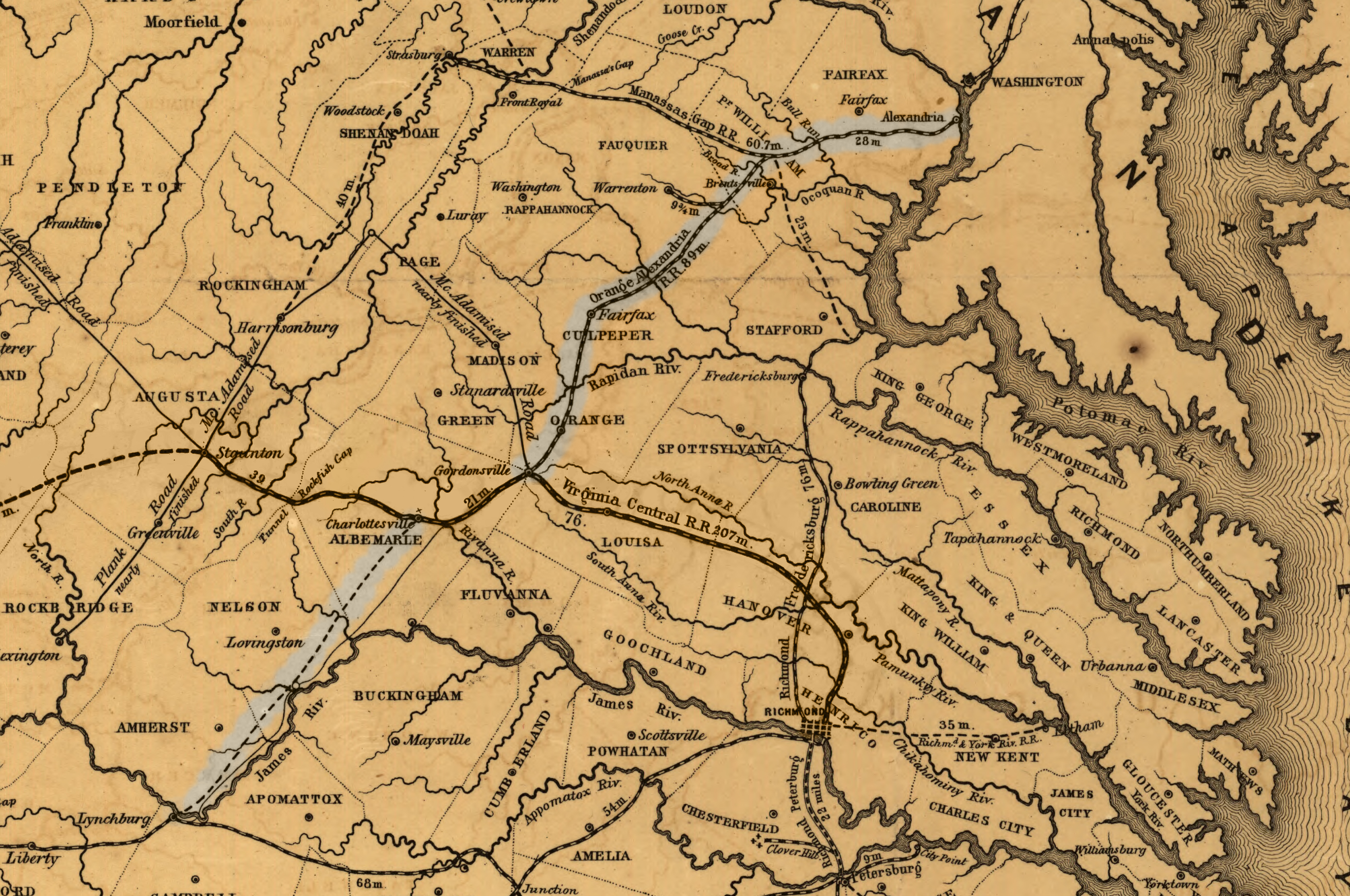
- 1852 map showing the O&A

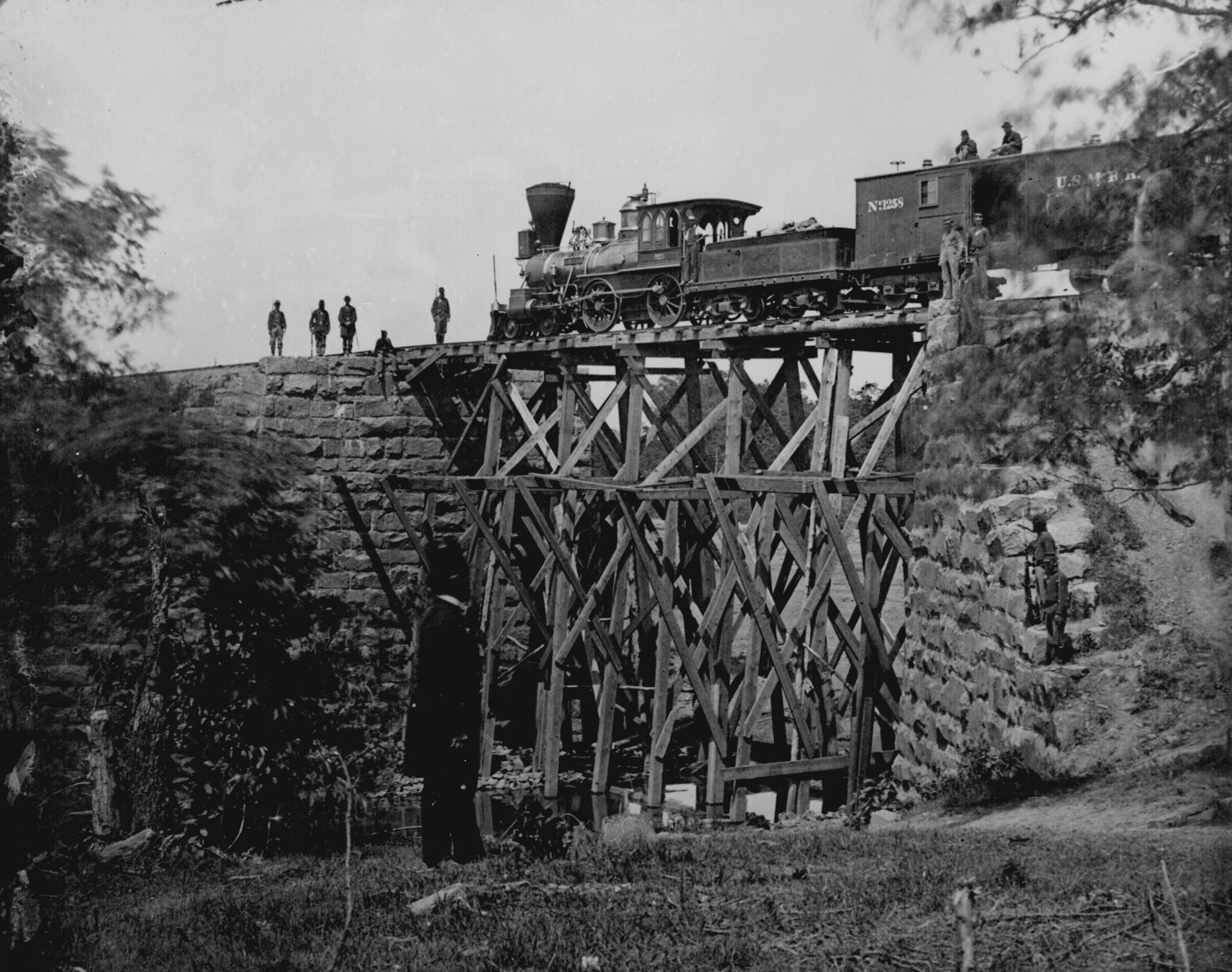
- The engine "Firefly" on a trestle of the Orange and Alexandria Railroad.

Overview
- Locale: Virginia
- Dates of operation: 1848–1867
- Successor: Orange, Alexandria and Manassas Railroad

Technical
- Track gauge: 4 ft 8 1/2 in (1,435 mm) standard gauge
- Previous gauge: Originally built as 4 ft 8 in (1,422 mm)

The Orange and Alexandria Railroad (O&A) was a railroad in Virginia, United States. Chartered in 1848, it eventually extended from Alexandria to Gordonsville, with another section from Charlottesville to Lynchburg. The road played a crucial role in the American Civil War, saw the first of many mergers in 1867, and eventually became an important part of the modern-day Norfolk Southern rail system.

== Antebellum period ==
The Virginia General Assembly issued a charter to the O&A on May 28, 1848, to run from Alexandria to Gordonsville. Construction began in 1850 and was completed in April 1854, when it connected with the Virginia Central Railroad in Orange County. Its longtime president was John S. Barbour Jr., a Virginia lawyer, part-time delegate and son of U.S. Representative John Strode Barbour.

In 1854, the General Assembly granted the O&A the right to build southward from Charlottesville to Lynchburg. O&A paid for trackage rights over Virginia Central tracks from Gordonsville to Charlottesville. In 1860, the southern extension was completed, including lucrative connections to the Virginia and Tennessee Railroad and the South Side Railroad. The O&A also connected with the Manassas Gap Railroad (chartered in 1850), at Tudor Hall (today named Manassas for this junction) which gave it access to the Shenandoah Valley.

The railroad boosted Virginia commerce. Farmers from Virginia's Piedmont region, and later, the Shenandoah Valley could more cheaply ship their products, produce, and goods to the markets of Washington, D.C., and Richmond, and to ocean-going vessels berthed at the Potomac River port of Alexandria. Alexandria, Richmond, and Lynchburg also became manufacturing centers. Passengers could travel from Washington to Lynchburg in eight hours instead of enduring a three-day stagecoach journey.

== American Civil War ==
1861 barricades on Alexandria's Duke Street, erected to protect the Orange and Alexandria Railroad from Confederate cavalry

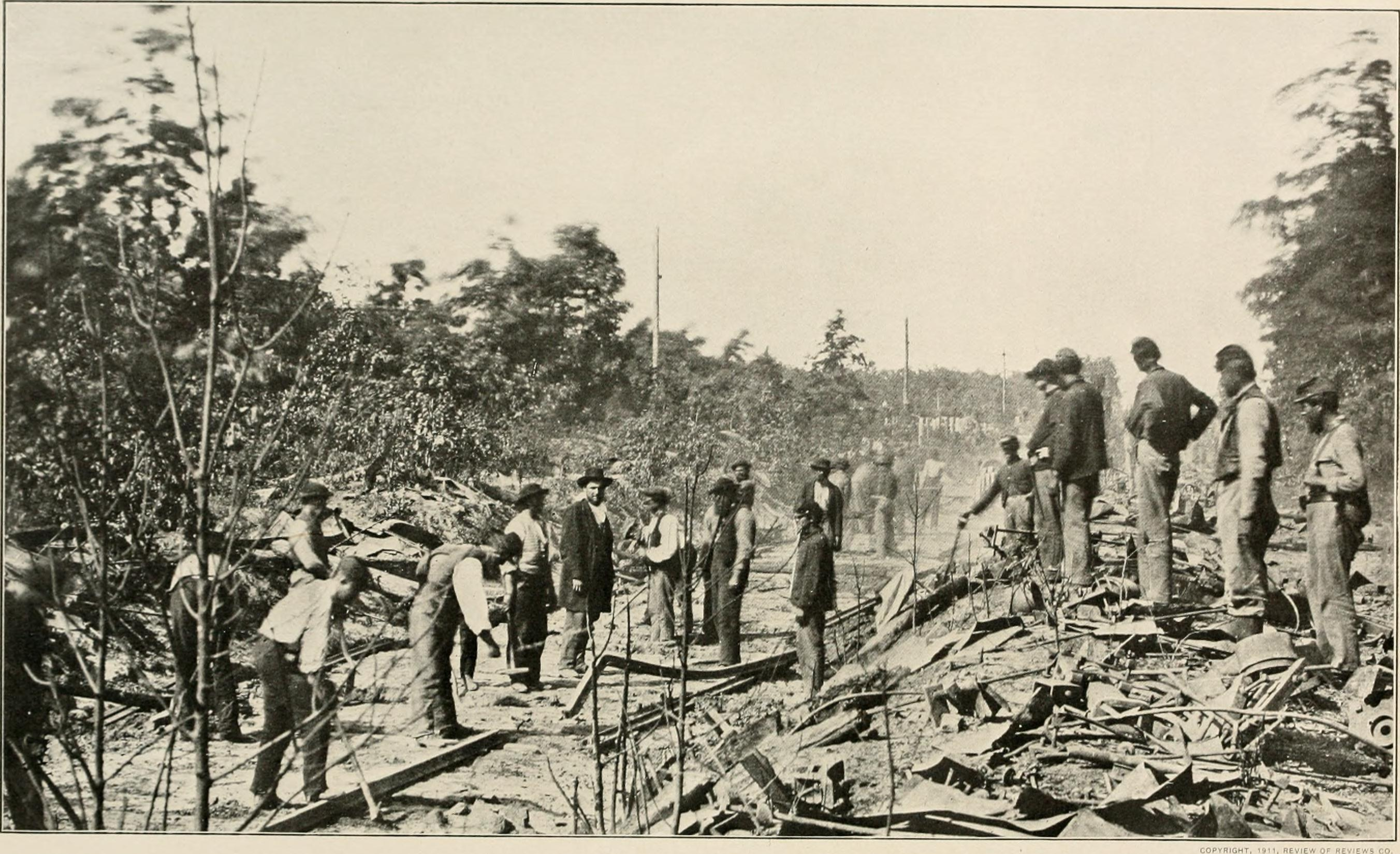
Repairing damage after a Confederate cavalry raid

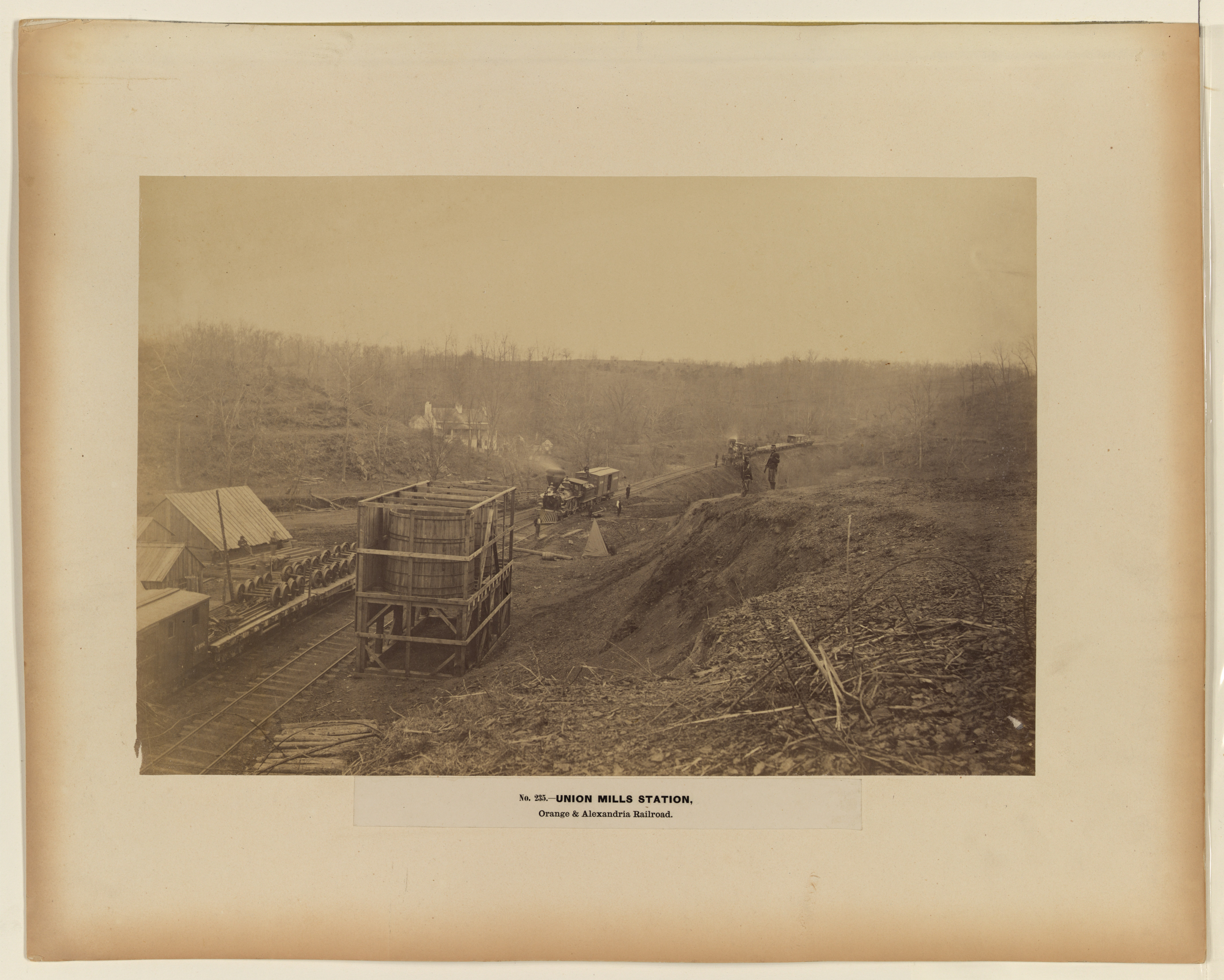
Union Mills Station

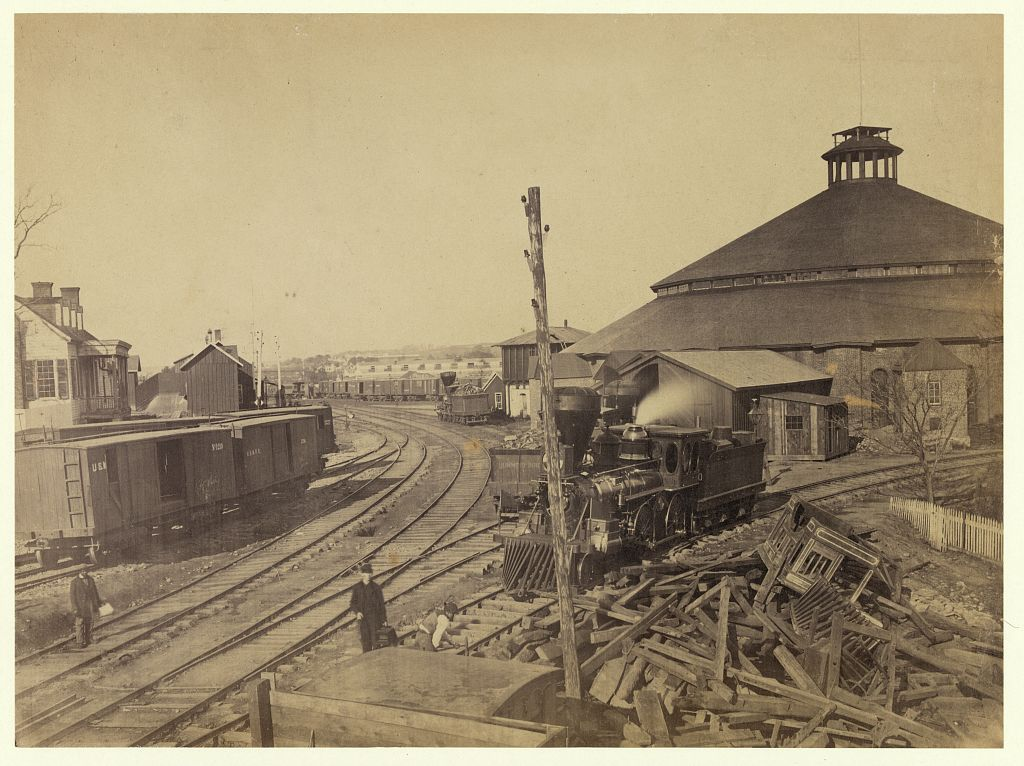
The O&A depot and roundhouse in Alexandria were located in today's Carlyle/Eisenhower East area

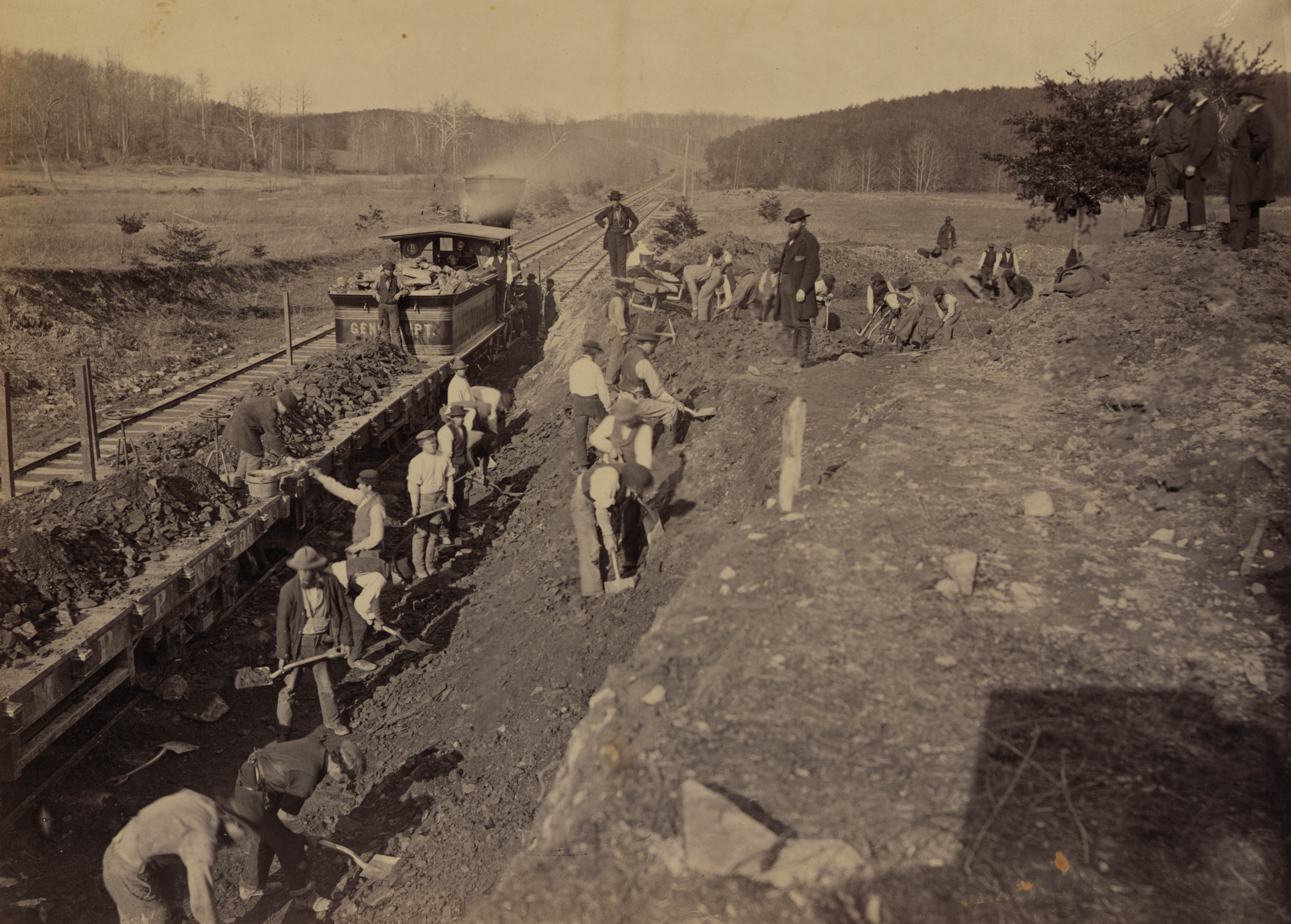
The locomotive, "General Haupt" is being used for work detail. Standing on the bank is USMRR Supt for the O & A railroad, John Henry Devereux. He and his "boss" Herman Haupt are often confused. Devereux is slightly more portly than the very slim Haupt. Haupt USUALLY wore his BG uniform. This image is of work being done on a "Y" on the O & A. Possibly close to Devereux Station in 1863

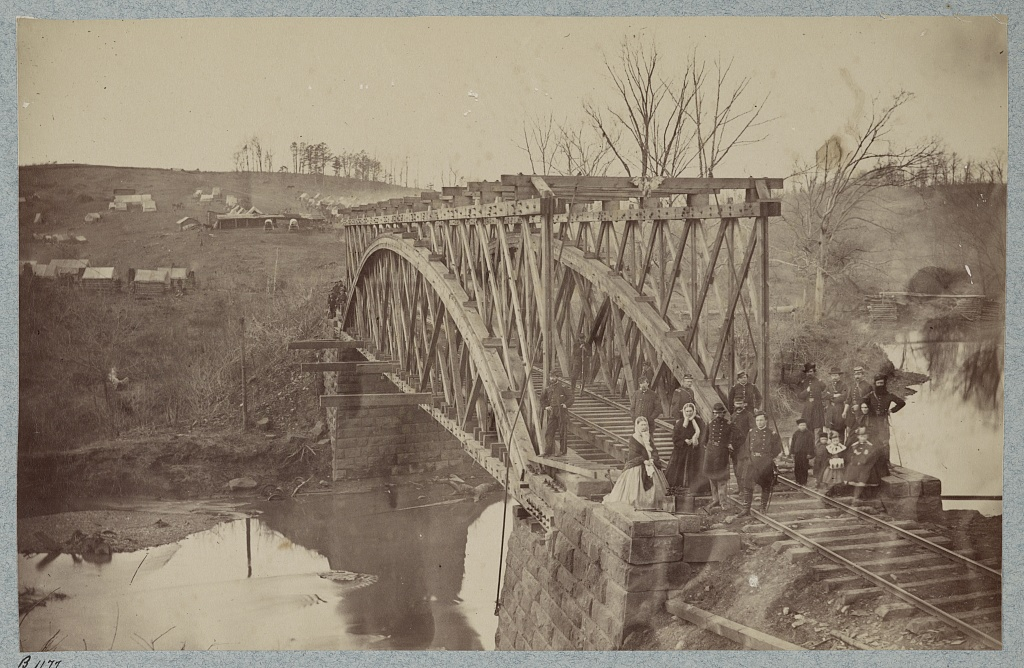
Orange & Alexandria Railroad Bridge over Bull Run (ca. 1863)

The O&A was strategically important during the Civil War (1861–1865) and was repeatedly fought over and wrecked. In connection with the Virginia Central, it was the only rail link between the belligerents' capitals at Washington and Richmond. An 1861 Union Army attempt to gain control of Manassas Junction led to the First Battle of Bull Run, and the junction traded hands numerous times during the war. Confederate Maj. Gen. Thomas J. "Stonewall" Jackson attacked it in the Battle of Manassas Station Operations to draw the Union into the 1862 Second Battle of Bull Run. The 1863 Battle of Brandy Station and Second Battle of Rappahannock Station were also fought near the railroad line.

== Reconstruction ==
The railroad entered Reconstruction in dire shape, with much of its track ripped up and most of its rolling stock destroyed. However, Barbour rebuilt the railroad with the help of various politically connected financiers and his brother-in-law J.S.B. Thompson. In 1867, the O&A merged with the Manassas Gap Railroad (led by Edward Carrington Marshall) to become the Orange, Alexandria and Manassas Railroad.

After the Panic of 1873, the railroad was consolidated into the Virginia Midland Railway, which was controlled by the Baltimore and Ohio Railroad. It later became part of the Richmond and Danville Railroad, which went bankrupt in the Panic of 1893. The following year it was merged into the Southern Railway.

A cutoff between Orange and Charlottesville was incorporated in 1876 as the Charlottesville and Rapidan Railroad and opened in 1880. The Southern Railway acquired the line in 1914.

== Modern times ==
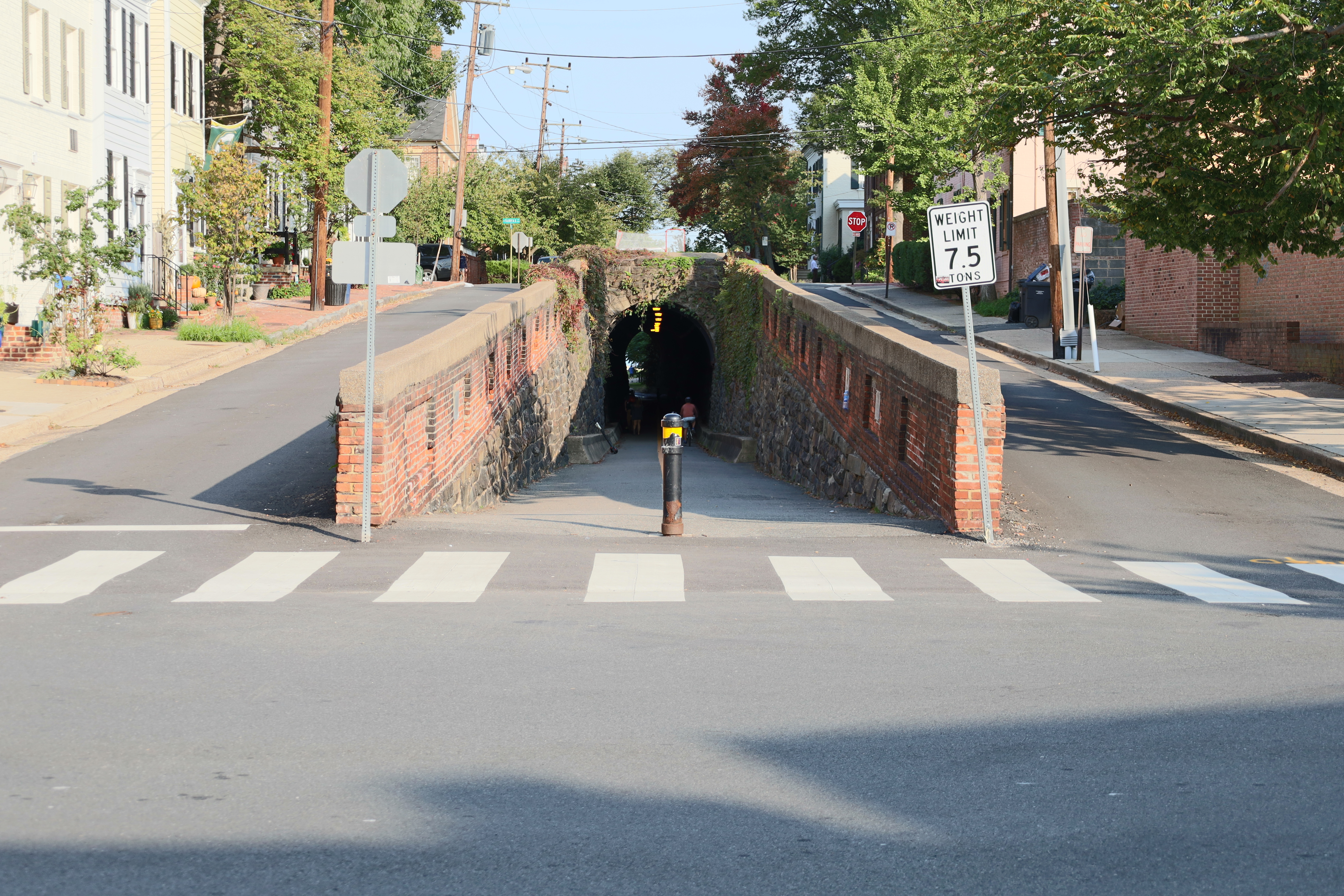
The Wilkes Street Tunnel near the railroad's former eastern terminus is now a pedestrian tunnel.

Most of the O&A right-of-way is now the Washington District line of the Norfolk Southern Railway. The main exceptions are a short segment between Orange and Gordonsville, which is part of the similarly named Washington Subdivision of the Buckingham Branch Railroad; and the easternmost portion that traveled through Old Town Alexandria to its waterfront, which no longer exists aside from the Hoofs Run Bridge and the Wilkes Street Tunnel.

Parts of the former O&A right-of-way are also used by Amtrak and Virginia Railway Express (VRE).

=== Wilkes Street Tunnel ===
The O&A built the first transportation tunnel in Virginia: the Wilkes Street Tunnel in Alexandria, Virginia, opened in 1851 but completed in 1856. Located just a few hundred yards west of the Potomac River, it connected the wharves to the rest of the line.

The area around the tunnel became known as "Tunneltown", part of an African-American neighborhood called "Hayti". By the mid-20th century. it was a shantytown and squatter's haven known as "Owens Beach". Revival efforts began in 1968 when an old row tenement on the NE corner of Royal and Wilkes was turned into luxury apartments called Tunnel Flats.

As wharf traffic declined and Alexandria became more suburban, daily trains through the tunnel decreased to two a day. One, the Southern train to the PEPCO plant, last ran on November 25, 1969. This was a symbolic run, made at walking speed with children hanging from the train and dignitaries on hand. An employee walked in front of the locomotive as it went down Union Street, stopping to let shoppers and diners move cars that were parked on the tracks. The other train, to the Robinson Terminal at Duke Street, ceased in 1974, and most of the tracks were pulled up in mid-October 1975. In 2019, during the construction of Robinson Landing on Union Street, some tracks were found buried at that site and they were installed in the sidewalk along the south side of Union from Wolfe to Duke Street.

By 1980, the city was seeking federal funding to turn the tunnel into a bike trail, which was done before 1999. In 2003, the city added a crosswalk to Union Street to connect the tunnel to the park on the other side. In 2007-2008, the tunnel was refurbished, receiving steel reinforcement ribs, more and brighter lighting, drainage improvement, and extensive pavement repairs.

== See also ==
- Rapidan Passenger Depot
